= Central Congregational Church =

Central Congregational Church may refer to:

- Central Congregational Church (Dallas)
- Central Congregational Church (Eastport, Maine)
- Central Congregational Church (Fall River, Massachusetts)
- Central Congregational Church (Galesburg, Illinois)
- Central Congregational Church (Newton, Massachusetts)
- Central Congregational Church (Providence, Rhode Island)
