= National Register of Historic Places listings in Dallas County, Texas =

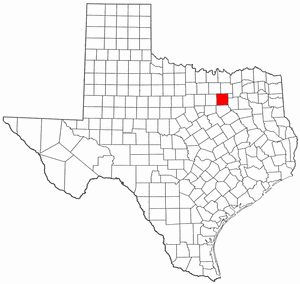
Location of Dallas County in Texas

This is a list of the National Register of Historic Places listings in Dallas County, Texas.

This is intended to be a complete list of properties and districts listed on the National Register of Historic Places in Dallas County, Texas. There are 35 districts, 117 individual properties, and three former properties listed on the National Register in the county. Two districts and one individually listed property are also National Historic Landmarks. Four individually listed properties are State Antiquities Landmarks with five districts containing several more. Twenty-two individual properties are Recorded Texas Historic Landmarks while seven districts host multiple additional RTHLs.

This National Park Service list is complete through NPS recent listings posted September 25, 2026.

== Current listings ==
The locations of National Register properties and districts may be seen in a mapping service provided.

	Name on the Register	Image	Date listed	Location	City or town	Description
1	511 Akard Building	511 Akard Building	March 31, 2014 (#14000103)	511 N. Akard; 32°47′03″N 96°48′02″W	Dallas	
2	1926 Republic National Bank	1926 Republic National Bank	January 18, 2006 (#05001543)	1309 Main St. 32°46′56″N 96°48′03″W	Dallas	Part of Dallas Downtown Historic District
3	4928 Bryan Street Apartments	4928 Bryan Street Apartments	March 23, 1995 (#08000539)	4928 Bryan Street; 32°48′16″N 96°46′20″W	Dallas	Historic Resources of East and South Dallas MPS
4	W.H. Adamson High School	W.H. Adamson High School	June 8, 2011 (#11000343)	201 E. 9th St. 32°44′52″N 96°49′19″W	Dallas	
5	Alcalde Street-Crockett School Historic District	Alcalde Street-Crockett School Historic District	March 23, 1995 (#95000330)	200-500 Alcalde, 421-421A N. Carroll and 4315 Victor; 32°47′33″N 96°46′12″W	Dallas	Historic Resources of East and South Dallas MPS
6	Ambassador Hotel	Ambassador Hotel	April 4, 2019 (#100003599)	1300 S. Ervay; 32°46′22″N 96°47′26″W	Dallas	Destroyed by fire May 28, 2019.
7	D. M. Angle House	D. M. Angle House	March 27, 1985 (#85000710)	800 Beltline; 32°35′22″N 96°57′30″W	Cedar Hill	Historic Resources of Cedar Hill MRA
8	Bella Villa Apartments	Bella Villa Apartments	September 12, 2019 (#100004371)	5506 Miller Ave; 32°49′16″N 96°46′28″W	Dallas	
9	Alfred Horatio Belo House	Alfred Horatio Belo House	October 29, 1975 (#75001965)	2115 Ross Ave. 32°47′18″N 96°47′55″W	Dallas	Recorded Texas Historic Landmark
10	Didaco and Ida Bianchi House	Didaco and Ida Bianchi House	March 23, 1995 (#95000311)	4503 Reiger Ave. 32°47′35″N 96°46′07″W	Dallas	Historic Resources of East and South Dallas MPS
11	Bluitt Sanitarium	Bluitt Sanitarium	July 26, 2006 (#06000651)	2036 Commerce St. 32°46′58″N 96°47′33″W	Dallas	Part of Dallas Downtown Historic District
12	Boedeker Ice Cream Company	Boedeker Ice Cream Company	September 4, 2025 (#100012196)	1201 South Ervay Street; 32°46′24″N 96°47′31″W	Dallas	
13	Braniff International Hostess College	Braniff International Hostess College	March 2, 2021 (#100006219)	2801 Wycliff Ave. 32°48′44″N 96°49′01″W	Dallas	
14	Alfred and Juantia Bromberg House	Alfred and Juantia Bromberg House	July 8, 2008 (#08000658)	3201 Wendover Road; 32°49′29″N 96°44′35″W	Dallas	
15	Bryan Tower	Bryan Tower	August 14, 2024 (#100009495)	2001 Bryan St. 32°47′07″N 96°47′47″W	Dallas	
16	Bryan-Peak Commercial Historic District	Bryan-Peak Commercial Historic District	March 23, 1995 (#95000327)	4214-4311 Bryan Ave. and 1325-1408 N. Peak; 32°47′51″N 96°46′45″W	Dallas	Historic Resources of East and South Dallas MPS
17	William Bryant Jr. House	William Bryant Jr. House	March 27, 1985 (#85000711)	S. Broad and Cooper; 32°35′09″N 96°57′25″W	Cedar Hill	Historic Resources of Cedar Hill MRA
18	Building at 3525 Turtle Creek Boulevard	Building at 3525 Turtle Creek Boulevard	May 29, 2008 (#08000475)	3525 Turtle Creek Boulevard; 32°48′40″N 96°48′11″W	Dallas	
19	Busch-Kirby Building	Busch-Kirby Building	July 4, 1980 (#80004489)	1501-1509 Main St. 32°46′49″N 96°47′56″W	Dallas	Recorded Texas Historic Landmark; part of Dallas Downtown Historic District; originally listed as Busch Building before boundary increase of September 12, 1996.
20	Cabana Motor Hotel	Cabana Motor Hotel	May 8, 2019 (#100003923)	899 N. Stemmons Frwy. 32°47′10″N 96°48′48″W	Dallas	
21	Cedar Springs Place	Cedar Springs Place	December 30, 1991 (#91001901)	2531 Lucas Dr. 32°48′50″N 96°49′14″W	Dallas	
22	Central Congregational Church	Central Congregational Church	March 23, 1995 (#95000307)	1530 N. Carroll; 32°48′07″N 96°46′43″W	Dallas	Historic Resources of East and South Dallas MPS
23	Chevrolet Motor Company Building	Chevrolet Motor Company Building	April 18, 2003 (#03000277)	3221 Commerce; 32°47′04″N 96°46′36″W	Dallas	
24	Claremont Apartments	Claremont Apartments	March 23, 1995 (#95000313)	4636 Ross Ave. 32°48′17″N 96°46′37″W	Dallas	Historic Resources of East and South Dallas MPS; demolished
25	Clements Hall	Clements Hall	September 27, 1980 (#80004087)	3200 Dyer St. 32°50′36″N 96°47′03″W	University Park	Georgian Revival Buildings of Southern Methodist University TR
26	Colonial Hill Historic District	Colonial Hill Historic District	March 23, 1995 (#95000334)	Bounded by Pennsylvania Ave., I-45, US 75 and Hatcher; 32°45′04″N 96°45′58″W	Dallas	Historic Resources of East and South Dallas MPS
27	Continental Gin Company	Continental Gin Company	February 14, 1983 (#83003134)	3301-3333 Elm St., 212 and 232 Trunk Ave. 32°47′10″N 96°46′37″W	Dallas	
28	Dallas Coffin Company	Dallas Coffin Company	June 15, 2012 (#12000350)	1325 S. Lamar; 32°46′04″N 96°47′46″W	Dallas	
29	Dallas County Courthouse	Dallas County Courthouse	December 12, 1976 (#76002019)	Houston and Commerce Sts. 32°46′45″N 96°48′25″W	Dallas	State Antiquities Landmark, Recorded Texas Historic Landmark; part of Dealey Plaza Historic District, Westend Historic District
30	Dallas Downtown Historic District	Dallas Downtown Historic District	August 11, 2006 (#04000894)	Roughly bounded by Federal, N. St. Paul, Pacific, Harwood, S. Pearl, Commerce, S, Ervay, Akard, Commerce, and Field; also bounded by Jackson, North Hardwood Commerce, the north-south line between S. Pearl Expressway, and S. Hardwood Canton; also 400 N. St. Paul St. 32°46′57″N 96°47′51″W	Dallas	Includes State Antiquities Landmark, Recorded Texas Historic Landmarks; boundary increases were approved January 9, 2009 and June 29, 2026.
31	Dallas Fire Station No. 16	Dallas Fire Station No. 16	April 17, 1997 (#97000363)	5501 Columbia Ave. 32°47′56″N 96°45′18″W	Dallas	
32	Dallas Hall	Dallas Hall	November 17, 1978 (#78002913)	Southern Methodist University campus 32°50′42″N 96°47′05″W	University Park	Recorded Texas Historic Landmark; Georgian Revival Buildings of Southern Methodist University TR
33	Dallas High School Historic District	Dallas High School Historic District	February 20, 1996 (#96000035)	2218 Bryan St. 32°47′10″N 96°47′36″W	Dallas	
34	Dallas National Bank	Dallas National Bank	May 10, 2005 (#05000419)	1530 Main and 1511 Commerce St. 32°46′56″N 96°47′54″W	Dallas	Part of Dallas Downtown Historic District
35	Dallas Scottish Rite Temple	Dallas Scottish Rite Temple	March 26, 1980 (#80004088)	Harwood and Young Sts. 32°46′43″N 96°47′31″W	Dallas	Recorded Texas Historic Landmark; part of Dallas Downtown Historic District
36	Dallas Tent and Awning Building	Dallas Tent and Awning Building	October 28, 1999 (#99001292)	3401 Commerce St. 32°47′06″N 96°46′28″W	Dallas	
37	Dallas Times Herald Pasadena Perfect Home	Dallas Times Herald Pasadena Perfect Home	September 13, 2006 (#06000819)	6938 Wildgrove Ave. 32°49′08″N 96°44′15″W	Dallas	
38	Dallas Union Terminal	Dallas Union Terminal	May 29, 1975 (#75001966)	400 S. Houston St. 32°46′32″N 96°48′27″W	Dallas	Recorded Texas Historic Landmark
39	Dealey Plaza Historic District	Dealey Plaza Historic District	April 19, 1993 (#93001607)	Roughly bounded by Pacific Ave., Market St., Jackson St. and right of way of Dallas Right of Way Management Company; 32°46′42″N 96°48′26″W	Dallas	Includes State Antiquities Landmark, Recorded Texas Historic Landmarks
40	DeGolyer Estate	DeGolyer Estate	December 28, 1978 (#78002914)	8525 Garland Rd. 32°49′17″N 96°43′03″W	Dallas	State Antiquities Landmark, Recorded Texas Historic Landmark
41	Deep Ellum Historic District	Deep Ellum Historic District	June 30, 2023 (#100009082)	Roughly bounded by Dallas Area Rapid Transit (DART) alignment and Elm St., South Hall St., North Central Expy., and E.R.L. Thornton Fwy. (I 30); 32°47′01″N 96°46′55″W	Dallas	
42	Dixon-Moore House		March 23, 1995 (#95000320)	2716 Peabody; 32°48′07″N 96°46′43″W	Dallas	Historic Resources of East and South Dallas MPS; demolished
43	James H. and Molly Ellis House	James H. and Molly Ellis House	March 23, 1995 (#95000323)	2426 Pine, until destruction by fire in 2019; 32°45′17″N 96°45′42″W	Dallas	Historic Resources of East and South Dallas MPS; demolished
44	Emanuel Lutheran Church	Emanuel Lutheran Church	March 23, 1995 (#95000315)	4301 San Jacinto; 32°48′02″N 96°46′51″W	Dallas	Historic Resources of East and South Dallas MPS
45	James W. Fannin Elementary School	James W. Fannin Elementary School	March 23, 1995 (#95000314)	4800 Ross Ave. 32°48′19″N 96°46′32″W	Dallas	Historic Resources of East and South Dallas MPS
46	Fidelity Union Life Insurance Building	Fidelity Union Life Insurance Building	September 29, 2009 (#09000306)	1511 Bryan and 1507 Pacific Ave. 32°46′57″N 96°47′59″W	Dallas	
47	First Methodist Episcopal Church, South		October 1, 2026 (#100013503)	1928 Ross Avenue; 32°47′11″N 96°47′58″W	Dallas	
48	First National Bank Tower	First National Bank Tower	October 23, 2017 (#100001764)	1401 Elm St. 32°46′54″N 96°48′02″W	Dallas	
49	Fred Florence Hall	Fred Florence Hall	September 27, 1980 (#80004089)	3330 University Blvd. 32°50′43″N 96°47′10″W	University Park	Georgian Revival Buildings of Southern Methodist University TR
50	Forest Theatre	Forest Theatre	December 4, 2019 (#100004752)	1904 Martin Luther King Jr. Blvd. 32°45′50″N 96°46′28″W	Dallas	
51	Old Forest Avenue High School	Old Forest Avenue High School	March 23, 1995 (#95000318)	3000 Martin Luther King, Jr., Blvd. 32°46′16″N 96°45′53″W	Dallas	Historic Resources of East and South Dallas MPS
52	G & J Manufacturing	G & J Manufacturing	September 14, 2002 (#02000992)	3912 Willow St. 32°47′08″N 96°46′13″W	Dallas	
53	Garland Bank & Trust Company	Garland Bank & Trust Company	January 20, 2023 (#100008552)	111 South Garland Ave. 32°54′43″N 96°38′55″W	Garland	
54	Garland Downtown Historic District	Garland Downtown Historic District	April 10, 2017 (#100000861)	Roughly bounded by W. State St., Santa Fe rail line, W. Ave. A & Glenbrook Dr. 32°54′46″N 96°38′20″W	Garland	A boundary increase was approved July 24, 2017.
55	Samuel and Julia Gilbert House	Samuel and Julia Gilbert House	November 10, 1988 (#88002063)	2540 Farmers Branch Ln. 32°55′05″N 96°53′26″W	Farmers Branch	Recorded Texas Historic Landmark
56	Goodyear Tire and Rubber Company Building and B.F. Goodrich Building	Goodyear Tire and Rubber Company Building and B.F. Goodrich Building	February 19, 2002 (#02000009)	2809 Parry Ave. and 4136-40 Commerce St. 32°46′29″N 96°45′56″W	Dallas	
57	Gospel Lighthouse Church	Gospel Lighthouse Church	February 9, 2022 (#100007423)	1900 South Ewing Ave. 32°43′29″N 96°48′39″W	Dallas	
58	Grace Methodist Episcopal Church	Grace Methodist Episcopal Church	November 4, 1982 (#82001736)	4105 Junius St. 32°47′36″N 96°46′32″W	Dallas	Part of Peak's Suburban Addition Historic District
59	Grand Lodge of the Colored Knights of Pythias, Texas	Grand Lodge of the Colored Knights of Pythias, Texas	February 17, 2017 (#100000671)	2551 Elm St. 32°47′03″N 96°47′14″W	Dallas	
60	Greenway Parks Historic District	Greenway Parks Historic District	January 10, 2008 (#07001383)	Bounded by W. Mockingbird Ln., W. University Blvd., Inwood & N. Dallas Tollway. 32°50′27″N 96°49′04″W	Dallas	Historic Residential Suburbs in the United States, 1830-1960 MPS
61	George C. Greer House	George C. Greer House	January 9, 1997 (#96001563)	5439 Swiss Ave. 32°48′23″N 96°45′53″W	Dallas	Part of Swiss Avenue Historic District
62	Gulf Oil Distribution Facility	Gulf Oil Distribution Facility	March 31, 2010 (#10000144)	501 S. 2nd St. 32°46′56″N 96°46′22″W	Dallas	
63	Harlan Building	Harlan Building	February 26, 2004 (#04000102)	2018 Cadiz St. 32°46′49″N 96°47′28″W	Dallas	
64	Z. T. (Tip) Hawkes House	Z. T. (Tip) Hawkes House	March 27, 1985 (#85000712)	132 N. Potter St. 32°35′28″N 96°57′33″W	Cedar Hill	Historic Resources of Cedar Hill MRA
65	Highland Park Shopping Village	Highland Park Shopping Village	November 17, 1997 (#97001393)	Jct. of Preston Rd. and Mockingbird Ln. 32°50′08″N 96°48′18″W	Highland Park	
66	Hilton Hotel	Hilton Hotel	December 5, 1985 (#85003092)	1933 Main St. 32°46′54″N 96°47′39″W	Dallas	Recorded Texas Historic Landmark; part of Dallas Downtown Historic District
67	Hotel Adolphus	Hotel Adolphus	July 14, 1983 (#83003133)	1315 Commerce St. 32°46′47″N 96°47′57″W	Dallas	Recorded Texas Historic Landmark; part of Dallas Downtown Historic District
68	Houston Street Viaduct	Houston Street Viaduct	August 9, 1984 (#84001641)	Houston St. roughly between Arlington St. and Lancaster Ave. 32°46′12″N 96°48′31″W	Dallas	
69	Hughes Brothers Manufacturing Company Building	Hughes Brothers Manufacturing Company Building	December 27, 2016 (#16000915)	1401 S. Ervay St. 32°46′20″N 96°47′25″W	Dallas	
70	Hyer Hall	Hyer Hall	September 27, 1980 (#80004090)	6424 Hill Lane; 32°50′41″N 96°47′02″W	University Park	Georgian Revival Buildings of Southern Methodist University TR
71	Interstate Forwarding Company Warehouse	Interstate Forwarding Company Warehouse	February 14, 1992 (#92000021)	3200 Main St. 32°47′05″N 96°46′37″W	Dallas	Recorded Texas Historic Landmark
72	Joffre-Gilbert House	Joffre-Gilbert House	August 1, 2014 (#14000473)	309 South O'Connor Road; 32°48′41″N 96°57′01″W	Irving	Recorded Texas Historic Landmark
73	Johnson Rooming House	Johnson Rooming House	November 26, 2014 (#14000962)	1026 N. Beckley Avenue; 32°45′32″N 96°49′21″W	Dallas	
74	Kessler Park Historic District	Kessler Park Historic District	June 17, 1994 (#94000607)	Roughly bounded by Kidd Springs, Stewart, Oak Cliff, Plymouth, I-30, Turner, Colorado, and Sylvan; 32°45′25″N 96°50′39″W	Dallas	Historic and Architectural Resources of Oak Cliff MPS; a boundary increase was approved September 7, 1995.
75	King's Highway Historic District	King's Highway Historic District	June 17, 1994 (#94000606)	900-1500 Blocks of King's Highway between W. Davis St. and Montclair Ave. 32°45′07″N 96°50′32″W	Dallas	Historic and Architectural Resources of Oak Cliff MPS
76	Lake Cliff Historic District	Lake Cliff Historic District	June 17, 1994 (#94000609)	Roughly bounded by E. 6th St., Beckley Ave., Zangs Blvd. and Marsalis Ave. 32°45′23″N 96°49′06″W	Dallas	Historic and Architectural Resources of Oak Cliff MPS
77	Lamar-McKinney Bridge	Lamar-McKinney Bridge	October 5, 2015 (#15000708)	Across Trinity River at Continental Avenue; 32°46′52″N 96°49′20″W	Dallas	
78	Lancaster Avenue Commercial Historic District	Lancaster Avenue Commercial Historic District	June 17, 1994 (#94000605)	Roughly bounded by E. Jefferson Blvd., S. Marsalis, E. 10th St., E. 9th St. and N. Lancaster Ave. 32°44′54″N 96°48′53″W	Dallas	Historic and Architectural Resources of Oak Cliff MPS
79	Stephen Decatur Lawrence Farmstead	Stephen Decatur Lawrence Farmstead	September 9, 1999 (#99001139)	701 E. Kearney St. 32°46′13″N 96°35′20″W	Mesquite	Recorded Texas Historic Landmark
80	Mark and Maybelle Lemmon House	Mark and Maybelle Lemmon House	June 15, 2006 (#06000513)	3211 Mockingbird Ln. 32°50′17″N 96°47′04″W	Highland Park	Recorded Texas Historic Landmark
81	Levi-Moses House	Levi-Moses House	March 23, 1995 (#95000316)	2433 Martin Luther King, Jr., Blvd. 32°45′56″N 96°46′20″W	Dallas	Historic Resources of East and South Dallas MPS
82	Levi-Topletz House	Levi-Topletz House	March 23, 1995 (#95000317)	2603 Martin Luther King, Jr., Blvd. 32°46′02″N 96°46′13″W	Dallas	Historic Resources of East and South Dallas MPS
83	Lincoln Paint and Color Company Building	Lincoln Paint and Color Company Building	July 11, 2002 (#02000730)	3210 Main; 32°47′06″N 96°46′36″W	Dallas	
84	Longhorn Ballroom	Longhorn Ballroom	February 1, 2024 (#100009894)	200 Corinth Street; 32°45′37″N 96°47′36″W	Dallas	
85	Magnolia Building	Magnolia Building	January 30, 1978 (#78002915)	108 S. Akard St. 32°46′48″N 96°47′56″W	Dallas	Recorded Texas Historic Landmark; part of Dallas Downtown Historic District
86	Magnolia Petroleum Company City Sales and Warehouse	Magnolia Petroleum Company City Sales and Warehouse	December 23, 1994 (#94001473)	1607 Lyte St. 32°47′33″N 96°48′37″W	Dallas	
87	Majestic Theatre	Majestic Theatre	November 14, 1977 (#77001437)	1925 Elm St. 32°47′01″N 96°47′40″W	Dallas	State Antiquities Landmark, Recorded Texas Historic Landmark; part of Dallas Downtown Historic District
88	Mary Apartments	Mary Apartments	March 23, 1995 (#95000310)	4524 Live Oak; 32°47′58″N 96°46′30″W	Dallas	Historic Resources of East and South Dallas MPS-Demolished
89	Mayflower Building	Mayflower Building	January 27, 2015 (#14001227)	411 North Akard Street; 32°46′59″N 96°48′03″W	Dallas	
90	McFarlin Memorial Auditorium	McFarlin Memorial Auditorium	September 27, 1980 (#80004091)	6405 Hillcrest Rd. 32°50′38″N 96°47′10″W	University Park	Georgian Revival Buildings of Southern Methodist University TR
91	McGaugh Hosiery Mills - Airmaid Mills Building	McGaugh Hosiery Mills - Airmaid Mills Building	August 8, 2019 (#100004249)	4408 2nd Ave. 32°45′52″N 96°44′52″W	Dallas	
92	Roger D. McIntosh House	Roger D. McIntosh House	April 7, 1983 (#83003135)	1518 Abrams Rd. 32°48′25″N 96°45′13″W	Dallas	
93	Medical Dental Building	Medical Dental Building	December 13, 2000 (#00001537)	300 Blk. of West Jefferson Blvd. 32°44′36″N 96°49′37″W	Dallas	Historic and Architectural Resources of Oak Cliff MPS
94	Miller and Stemmons Historic District	Miller and Stemmons Historic District	June 17, 1994 (#94000611)	Roughly bounded by W. Davis St., Woodlawn Ave., Neches and Elsbeth; 32°45′09″N 96°49′39″W	Dallas	Historic and Architectural Resources of Oak Cliff MPS
95	John Hickman Miller House	John Hickman Miller House	May 23, 1980 (#80004092)	3506 Cedar Springs; 32°48′24″N 96°48′20″W	Dallas	Recorded Texas Historic Landmark
96	John E. Mitchell Company Plant	John E. Mitchell Company Plant	March 4, 1991 (#91000118)	3800 Commerce St. 32°47′05″N 96°46′16″W	Dallas	
97	Monroe Shops	Monroe Shops	March 7, 2007 (#07000130)	2111 S. Corinth St. 32°43′27″N 96°48′15″W	Dallas	
98	Mrs. Baird's Bread Company Building	Mrs. Baird's Bread Company Building	March 23, 1995 (#95000309)	1401 N. Carroll; 32°48′01″N 96°46′36″W	Dallas	Historic Resources of East and South Dallas MPS
99	Munger Place Historic District	Munger Place Historic District	September 13, 1978 (#78002916)	Roughly bounded by Henderson, Junius, Prairie, and Reiger Sts. 32°47′58″N 96°45′51″W	Dallas	
100	North Bishop Avenue Commercial Historic District	North Bishop Avenue Commercial Historic District	June 17, 1994 (#94000608)	Roughly bounded by 9th St., Davis St., Adams and Madison; 32°44′50″N 96°49′42″W	Dallas	Historic and Architectural Resources of Oak Cliff MPS
101	Number 4 Hook and Ladder Company	Number 4 Hook and Ladder Company	May 4, 1981 (#81000627)	Cedar Springs Rd. and Reagan St. 32°48′35″N 96°48′32″W	Dallas	
102	Oak Lawn Methodist Episcopal Church, South	Oak Lawn Methodist Episcopal Church, South	March 16, 1988 (#88000176)	3014 Oak Lawn Ave. 32°48′33″N 96°48′29″W	Dallas	
103	One Main Place	One Main Place	May 15, 2015 (#15000245)	1201 Main Street; 32°46′50″N 96°48′07″W	Dallas	
104	Paine House	Paine House	November 26, 2014 (#14000963)	2515 West 5th Street; 32°48′35″N 96°58′46″W	Irving	Location where Lee Harvey Oswald stayed the night before the assassination of President John F. Kennedy.
105	Parkland Hospital	Parkland Hospital	October 25, 2011 (#10000249)	3819 Maple Avenue; 32°48′15″N 96°48′56″W	Dallas	Original Parkland Hospital building
106	Stanley Patterson Hall	Stanley Patterson Hall	September 27, 1980 (#80004094)	3128 Dyer St. 32°50′36″N 96°46′56″W	University Park	Georgian Revival Buildings of Southern Methodist University TR
107	Peak's Suburban Addition Historic District	Peak's Suburban Addition Historic District	March 23, 1995 (#95000328)	Roughly bounded by Sycamore, Peak, Worth and Fitzhugh; 32°47′44″N 96°46′24″W	Dallas	Historic Resources of East and South Dallas MPS
108	Perkins Hall of Administration	Perkins Hall of Administration	September 27, 1980 (#80004095)	6425 Hillcrest Rd. 32°50′41″N 96°47′09″W	University Park	Georgian Revival Buildings of Southern Methodist University TR
109	Purvin-Hexter Building	Purvin-Hexter Building	January 18, 2006 (#05001541)	2038 Commerce St. 32°46′58″N 96°47′35″W	Dallas	Part of Dallas Downtown Historic District
110	Queen City Heights Historic District	Queen City Heights Historic District	March 23, 1995 (#95000332)	Roughly bounded by Eugene, Cooper, Latimer, Kynard and Dildock; 32°45′36″N 96°45′47″W	Dallas	Historic Resources of East and South Dallas MPS
111	Randlett House	Randlett House	August 11, 1978 (#78002920)	401 S. Centre St. 32°35′26″N 96°45′20″W	Lancaster	
112	Capt. R. A. Rawlins House	Capt. R. A. Rawlins House	November 15, 1978 (#78002921)	2219 Dowling St. 32°34′49″N 96°45′22″W	Lancaster	Recorded Texas Historic Landmark
113	Republic National Bank	Republic National Bank	March 31, 2005 (#05000243)	300 N. Ervay/325 N. St. Paul St. 32°47′06″N 96°47′51″W	Dallas	Part of Dallas Downtown Historic District
114	Dr. Rufus A. Roberts House	Dr. Rufus A. Roberts House	March 27, 1985 (#85000713)	210 S. Broad St. 32°35′17″N 96°57′26″W	Cedar Hill	Recorded Texas Historic Landmark; Historic Resources of Cedar Hill MRA
115	Romine Avenue Historic District	Romine Avenue Historic District	March 23, 1995 (#95000333)	2300-2400 blocks of Romine Ave., N side 32°45′32″N 96°45′54″W	Dallas	Historic Resources of East and South Dallas MPS
116	Rosemont Crest Historic District	Rosemont Crest Historic District	June 17, 1994 (#94000610)	Roughly bounded by 10th St., Oak Cliff Blvd., W. Davis St., N. Brighton Ave., W. 8th St. and Rosemont Ave. 32°44′48″N 96°51′02″W	Dallas	Historic and Architectural Resources of Oak Cliff MPS
117	Max J. and Jennie Rosenfield House	Max J. and Jennie Rosenfield House	April 21, 2025 (#100011754)	1419 Beaumont Street; 32°46′08″N 96°47′21″W	Dallas	
118	Rush-Crabb House	Rush-Crabb House	March 23, 1995 (#95000321)	2718 Pennsylvania; 32°46′02″N 96°46′02″W	Dallas	Historic Resources of East and South Dallas MPS
119	Sanger Brothers Complex	Sanger Brothers Complex	April 8, 1975 (#75001967)	Block 32, bounded by Elm, Lamar, Main and Austin Sts. 32°46′47″N 96°48′15″W	Dallas	Part of Westend Historic District
120	Santa Fe Terminal Buildings No. 1 and No. 2	Santa Fe Terminal Buildings No. 1 and No. 2	May 23, 1997 (#97000478)	1114 Commerce St. and 1118 Jackson St. 32°47′48″N 96°48′03″W	Dallas	
121	Santa Fe Terminal Building No. 4	Santa Fe Terminal Building No. 4	June 8, 2011 (#11000344)	1033 Young St. 32°46′37″N 96°48′04″W	Dallas	
122	Everard Sharrock Jr. Farm	Everard Sharrock Jr. Farm	December 8, 2015 (#15000877)	6900 Grady Niblo Rd. 32°41′02″N 96°56′23″W	Dallas	Recorded Texas Historic Landmark
123	Thomas Shiels House	Thomas Shiels House	March 23, 1995 (#95000312)	4602 Reiger Ave. 32°47′37″N 96°46′02″W	Dallas	Historic Resources of East and South Dallas MPS
124	Ascher Silberstein School	Ascher Silberstein School	March 23, 1995 (#95000325)	2425 Pine St. 32°45′21″N 96°45′40″W	Dallas	Historic Resources of East and South Dallas MPS
125	Snider Hall	Snider Hall	September 27, 1980 (#80004096)	3305 Dyer St. 32°50′33″N 96°47′09″W	University Park	Georgian Revival Buildings of Southern Methodist University TR
126	South Boulevard–Park Row Historic District	South Boulevard–Park Row Historic District	February 5, 1979 (#79002930)	South Blvd. and Park Row from Central; 32°46′05″N 96°46′20″W	Dallas	
127	Jacob and Eliza Spake House	Jacob and Eliza Spake House	November 21, 1985 (#85002912)	2600 State St. 32°47′43″N 96°47′58″W	Dallas	
128	St. Paul Methodist Episcopal Church	St. Paul Methodist Episcopal Church	December 27, 2016 (#16000916)	1816 Routh St. 32°47′32″N 96°47′47″W	Dallas	Recorded Texas Historic Landmark
129	Stanard-Tilton Flour Mill	Stanard-Tilton Flour Mill	October 6, 1997 (#97001187)	2400 S. Ervay St. 32°46′00″N 96°46′55″W	Dallas	
130	Stoneleigh Court Hotel	Stoneleigh Court Hotel	September 18, 2007 (#07000989)	2927 Maple Ave. 32°47′51″N 96°48′25″W	Dallas	
131	Strain Farm-W.A. Strain House	Strain Farm-W.A. Strain House	November 29, 1978 (#78002922)	400 E. Pecan St., 400 Lancaster-Hutchins Rd. 32°35′16″N 96°44′58″W	Lancaster	Includes State Antiquities Landmarks, Recorded Texas Historic Landmark; a boundary increase was approved September 17, 2001.
132	Straus House	Straus House	July 12, 1985 (#85001495)	400 Cedar; 32°35′18″N 96°57′15″W	Cedar Hill	Historic Resources of Cedar Hill MRA
133	Swiss Avenue Historic District	Swiss Avenue Historic District	March 28, 1974 (#74002068)	Swiss Ave. between Fitzhugh and LaVista; 32°48′25″N 96°45′49″W	Dallas	Includes Recorded Texas Historic Landmarks
134	Tenth Street Historic District	Tenth Street Historic District	June 17, 1994 (#94000604)	Roughly bounded by E. Clarendon Dr., S. Fleming Ave., I-35E, E. 8th St. and the E end of Church, E. 9th and Plum Sts. 32°44′52″N 96°48′23″W	Dallas	Historic and Architectural Resources of Oak Cliff MPS
135	Texas Centennial Exposition Buildings (1936-1937)	Texas Centennial Exposition Buildings (1936-1937)	September 24, 1986 (#86003488)	Bounded by Texas and Pacific RR, Pennsylvania, Second, and Parry Aves. 32°46′46″N 96°45′35″W	Dallas	Includes State Antiquities Landmarks, Recorded Texas Historic Landmarks
136	Texas Farm and Ranch Building	Texas Farm and Ranch Building	December 9, 1999 (#99001499)	3300 Main St. 32°47′07″N 96°46′31″W	Dallas	
137	Texas Theatre	Texas Theatre	April 1, 2003 (#03000187)	231 W. Jefferson Blvd. 32°44′36″N 96°49′32″W	Dallas	Historic and Architectural Resources of Oak Cliff MPS
138	Titche-Goettinger Building	Titche-Goettinger Building	May 24, 1996 (#96000586)	1901 Main St. 32°47′26″N 96°47′42″W	Dallas	Part of Dallas Downtown Historic District
139	Travis College Hill Historic District	Travis College Hill Historic District	February 17, 2017 (#100000672)	300-400 blocks S. 11th St. 32°54′36″N 96°38′36″W	Garland	
140	Trinity English Lutheran Church	Trinity English Lutheran Church	March 23, 1995 (#95000319)	3100 Martin Luther King, Jr., Blvd. 32°46′19″N 96°45′52″W	Dallas	Historic Resources of East and South Dallas MPS
141	Turtle Creek Pump Station	Turtle Creek Pump Station	February 9, 2001 (#01000103)	3630 Harry Hines Blvd. 32°48′00″N 96°48′59″W	Dallas	State Antiquities Landmark, Recorded Texas Historic Landmark
142	U.S. Courthouse and Federal Office Building	U.S. Courthouse and Federal Office Building	November 14, 2023 (#100009557)	1100 Commerce Street; 32°48′04″N 96°46′15″W	Dallas	The Earle Cabell Federal Building and Courthouse.
143	Viola Courts Apartments	Viola Courts Apartments	January 19, 1984 (#84001643)	4845 Swiss Ave. 32°48′04″N 96°46′15″W	Dallas	Part of Peak's Suburban Addition Historic District
144	Virginia Hall	Virginia Hall	September 27, 1980 (#80004097)	3325 Dyer St. 32°50′34″N 96°47′11″W	University Park	Georgian Revival Buildings of Southern Methodist University TR
145	Waples-Platter Buildings	Waples-Platter Buildings	March 24, 1978 (#78002917)	2200-2211 N. Lamar St. 32°47′04″N 96°48′30″W	Dallas	
146	Wedgwood Apartments	Wedgwood Apartments	May 25, 2021 (#100006549)	2511 Wedglea Dr. 32°45′29″N 96°51′37″W	Dallas	
147	Westend Historic District	Westend Historic District	November 14, 1978 (#78002918)	Bounded by Lamar, Griffin, Wood, Market, and Commerce Sts. 32°46′44″N 96°48′21″W	Dallas	Includes State Antiquities Landmark, Recorded Texas Historic Landmarks
148	Wheatley Place Historic District	Wheatley Place Historic District	March 23, 1995 (#95000331)	Bounded by Warren, Atlanta, McDermott, Meadow, Oakland and Dathe; 32°45′54″N 96°45′43″W	Dallas	includes Recorded Texas Historic Landmark; Historic Resources of East and South Dallas MPS
149	White Rock Bluffs		June 25, 2026 (#100013163)	The collection of municipal parkland around 2324 N Jim Miller Road. roughly bounded on the north by State Highway 352 and Seco Blvd to the south. 32°45′13″N 96°42′09″W	Dallas	
150	Wilson Block	Wilson Block	December 15, 1978 (#78002919)	2902, 2906, 2910 and 2922 Swiss Ave. 32°47′18″N 96°47′05″W	Dallas	
151	Wilson Building	Wilson Building	July 24, 1979 (#79002931)	1621-1623 Main St. 32°46′53″N 96°47′49″W	Dallas	Part of Dallas Downtown Historic District
152	Winnetka Heights Historic District	Winnetka Heights Historic District	November 3, 1983 (#83003758)	Roughly bounded by Davis and 12th Sts., and Rosemont and Willomet Aves. 32°44′39″N 96°50′41″W	Dallas	

== Former listings ==
	Name on the Register	Image	Date listed	Date removed	Location	City or town	Description
1	Jordan C. Ownby Stadium		September 27, 1980 (#80004093)	September 23, 2004	5900 Ownby Drive; 32°50′22″N 96°46′56″W	University Park	Georgian Revival Buildings of Southern Methodist University TR; Demolished in 1998.
2	Seagoville School		August 10, 2005 (#05000857)	January 4, 2012	306 N. Kaufman St. 32°38′26″N 96°32′25″W	Seagoville	Demolished May 3, 2011.
3	Trinity Methodist Episcopal Church		April 24, 1975 (#75001968)	October 19, 1983	2120 McKinney Ave. 32°47′33″N 96°48′10″W	Dallas	Destroyed by fire in 1981.

== See also ==
- National Register of Historic Places listings in Texas
- Recorded Texas Historic Landmarks in Dallas County
