= Clements Hall =

- U.S. National Register of Historic Places
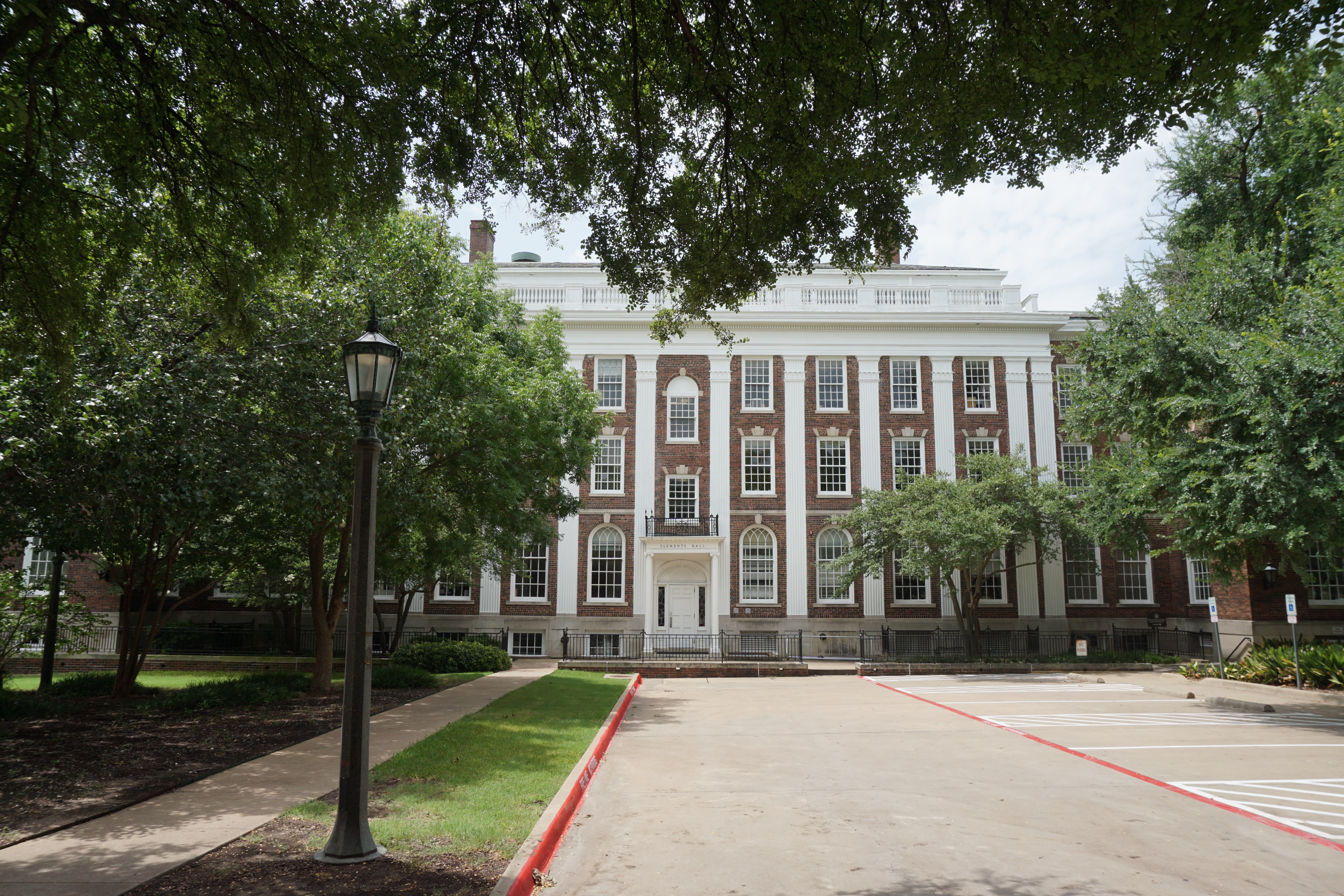
- Clements Hall in 2016

- Location within Texas Location within the United States
- Location: 3100 Dyer St., University Park, Texas
- Coordinates: 32°50′36″N 96°47′3″W
- Area: less than one acre
- Built: 1915
- Architect: Shepley, Rutan & Coolidge
- Architectural style: Colonial Revival, Georgian Revival
- MPS: Georgian Revival Buildings of Southern Methodist University TR (AD)
- NRHP reference No.: 80004087
- Added to NRHP: September 27, 1980

Clements Hall, formerly known as Atkins Hall, is a historic building on the campus of Southern Methodist University in University Park, Texas, U.S.. It was built in 1915, and designed by Shepley, Rutan and Coolidge in the Georgian Revival architectural style. It has been listed on the National Register of Historic Places since September 27, 1980.

It is a four-story building.

== See also ==
- National Register of Historic Places listings in Dallas County, Texas
