= James H. and Molly Ellis House =

Historic house in Texas, United States

- U.S. National Register of Historic Places
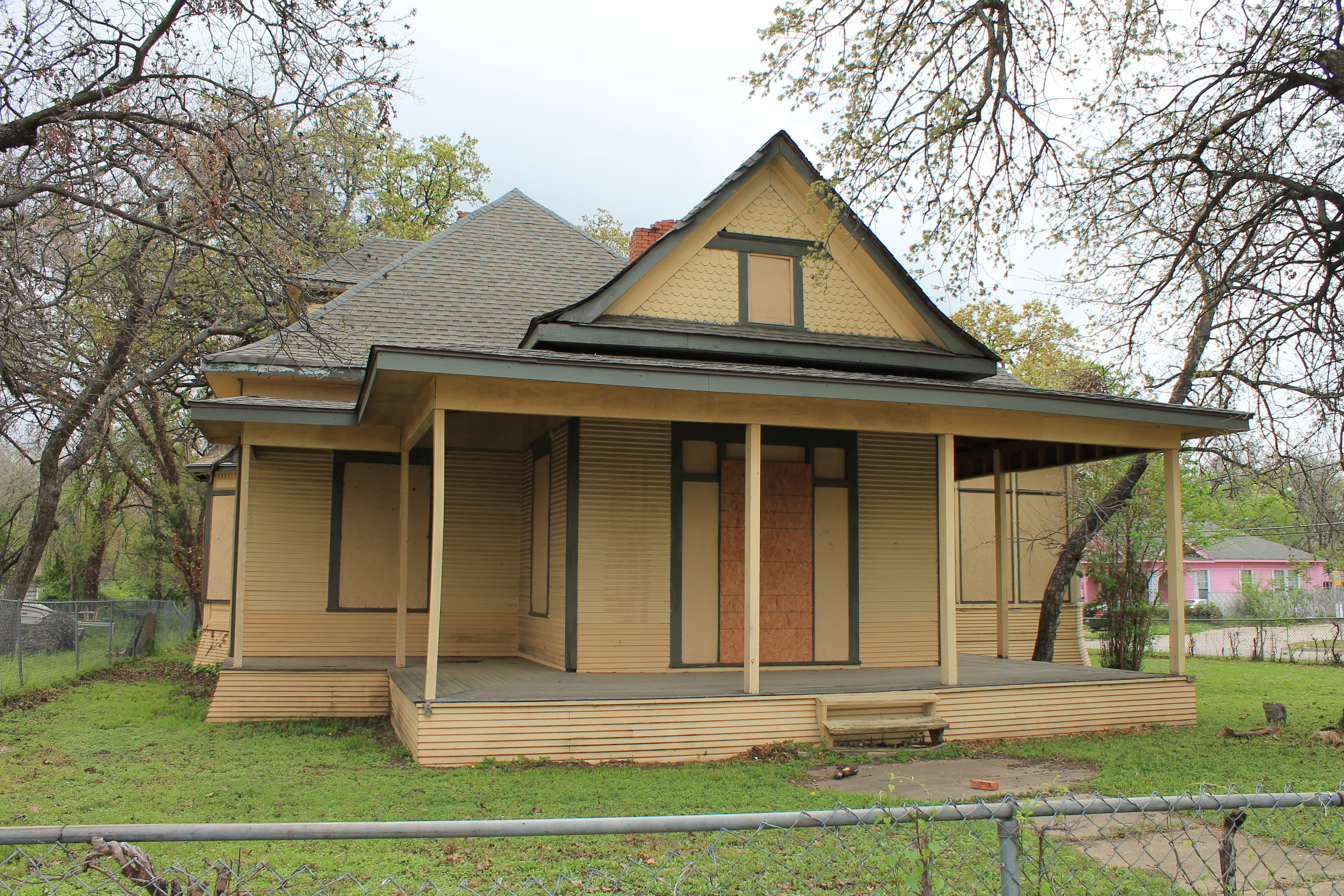
- Ellis House in 2012

- Location within Texas Location within the United States
- Location: 2426 Pine St., Dallas, Texas
- Coordinates: 32°45′17″N 96°45′42″W
- Area: less than one acre
- Built: 1905
- Architectural style: T-plan
- MPS: East and South Dallas MPS
- NRHP reference No.: 95000323
- Added to NRHP: March 23, 1995

The former James H. and Molly Ellis House was located in Dallas, Texas, United States. It was added to the National Register on March 23, 1995. It is notable as a large farmhouse that has survived for over a hundred years in the inner city. The house is the former home of James H. Ellis, who was one of the first real estate developers involved in the construction of modern-day Dallas. The house is also notable as being the last in the area built with Classical Revival style detailing.

On Sunday August 11, 2019 at approximately 4:45am, a structure fire was reported at the Ellis home, and Dallas Fire Dept Station 24 responded to find the home consumed with heavy fire. Dallas Fire Department Engine 06 supplied water. The fire was extinguished, but the damage was too extensive to salvage the home. The remains of the historic Ellis House were demolished by the City of Dallas later that day, due to the unsafe structure.

== Photo gallery ==
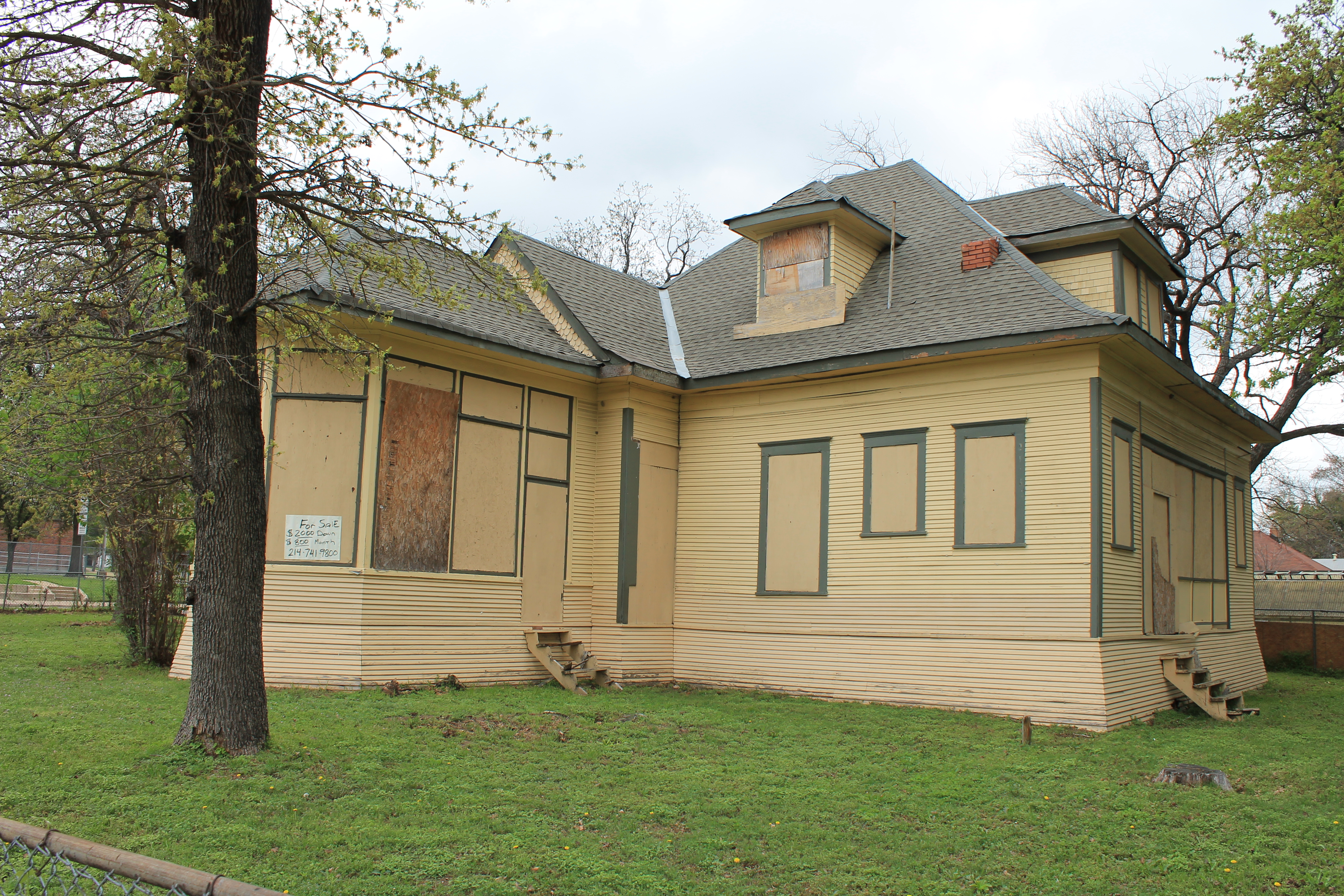

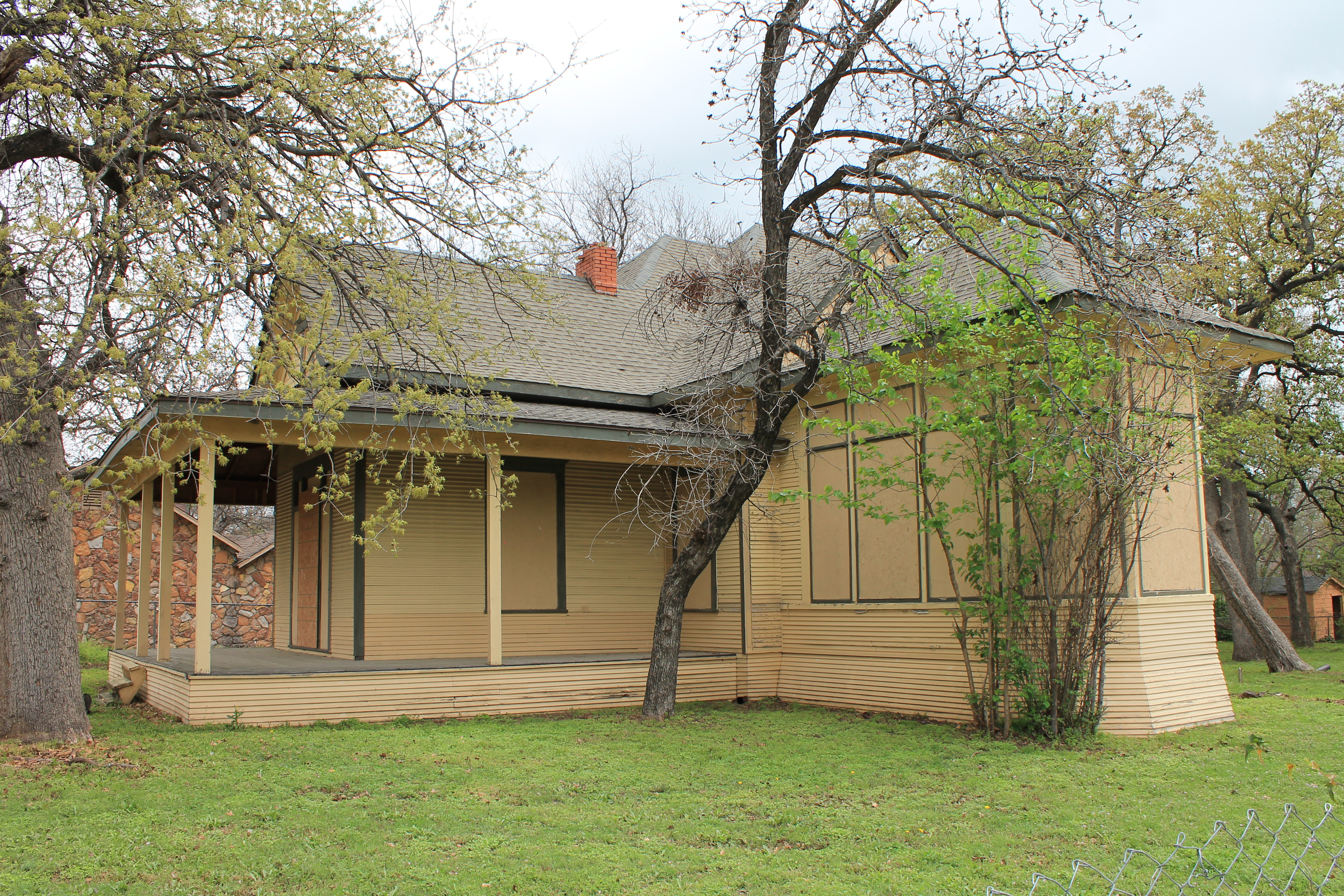

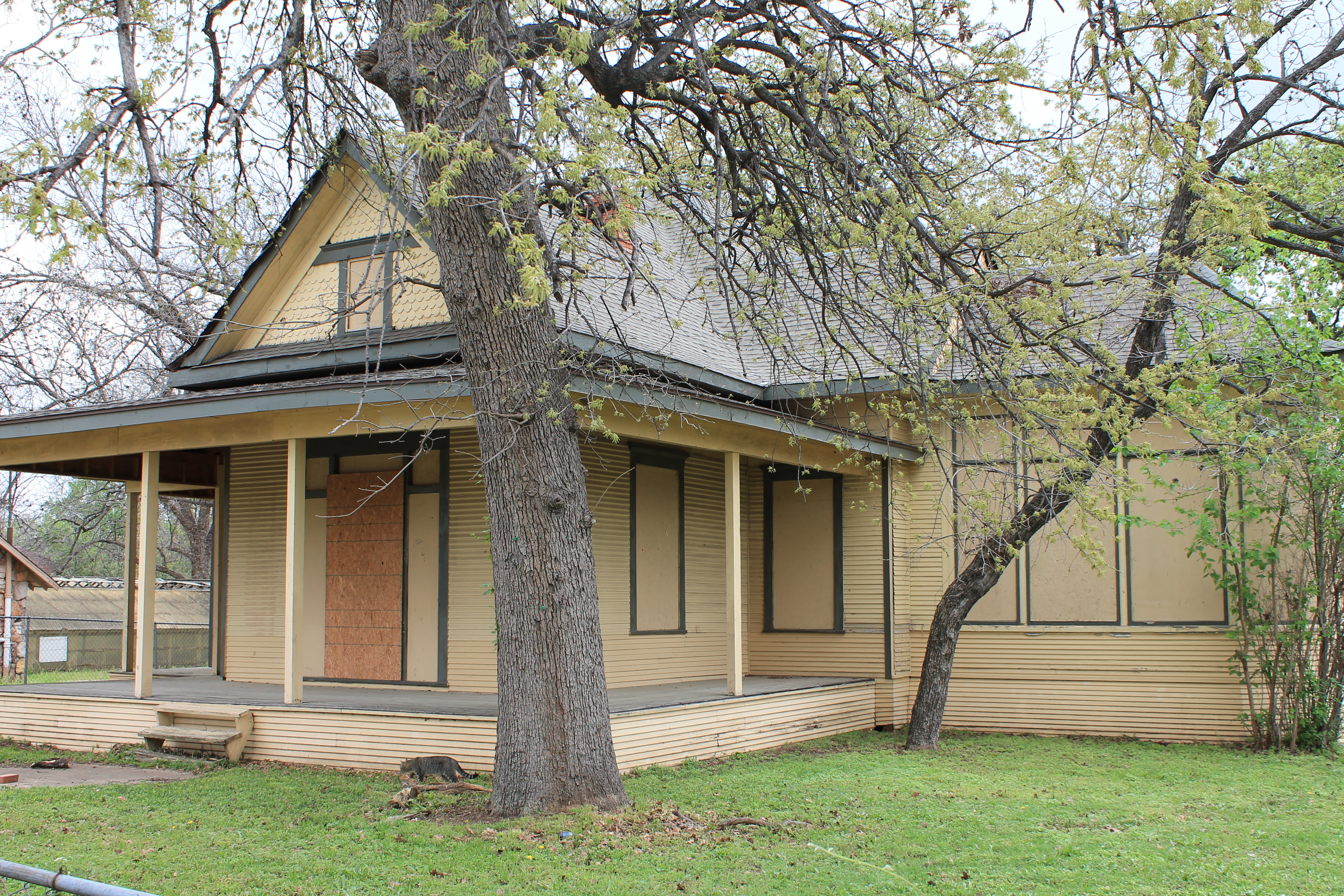

== See also ==
- National Register of Historic Places listings in Dallas County, Texas
