= Grace United Methodist Church (Dallas) =

Historic church in Texas, United States

- Grace Methodist Episcopal Church
- U.S. National Register of Historic Places
- Dallas Landmark
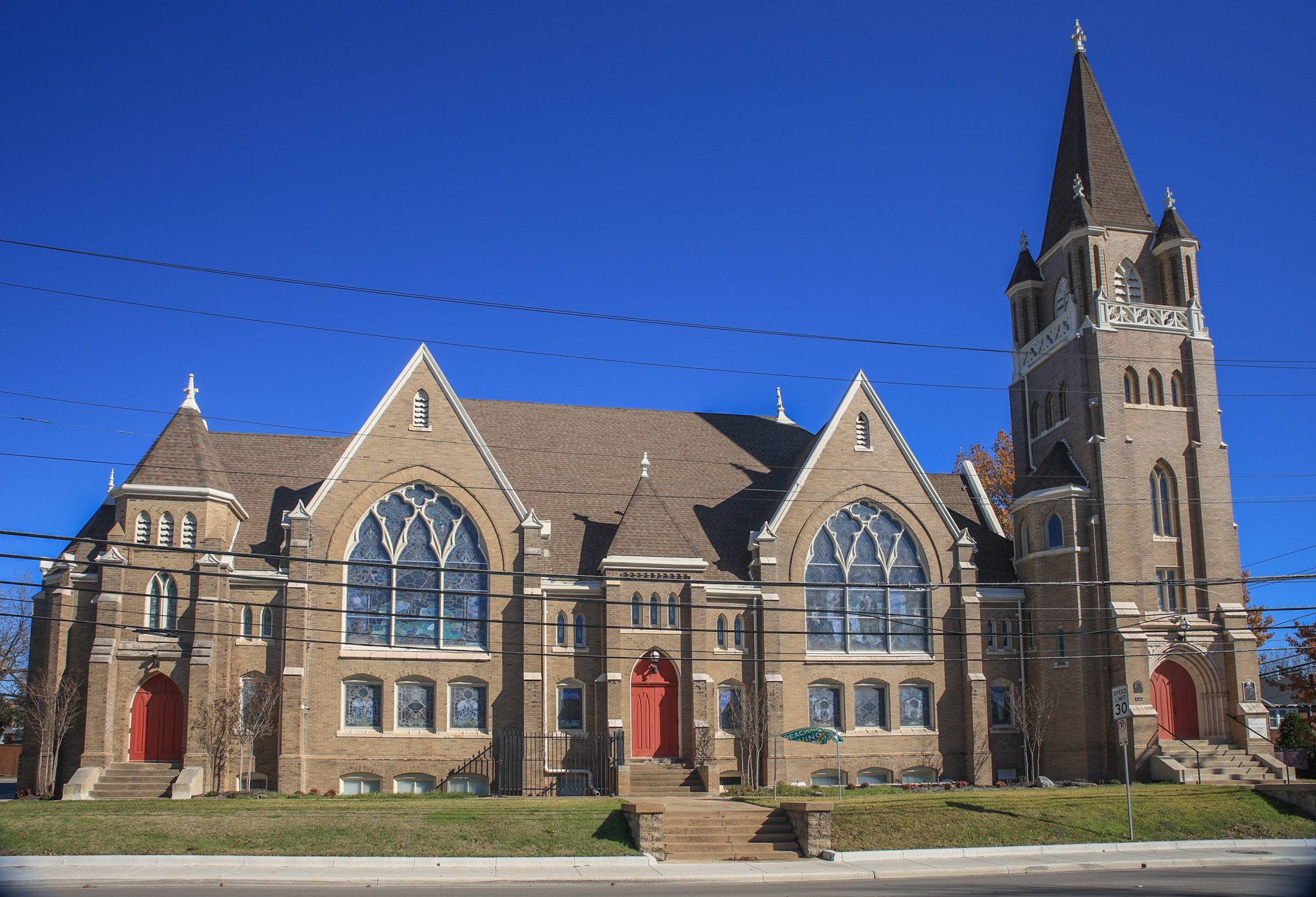
- Grace Methodist Episcopal Church in 2023

- Location within Texas Location within the United States
- Location: 4105 Junius St., Dallas, Texas
- Coordinates: 32°47′36″N 96°46′32″W
- Area: less than one acre
- Built: 1903
- Architect: W.A. Caan
- Architectural style: Gothic Revival
- Website: Grace United Methodist Church
- NRHP reference No.: 82001736
- DLMK No.: H/9

Significant dates
- Added to NRHP: November 4, 1982
- Designated DLMK: December 12, 1979

Grace United Methodist Church, formerly Grace Methodist Episcopal Church, is a historic Methodist church at 4105 Junius Street in Dallas, Texas.

It was built in 1903 and added to the National Register of Historic Places in 1982.

== See also ==
- National Register of Historic Places listings in Dallas County, Texas
- List of Dallas Landmarks
