= Emanuel Lutheran Church (Dallas) =

Historic church in Texas, United States

- U.S. National Register of Historic Places
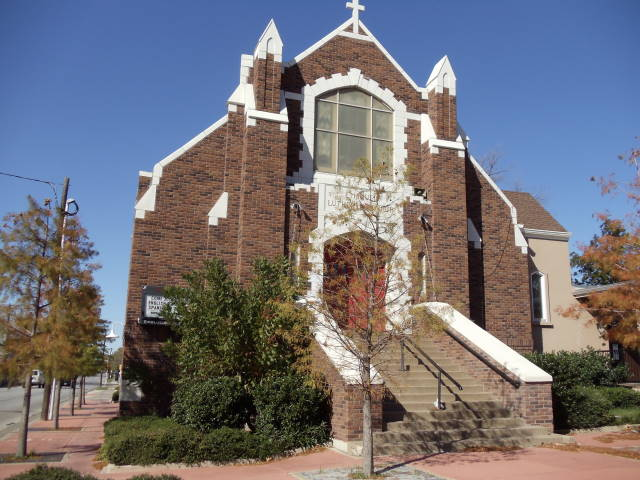
- Emanuel Lutheran Church in 2011

- Location within Texas Location within the United States
- Location: 4301 San Jacinto, Dallas, Texas
- Coordinates: 32°48′2″N 96°46′51″W
- Area: less than one acre
- Built: 1931
- Architectural style: Late Gothic Revival
- Website: Emanuel Lutheran Church
- MPS: East and South Dallas MPS
- NRHP reference No.: 95000315
- Added to NRHP: March 23, 1995

Emanuel Lutheran Church is a historic Lutheran church at 4311 San Jacinto Ave. in Dallas, Texas.

It was built in 1931 and added to the National Register of Historic Places in 1995. The congregation is currently affiliated with the Evangelical Lutheran Church in America.

The building is also home to the Emanuel Community Center.

== See also ==
- National Register of Historic Places listings in Dallas County, Texas
