= Thomas Shiels House =

Historic house in Texas, United States

- U.S. National Register of Historic Places
- Dallas Landmark
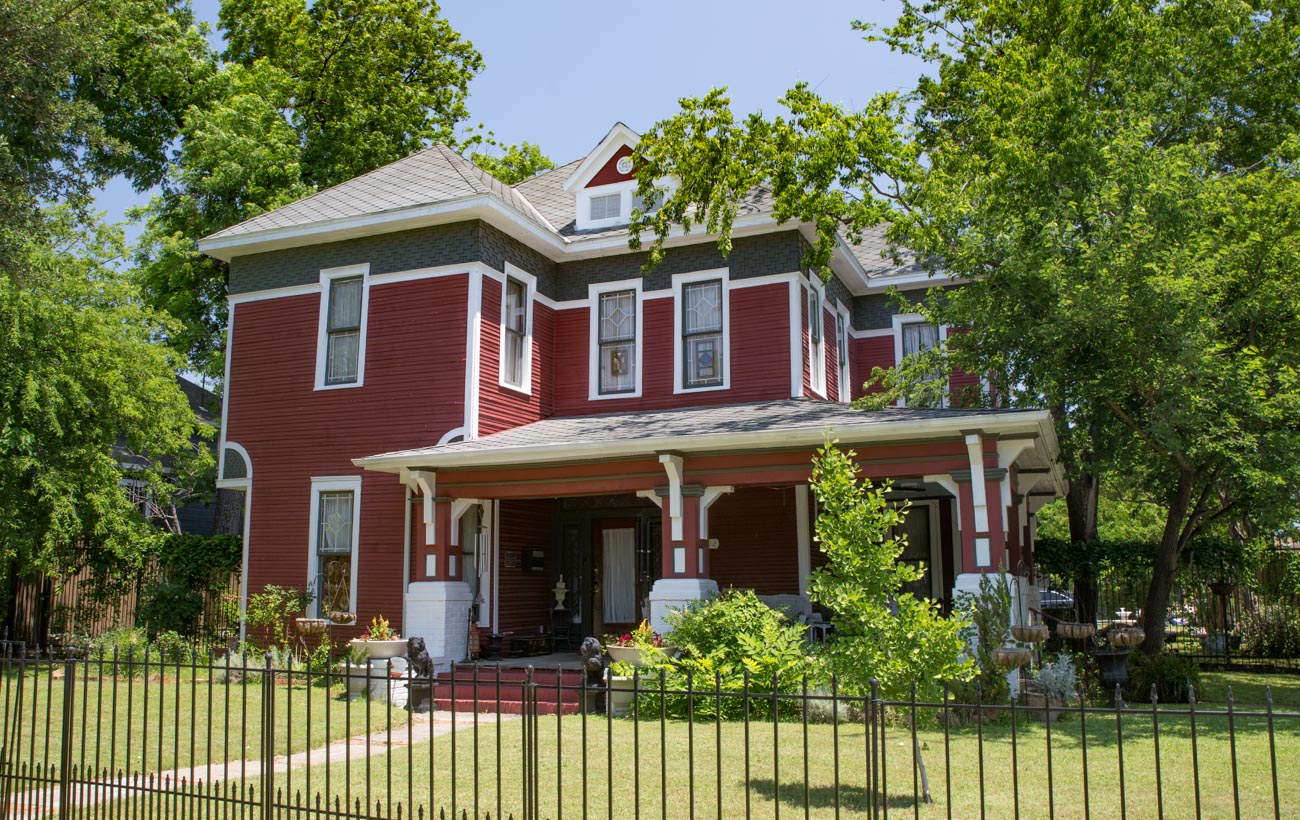
- Shiels House in 2022

- Location within Texas Location within the United States
- Location: 4602 Reiger Ave., Dallas, Texas
- Coordinates: 32°47′37″N 96°46′2″W
- Area: less than one acre
- Built: 1906
- Architectural style: Bungalow/Craftsman
- MPS: East and South Dallas MPS
- NRHP reference No.: 95000312
- DLMK No.: H/132

Significant dates
- Added to NRHP: March 23, 1995
- Designated DLMK: June 13, 2007

The Thomas Shiels House is located in Dallas, Texas.

It was added to the National Register of Historic Places in 1995 and listed for sale in April 2015.

== See also ==
- National Register of Historic Places listings in Dallas County, Texas
- List of Dallas Landmarks
