= Perkins Hall of Administration =

- U.S. National Register of Historic Places
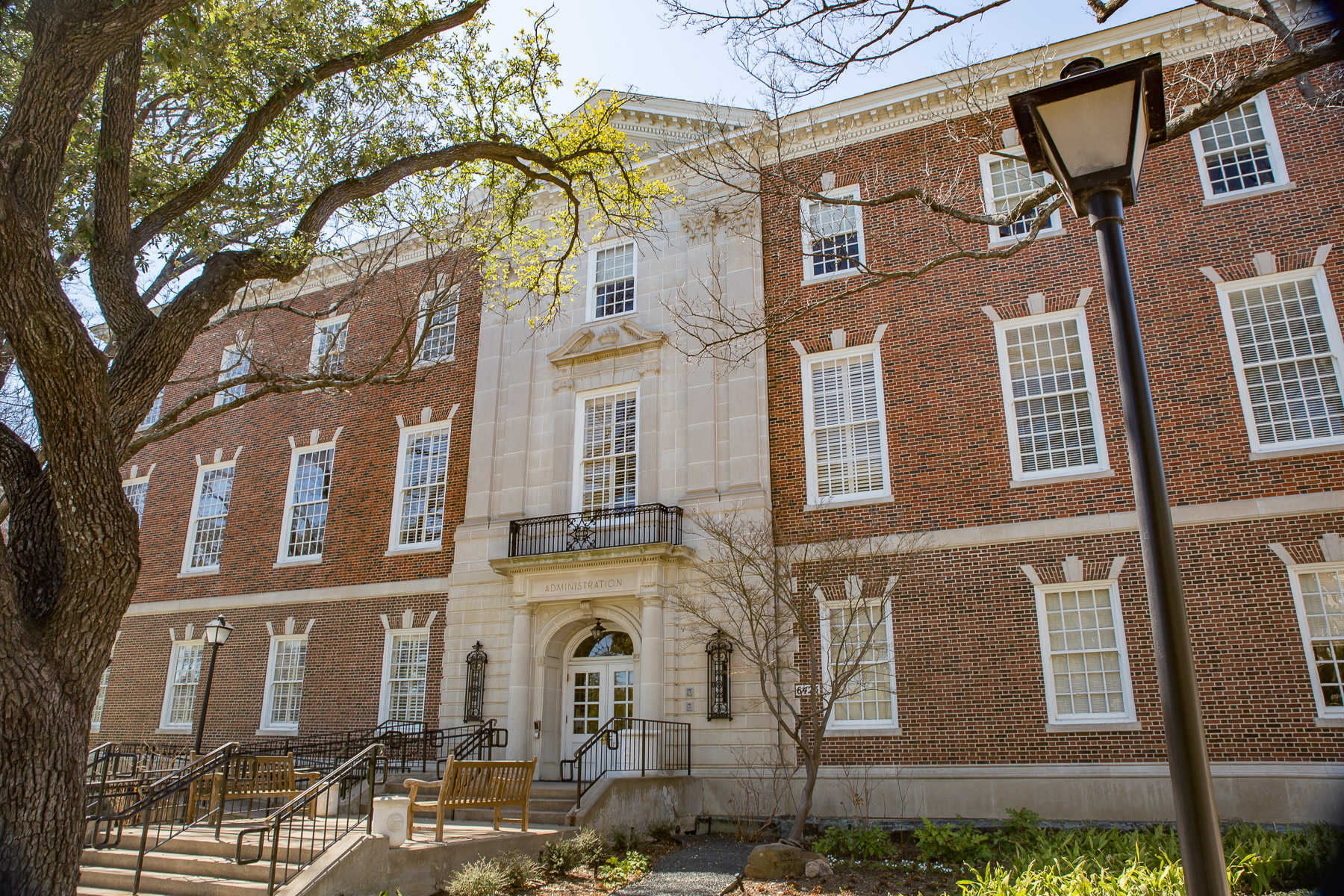
- Perkins Hall in 2022

- Location within Texas Location within the United States
- Location: 6425 Boaz Ln., University Park, Texas
- Coordinates: 32°50′41″N 96°47′09″W
- Area: less than one acre
- Built: 1916
- Architect: DeWitt & Washburn
- Architectural style: Colonial Revival, Georgian Revival
- MPS: Georgian Revival Buildings of Southern Methodist University TR (AD)
- NRHP reference No.: 80004095
- Added to NRHP: September 27, 1980

The Perkins Hall of Administration is a historic building on the campus of Southern Methodist University in University Park, Texas. It was built in 1925, and designed in the Georgian Revival architectural style by DeWitt & Washburn. It has been listed on the National Register of Historic Places since September 27, 1980.

== See also ==
- National Register of Historic Places listings in Dallas County, Texas
