= Kings Highway Conservation District, Dallas =

Historic district in Texas, United States

- King's Highway Historic District
- U.S. National Register of Historic Places
- U.S. Historic district
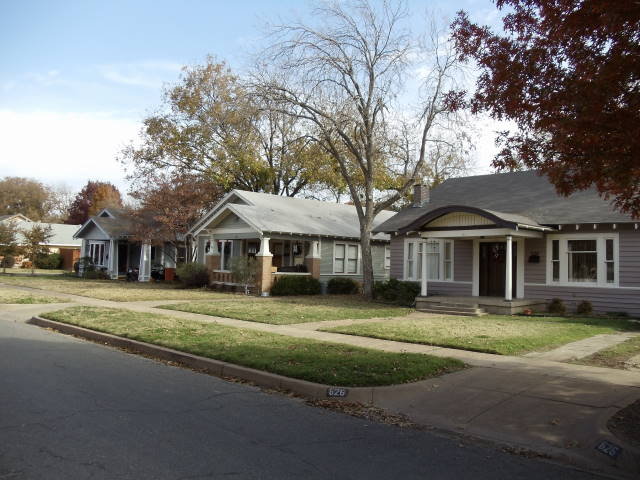
- King's Highway in 2011

- Location within Texas Location within the United States
- Location: 900–1500 Blocks of King's Highway between W. Davis St. and Montclair Ave., Dallas, Texas
- Coordinates: 32°45′7″N 96°50′32″W
- Area: 30 acres (12 ha)
- Architectural style: Bungalow/Craftsman, Four Square
- MPS: Oak Cliff MPS
- NRHP reference No.: 94000606
- Added to NRHP: June 17, 1994

The King's Highway Conservation District is located in the Oak Cliff area of Dallas, Texas (USA). The district is bounded by Stewart Drive on the north, Davis Street on the south, Tyler Street on the east and Mary Cliff Road on the west. It is in Dallas Council District 1.

The conservation district was established in 1988 by Dallas Ordinance 19910, and governs zoning, renovations and replacements, setbacks, etc. Replacement houses are required to meet standards making them similar to the surrounding houses and houses of the period, discouraging teardowns and preventing modern suburban-style architecture.

By land-area, the district primarily contains single family residential homes in Craftsman, Prairie, Eclectic, and Tudor styles. Duplexes and multifamily residential structures are also present, especially along the portion of the Kings Highway near Polk Street.

King's Highway was established as a conservation district in 1988 and was the first of its kind to be established in Dallas.

A quote from the conservation documents:

The homes in the Kings Highway Neighborhood were built primarily in the 1910s and 1920s. Craftsman, Prairie, Eclectic and Tudor styles common to this era are widely represented throughout. During this period, the apartments along the southeastern portion of Kings Highway provided temporary housing for those awaiting the construction of their homes in the adjoining neighborhood of Winnetka Heights.

— City of Dallas Ordinace 19910,

== See also ==
- National Register of Historic Places listings in Dallas County, Texas
