= Trinity English Lutheran Church =

Historic church in Texas, United States

- U.S. National Register of Historic Places
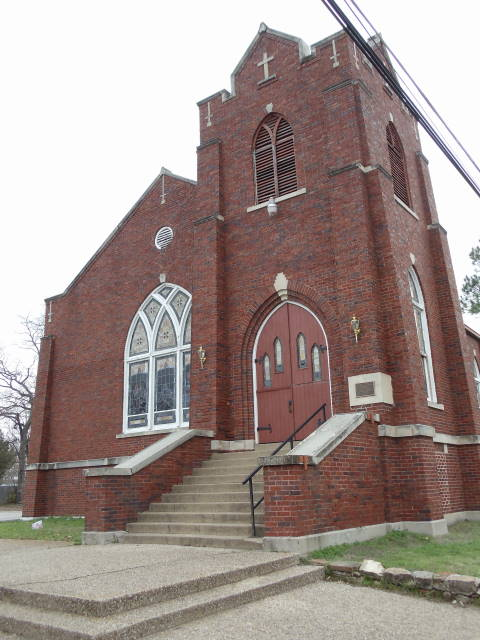
- Trinity Church in 2011

- Location within Texas Location within the United States
- Location: 3100 Martin Luther King, Jr., Blvd., Dallas, Texas
- Coordinates: 32°46′19″N 96°45′52″W
- Area: less than one acre
- Built: 1922
- Architectural style: Late Gothic Revival
- MPS: East and South Dallas MPS
- NRHP reference No.: 95000319
- Added to NRHP: March 23, 1995

Trinity English Lutheran Church (now known as the Mount Olive Lutheran Church) is a historic Lutheran church at 3100 Martin Luther King, Jr., Boulevard in Dallas, Texas. The congregation is currently part of the Evangelical Lutheran Church in America.

The late Gothic Revival church building was constructed in 1922 and added to the National Register of Historic Places in 1995.

== See also ==
- National Register of Historic Places listings in Dallas County, Texas
