= Fred Florence Hall =

- U.S. National Register of Historic Places
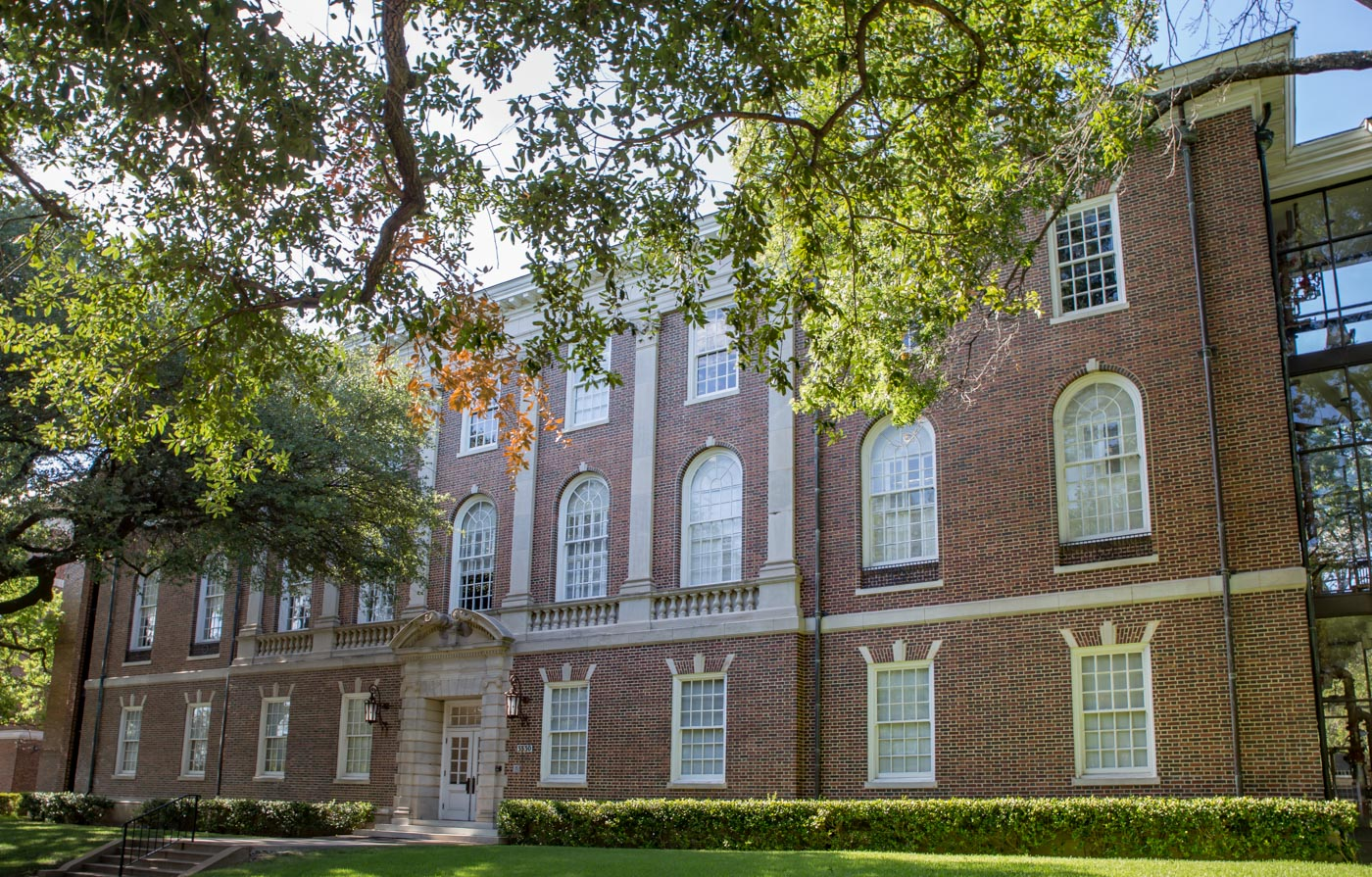
- Fred Florence Hall in 2022

- Location within Texas Location within the United States
- Location: 3330 University Blvd., University Park, Texas
- Coordinates: 32°50′43″N 96°47′10″W
- Area: 1 acre (0.40 ha)
- Built: 1924
- Architect: DeWitt & Lemmon
- Architectural style: Colonial Revival, Georgian Revival
- MPS: Georgian Revival Buildings of Southern Methodist University TR (AD)
- NRHP reference No.: 80004089
- Added to NRHP: September 27, 1980

Fred Florence Hall is a historic building on the campus of Southern Methodist University in University Park, Texas, U.S.. It was built in 1924, and designed by DeWitt & Lemmon in the Georgian Revival architectural style. It has been listed on the National Register of Historic Places since September 27, 1980.

== See also ==
- National Register of Historic Places listings in Dallas County, Texas
