= Jacob and Eliza Spake House =

Historic house in Texas, United States

- U.S. National Register of Historic Places
- Dallas Landmark Historic District; Contributing Property
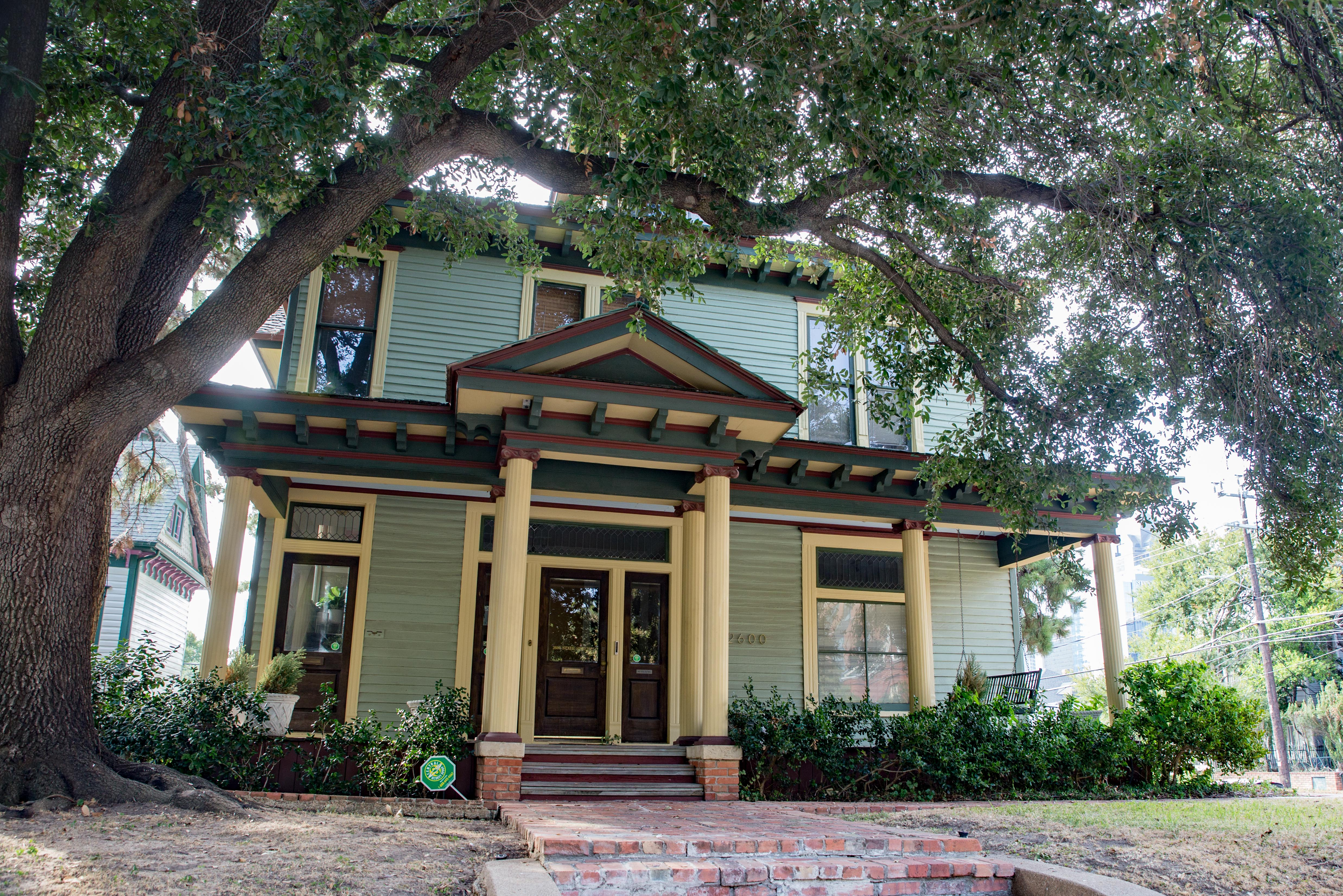
- Spake House in 2012

- Location within Texas Location within the United States
- Location: 2600 State St., Dallas, Texas
- Coordinates: 32°47′43″N 96°47′58″W
- Area: less than one acre
- Built: 1890
- Architect: Edward T. Overand
- Architectural style: Mixed
- NRHP reference No.: 85002912
- DLMKHD No.: H/25 (State Thomas HD)

Significant dates
- Added to NRHP: November 21, 1985
- Designated DLMKHD: March 19, 1986

Jacob and Eliza Spake House is located at 2600 State Street in Dallas, Texas, United States. The house was added to the National Register of Historic Places on November 21, 1985.

== Photo gallery ==
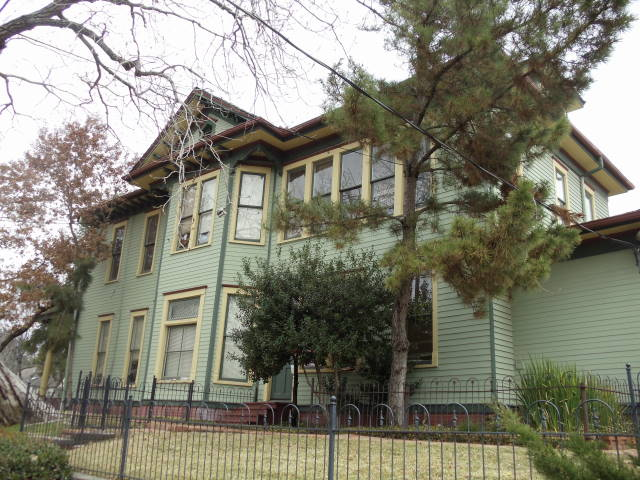

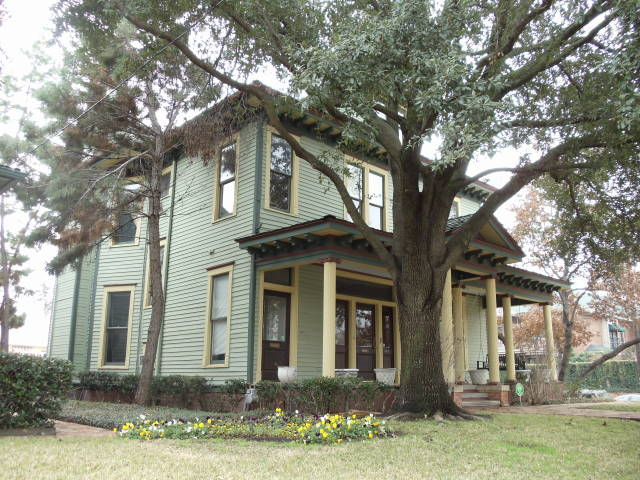

== See also ==
- National Register of Historic Places listings in Dallas County, Texas
- List of Dallas Landmarks
