= Dallas Hall =

- U.S. National Register of Historic Places
- Recorded Texas Historic Landmark
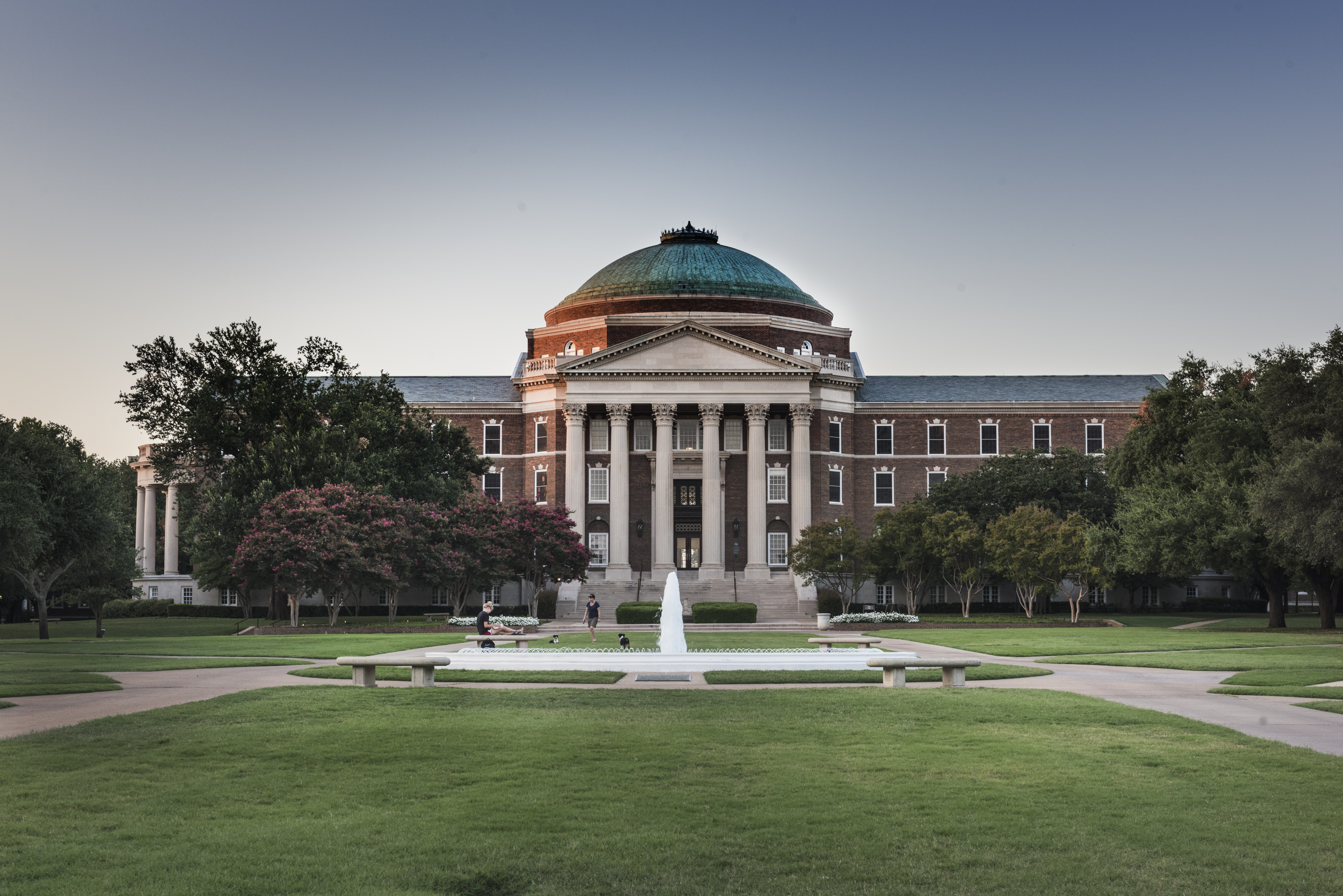
- Location: 3225 University Blvd., University Park, Texas
- Coordinates: 32°50′42″N 96°47′5″W
- Area: Less than one acre
- Built: 1915
- Architect: Shepley, Rutan & Coolidge
- Architectural style: Colonial Revival, Neo-Georgian
- MPS: Georgian Revival Buildings of Southern Methodist University TR (AD)
- NRHP reference No.: 78002913
- RTHL No.: 6670

Significant dates
- Added to NRHP: November 17, 1978
- Designated RTHL: 1979

Dallas Hall is a historic building on the campus of Southern Methodist University (SMU) in University Park, Texas. Influenced by the Roman Pantheon and architecture by Thomas Jefferson, it was constructed by the architectural firm of Shepley, Rutan and Coolidge in 1915. The first building on campus, it housed most of the university's operations. The campus has since been expanded around Dallas Hall, but it remains the center of SMU. It was named to the National Register of Historic Places in 1978.

== History ==
Dallas Hall was designed by the Chicago branch of the architectural firm Shepley, Rutan and Coolidge. Robert Stewart Hyer (1860–1929), the first President of SMU, chose Georgian architecture after the Thomas Jefferson-designed architecture of the University of Virginia in Charlottesville, Virginia. The building's architecture was inspired by the Pantheon. As a sign of appreciation towards local citizens who had given 622.5 acres and $300,000 to found the campus, it was named "Dallas Hall" in their honor.

Construction began in 1912, and the cornerstone was laid on November 28, 1912. It was dedicated in 1915, making it the first building on campus. The site chosen for Dallas Hall is one of the highest points in Dallas County. It stood alone on a flat prairie. This, and the building's monumental size, is the origin of SMU's nickname, "The Hilltop". Constructed of brick, it is three stories tall. The building was oriented so that the crest of the building perfectly aligned with the Praetorian Building, then the tallest building in Dallas.

Upon its opening, all of the university's facilities, except for female dorms and temporary housing for some male students, were housed in Dallas Hall. It housed all classrooms for a decade after opening. Over the years, it has been home to classrooms, offices, a chapel, a hamburger grill, a post office and a barbershop. A highly symmetrical campus has since been constructed around Dallas Hall. It celebrated its 100th anniversary on November 12, 2012, with a dinner for university administrators and donors. It has been listed on the National Register of Historic Places since November 17, 1978.

Dallas Hall is used for SMU's convocations and graduations.

== Image gallery ==
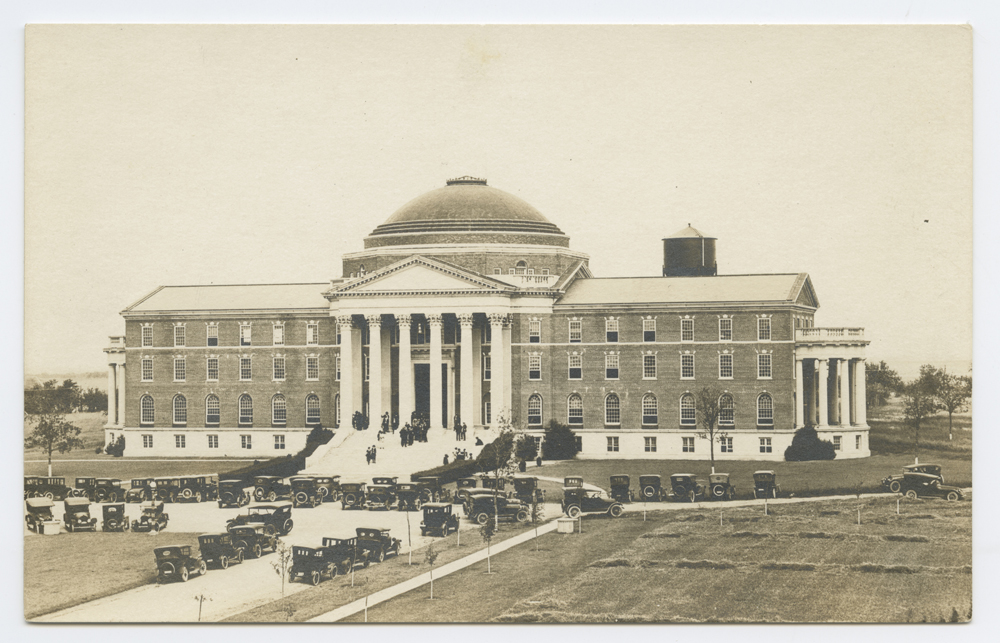
Dallas Hall in 1921

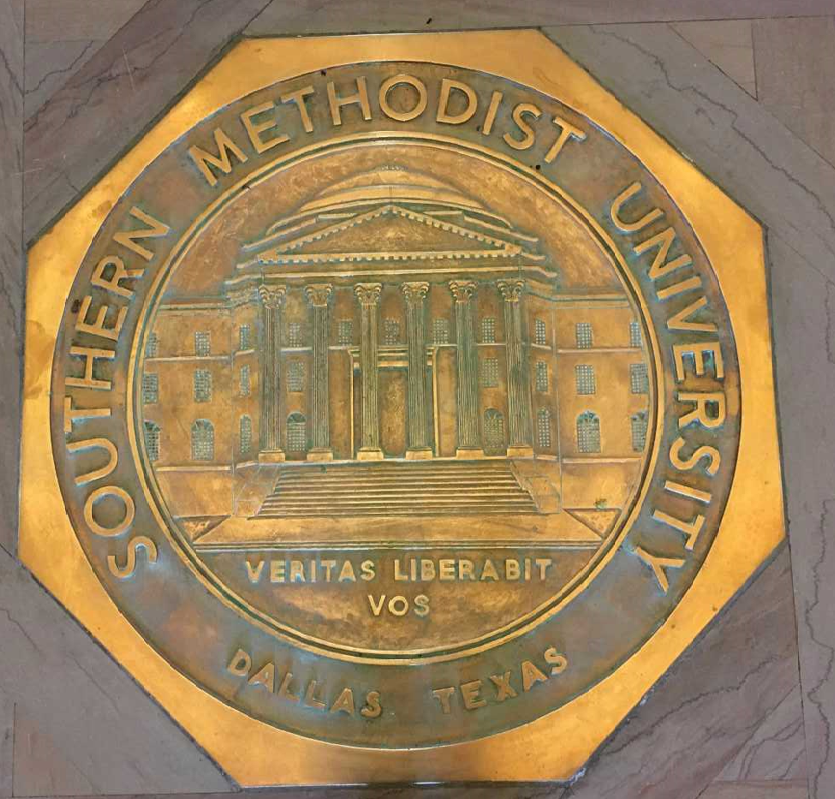
School's seal within the building

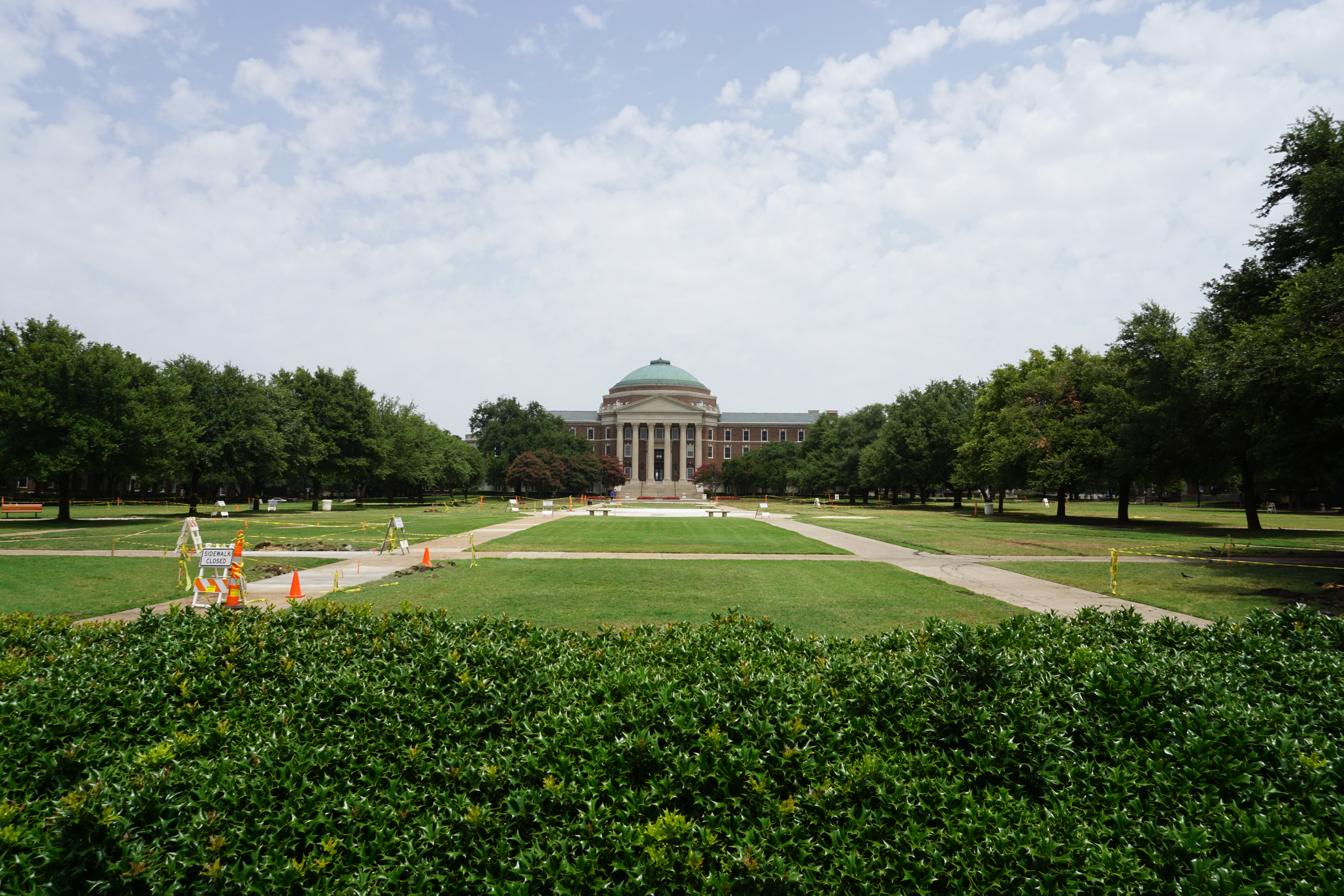
A distant view

== See also ==
- National Register of Historic Places listings in Dallas County, Texas
- Recorded Texas Historic Landmarks in Dallas County
