= North Bishop Avenue Commercial Historic District =

Historic district in Texas, United States

- U.S. National Register of Historic Places
- U.S. Historic district
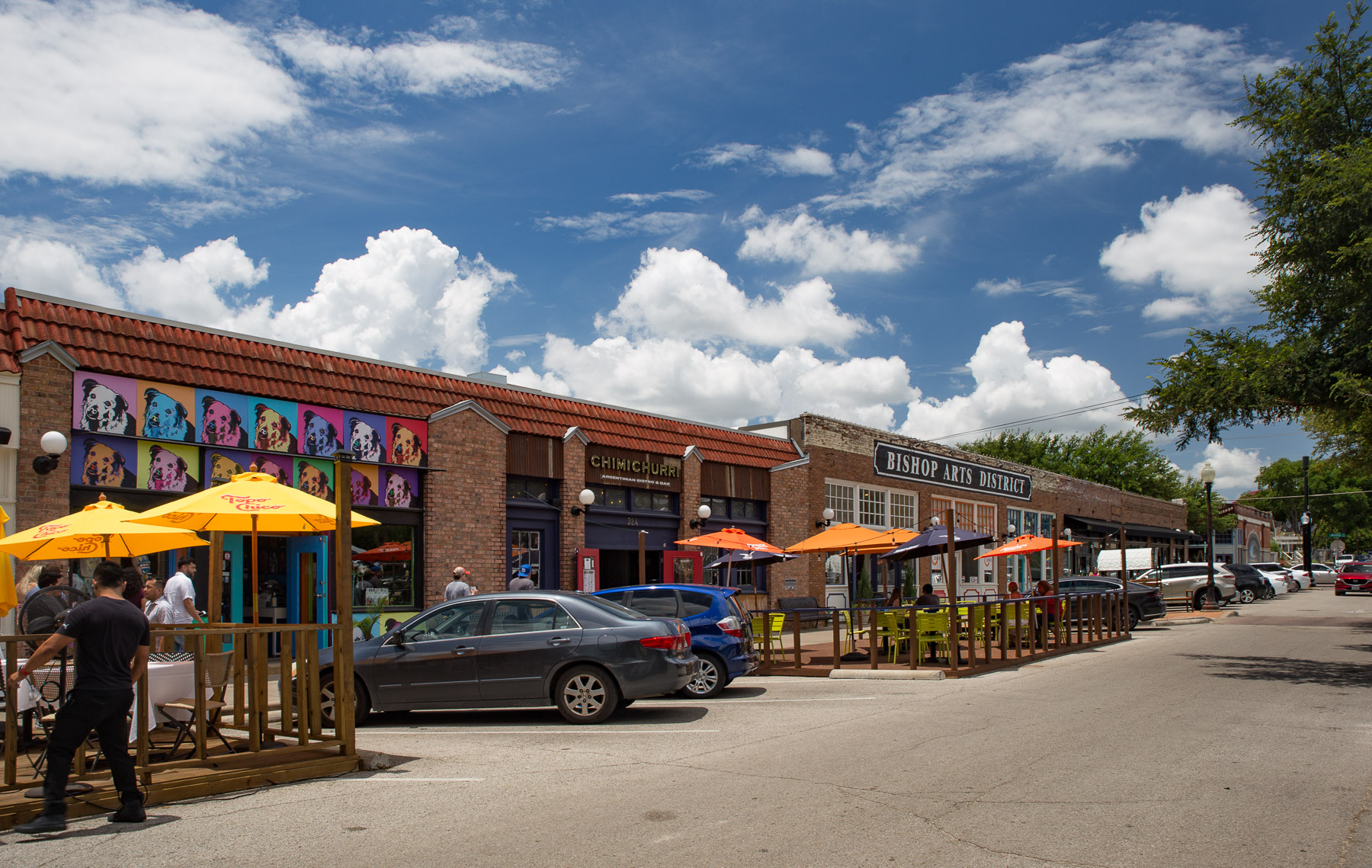
- 300 block W. 7th St. in 2012

- Location within Texas Location within the United States
- Location: Roughly bounded by 9th St., Davis St., Adams and Madison, Dallas, Texas
- Coordinates: 32°44′50″N 96°49′42″W
- Area: 12 acres (4.9 ha)
- Architectural style: Primarily Vernacular
- MPS: Oak Cliff MPS (64500648)
- NRHP reference No.: 94000608
- Added to NRHP: 17 June 1994

North Bishop Avenue Commercial Historic District is located in Dallas, Texas (USA).

== History ==
The North Bishop Avenue Commercial Historic District is bounded by Davis St to the north, Madison Ave to the east, 9th St to the south, and Adams St to the west. It was added to the National Register of Historic Places on June 17, 1994 as a part of the "Oak Cliff Multiple Property Submission". The district contains the original core of the Bishop Arts District.

North Bishop Avenue is the only street in the Oak Cliff neighborhood that can be considered a boulevard. The district is located within the Hillside Addition, one of several sub–divisions built by the Dallas Land and Loan Company which was headed by Thomas Marsalis, the founder of Oak Cliff.

== Today ==
Bike lanes and period lighting have been added to Bishop Avenue and recent development has been historically appropriate and scaled to fit the historical neighborhood. Tax incentives may be available to neighborhoods listed on the National Register but there is no legal protection from destruction, there are no local laws that provide such protection for the North Bishop Avenue Commercial Historic District.

== Photo gallery ==
Photographs of the historic district
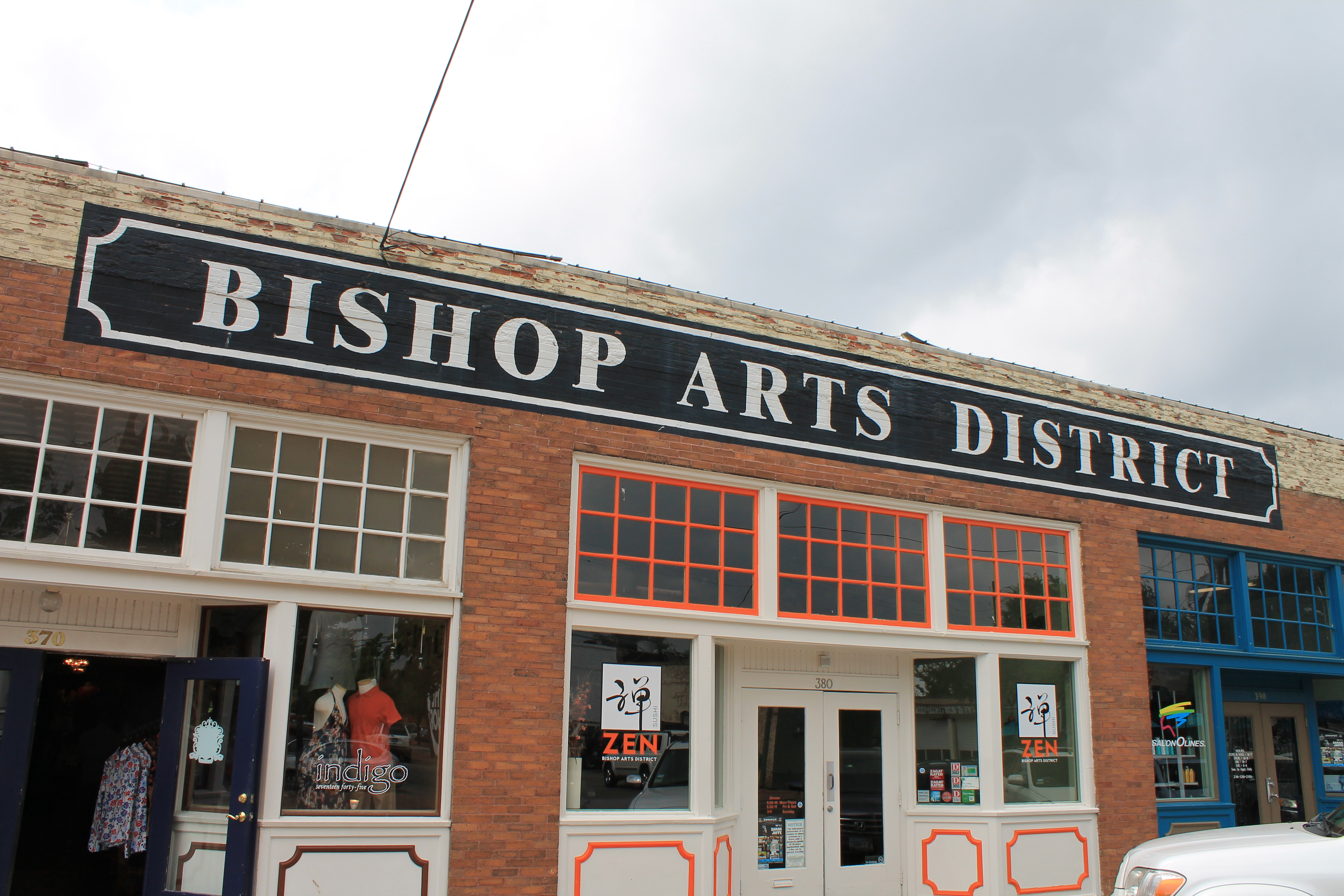
Old brick commercial building with signage "Bishop Arts District" above several of the shops (2012)

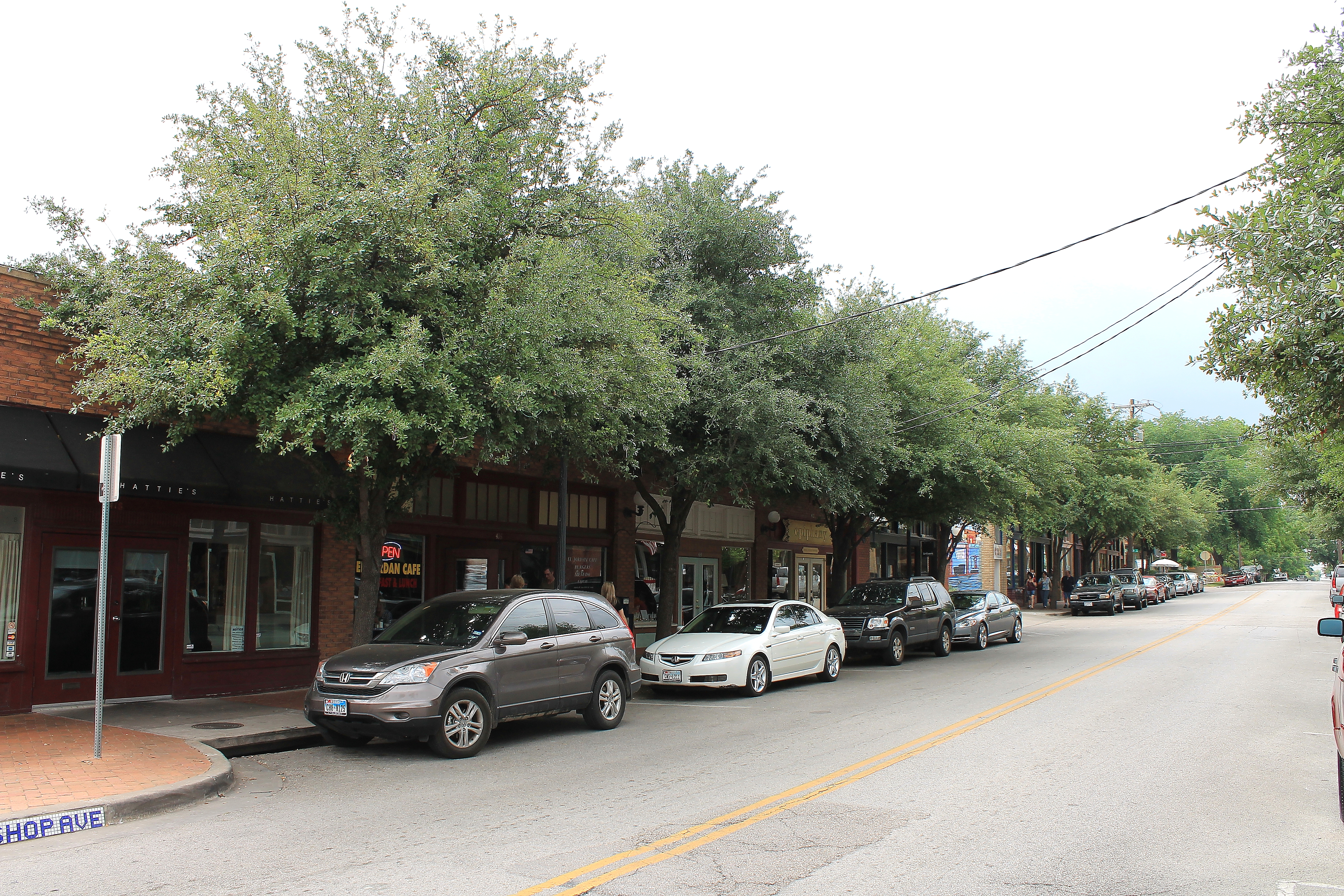
Tree lined streets with broad walkways on Bishop Avenue (2012)

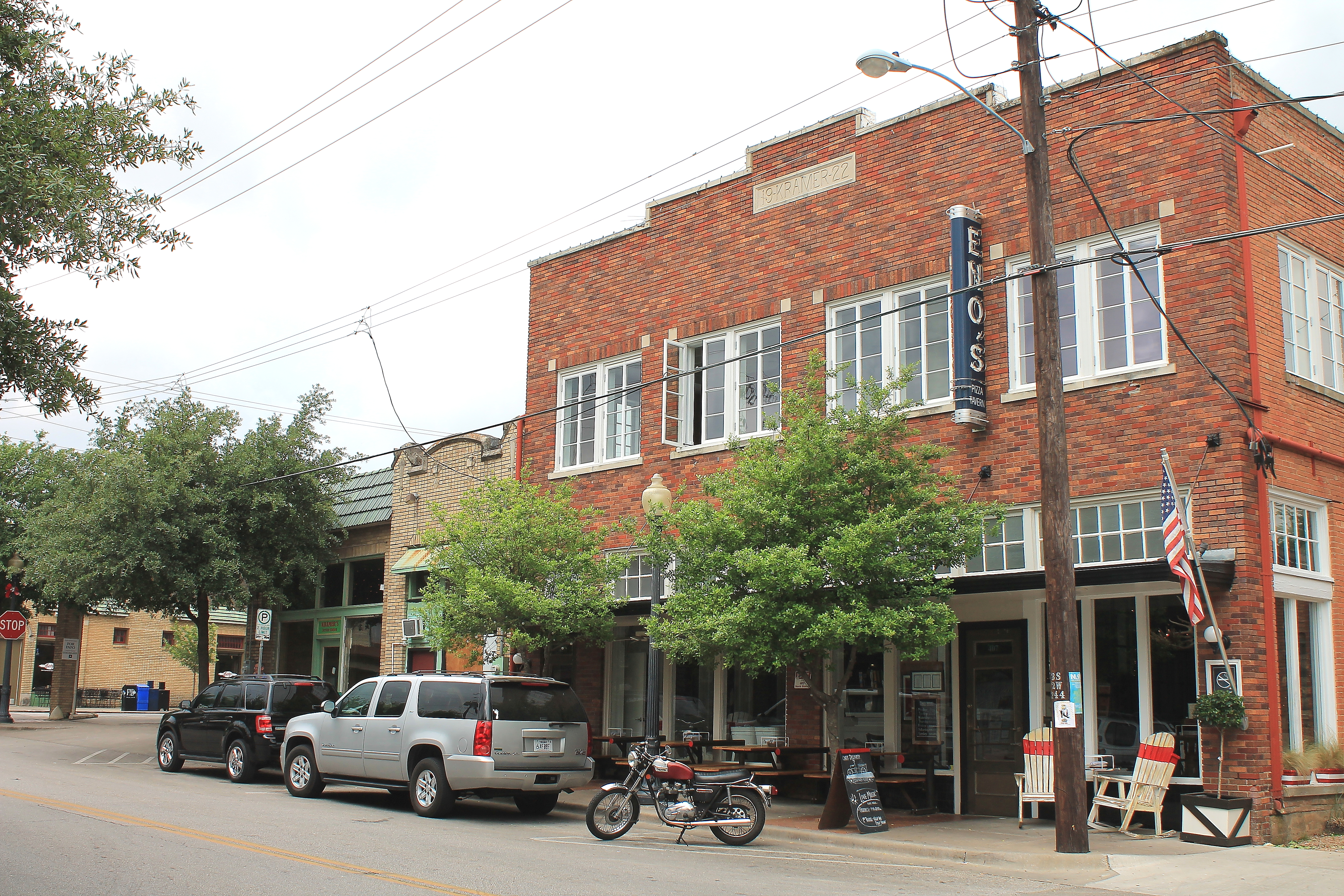
Historic brick building with stepped parapet (2012)
Photography: Renelibrary (2012)

== See also ==
- Arts district
- National Register of Historic Places listings in Dallas County, Texas
