= Greenway Parks Historic District =

Historic district in Texas, United States

- U.S. National Register of Historic Places
- U.S. Historic district
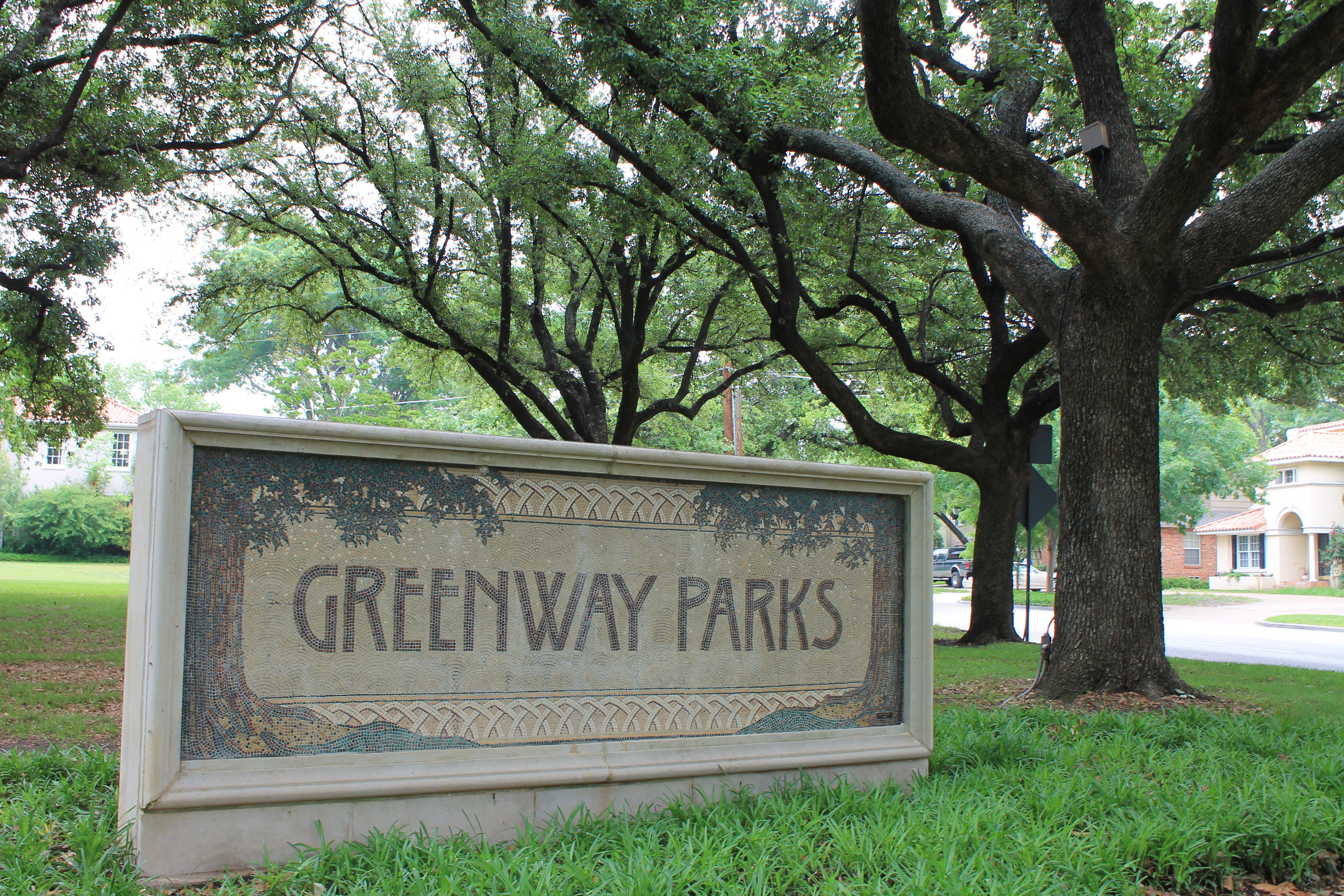
- Greenway Parks sign in 2012

- Location within Texas Location within the United States
- Location: Bounded by W. Mockingbird Ln., W. University Blvd., Inwood & N. Dallas Tollway., Dallas, Texas
- Coordinates: 32°50′27″N 96°49′4″W
- Area: 150 acres (61 ha)
- Built: 1927
- Architect: George Allen, et al.
- Architectural style: Late 19th and 20th Century Revivals, Modern Movement
- MPS: Historic Residential Suburbs in the United States, 1830-1960 MPS
- NRHP reference No.: 07001383
- Added to NRHP: January 10, 2008

Greenway Parks Historic District is located in Dallas, Texas.

The district was added to the National Register of Historic Places on July 10, 2008.

== Photo gallery ==
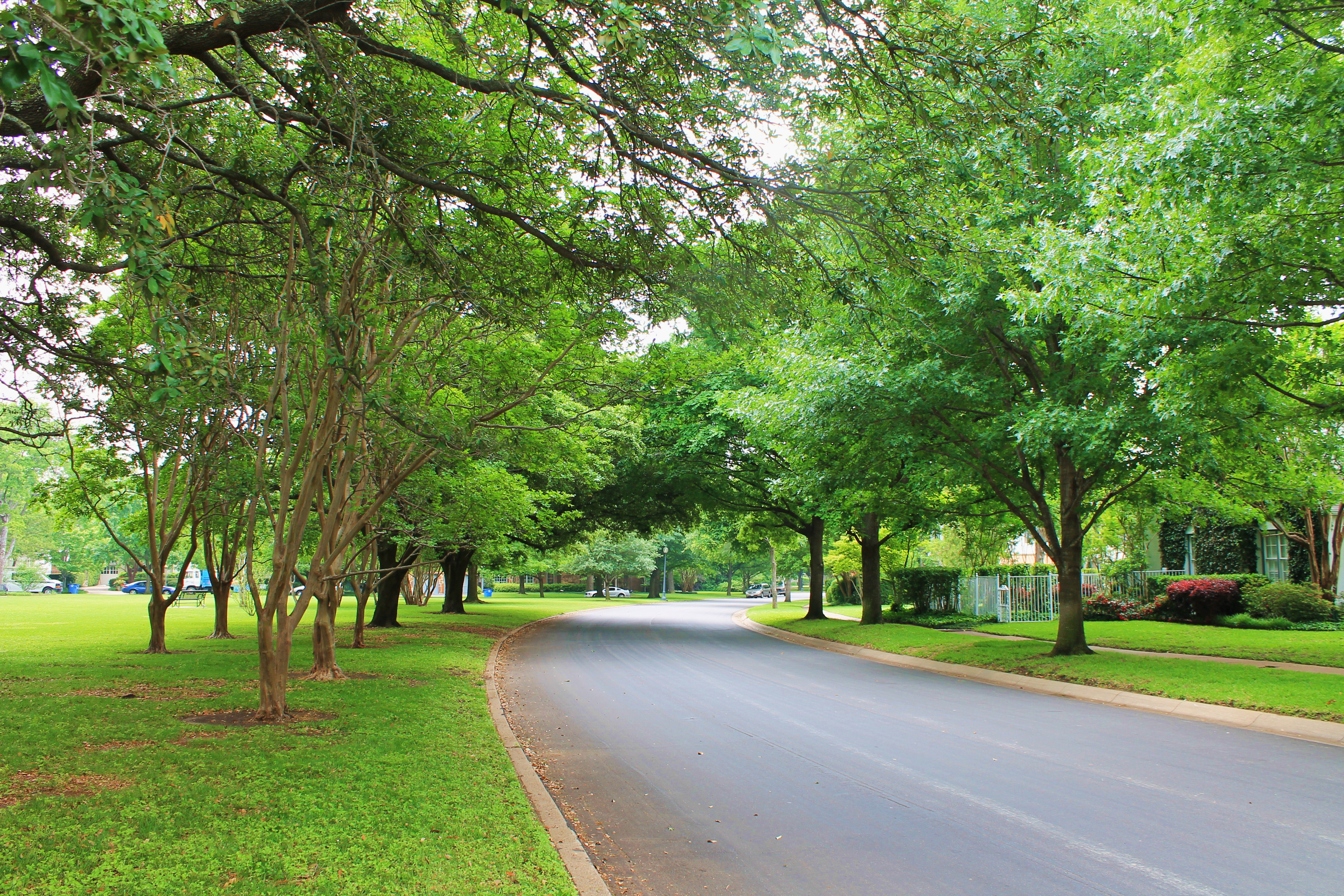

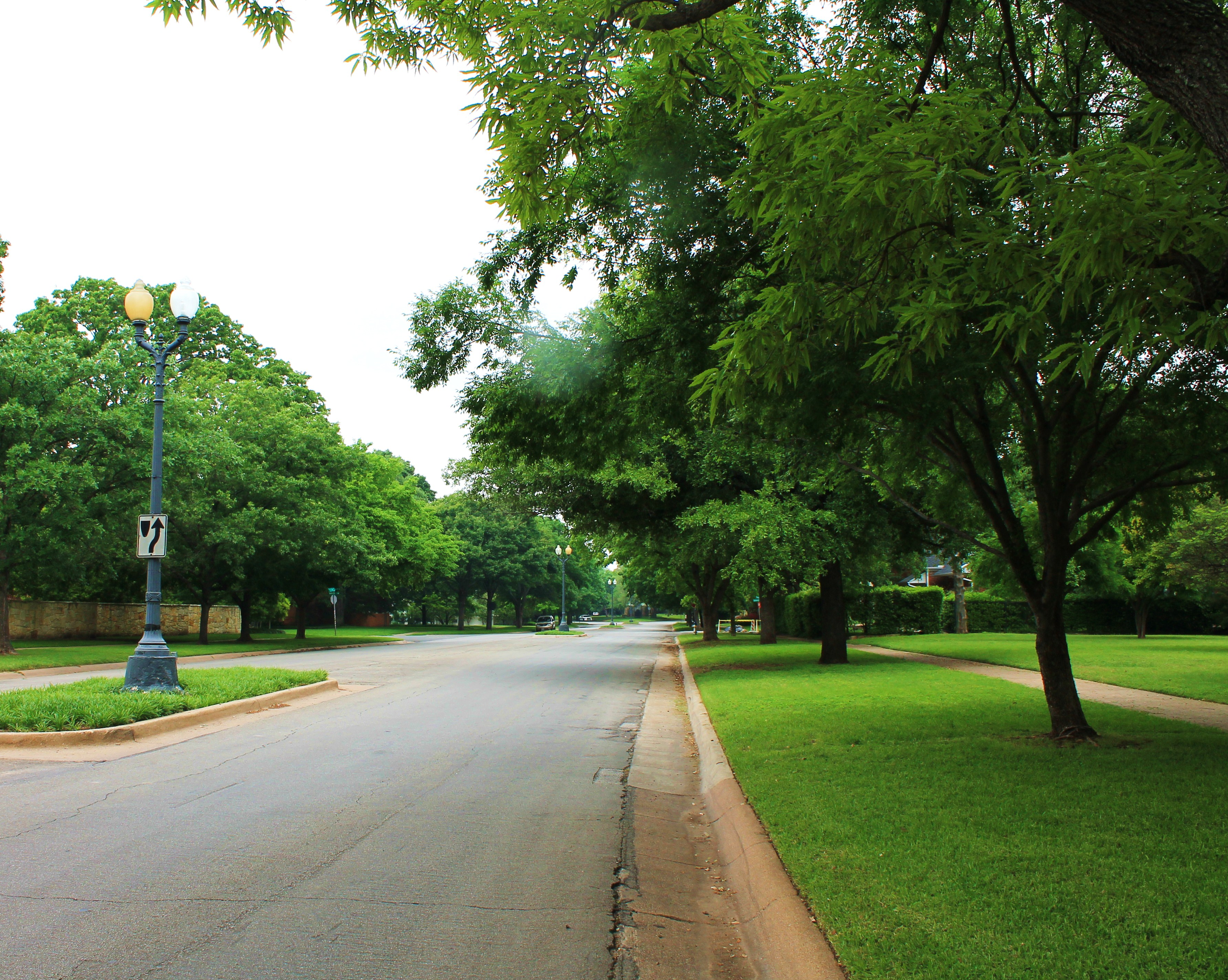

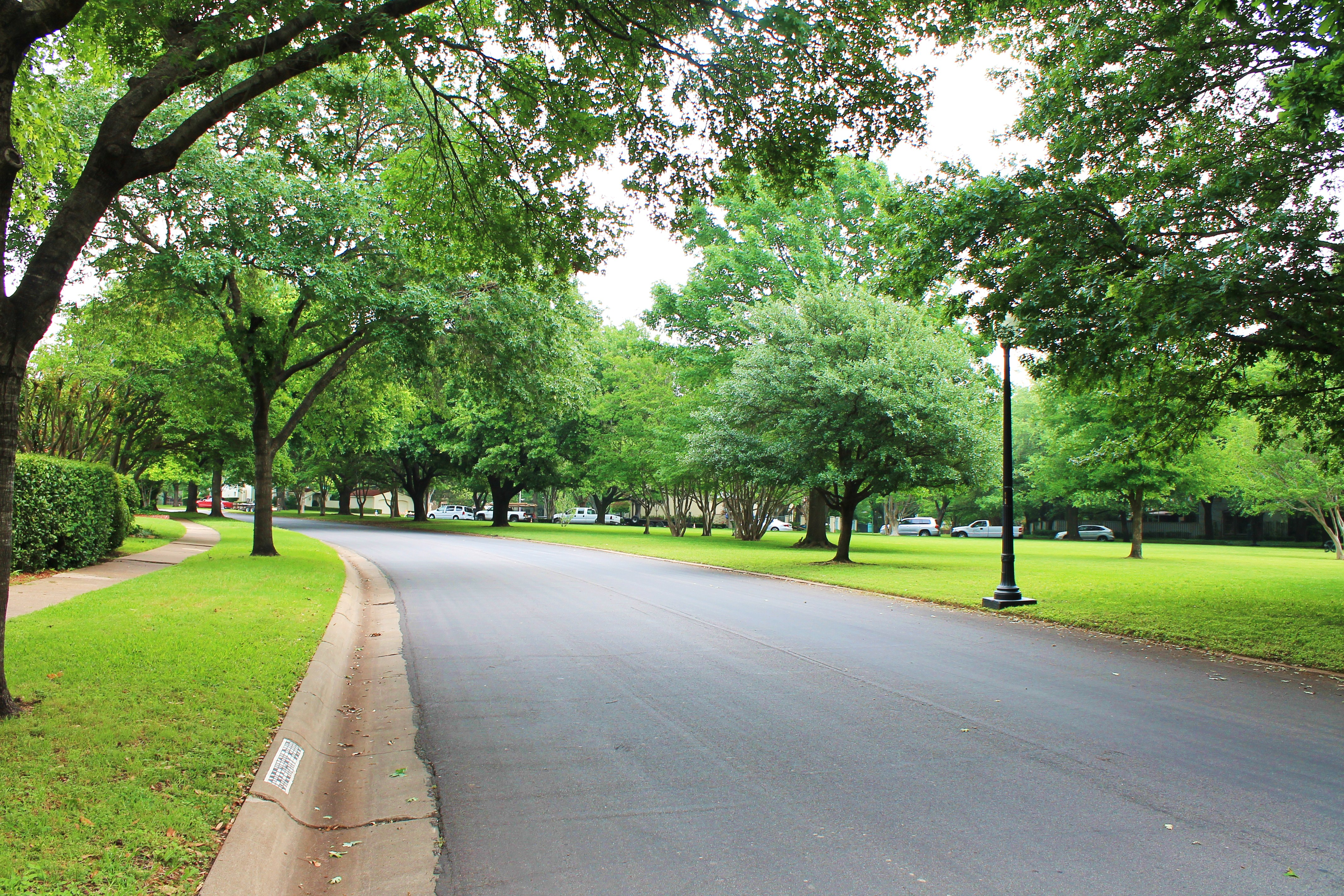

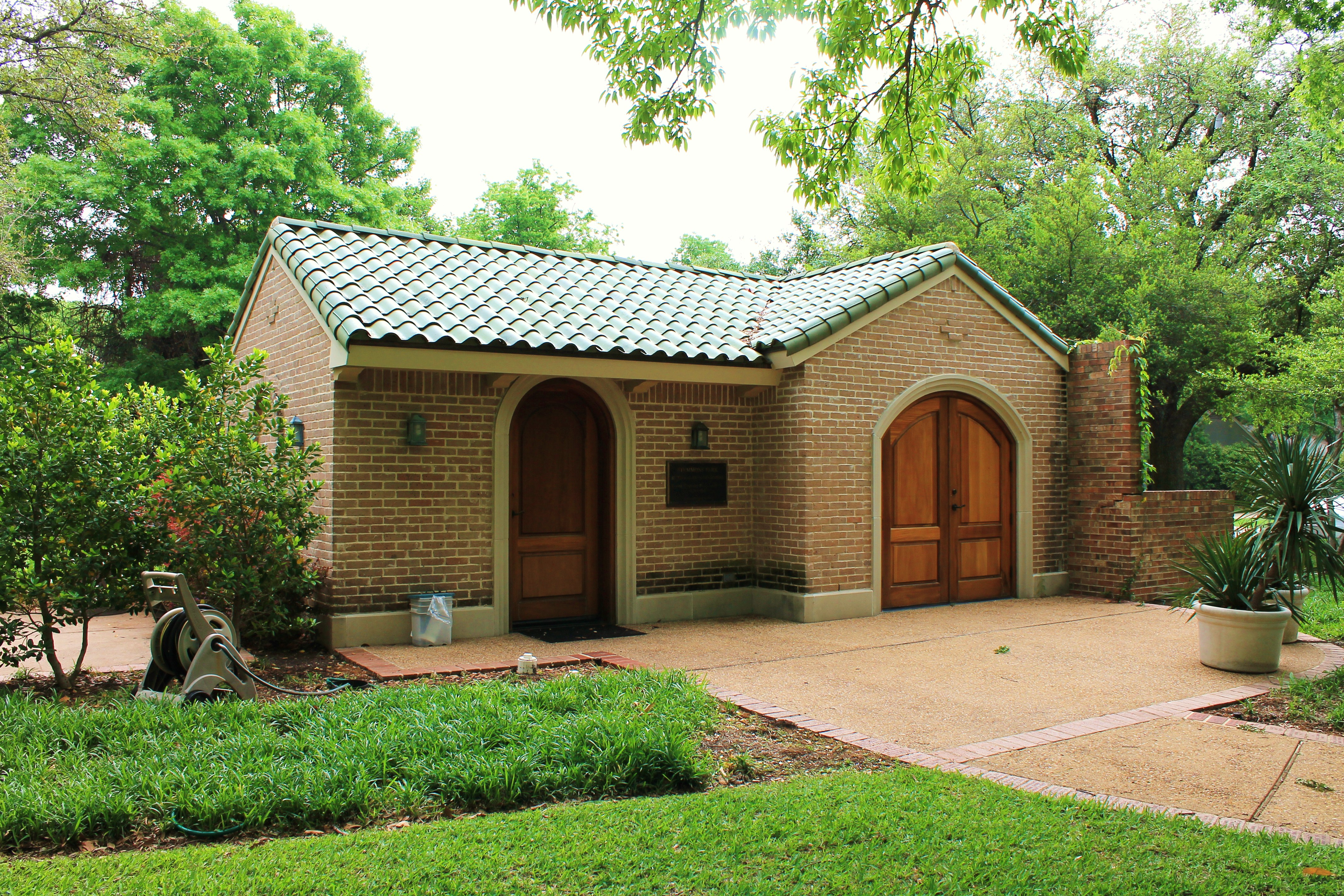

== See also ==
- National Register of Historic Places listings in Dallas County, Texas
