= Medical Dental Building (Dallas) =

- U.S. National Register of Historic Places
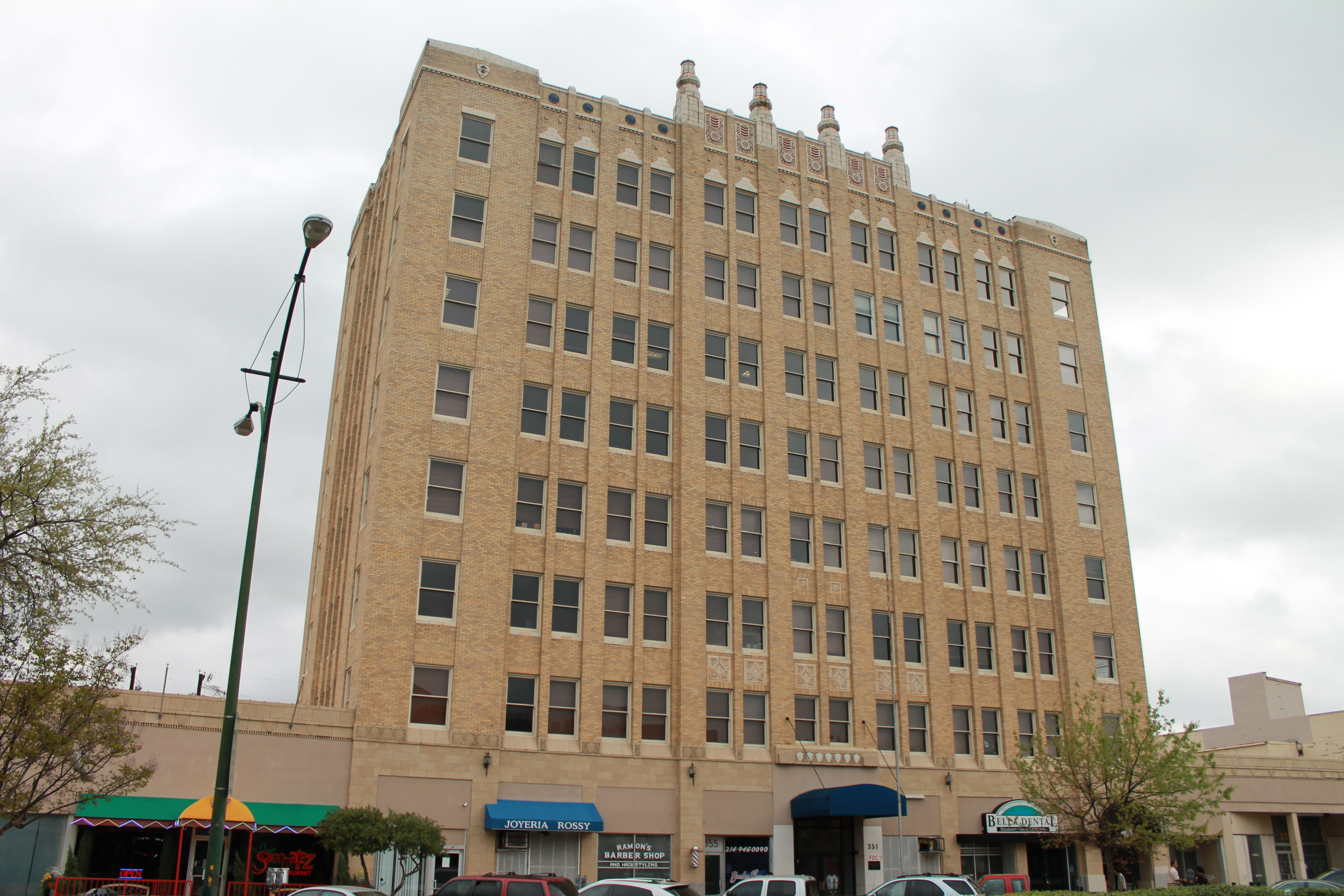
- The building's exterior in 2012

- Location within Texas Location within the United States
- Location: 351 W. Jefferson Blvd., Dallas, Texas
- Coordinates: 32°44′36″N 96°49′37″W
- Area: less than one acre
- Built: 1929
- Built by: Arthur J. Rife
- Architectural style: Art Deco
- MPS: Oak Cliff MPS
- NRHP reference No.: 00001537
- Added to NRHP: December 13, 2000

The Medical Dental Building, located in Dallas, Texas, is listed on the National Register of Historic Places. Built in 1928 in the Art Deco/Art Moderne style, the nine-story low-rise was originally known as the Jefferson Building.

== See also ==
- National Register of Historic Places listings in Dallas County, Texas
