= Central Congregational Church (Dallas) =

Historic church in Texas, United States

- U.S. National Register of Historic Places
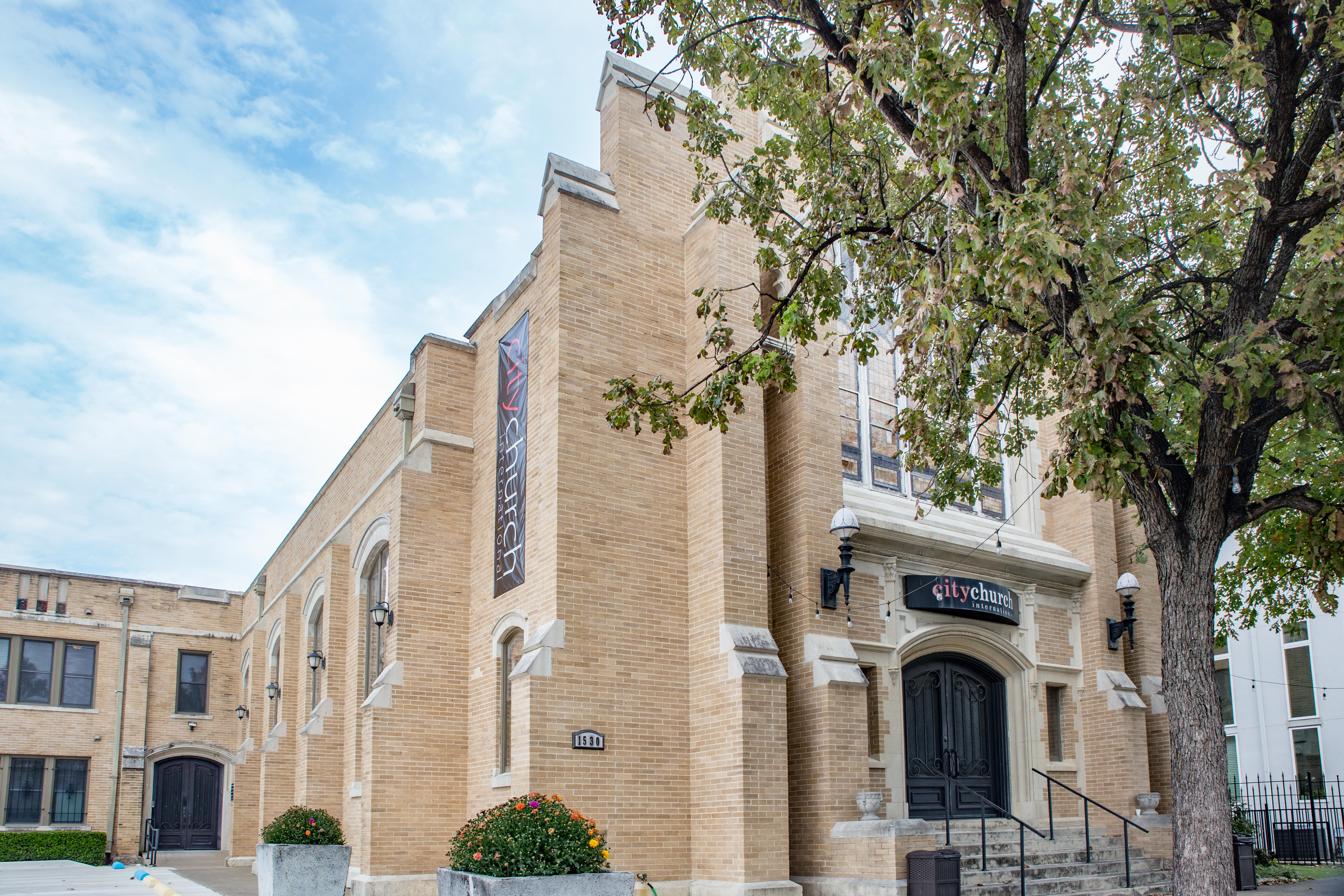
- Central Congregational Church in 2022

- Location within Texas Location within the United States
- Location: 1530 N. Carroll, Dallas, Texas
- Coordinates: 32°48′7″N 96°46′43″W
- Area: less than one acre
- Built: 1920
- Architectural style: Late Gothic Revival
- Website: City Church International
- MPS: East and South Dallas MPS
- NRHP reference No.: 95000307
- Added to NRHP: March 23, 1995

Central Congregational Church (now known as City Church International) is a historic church building in Dallas, Texas.

The late Gothic Revival church building was constructed in 1920 for the Central Congregational Church congregation before it moved to another location. The building was added to the National Register of Historic Places in 1995. The building is now home to City Church International.

== See also ==
- National Register of Historic Places listings in Dallas County, Texas
