= Everard Sharrock Jr. Farm =

Historic site in Dallas, Texas

The Everard Sharrock, Jr. Farm (also known as Sharrock–Niblo Farmstead) is a historic farm at 6900 Grady Niblo Road in Dallas, Texas. It contains possibly the oldest surviving buildings in the city. The farm was added to the National Register of Historic Places in 2015 as #15000877. The farm is also a Texas Historic Landmark. Everard Sharrock, Jr. built the log cabin on his 640-acre farm. The building's history is documented from the time of the Peters Colony settlement. The log cabin, hand-dug well, log barn, and root cellar date to 1847. The frame farm house dates to 1872. Irish immigrant Thomas Jefferson Young (1799–1875) acquired the property from Sharrock in 1853. Thomas Young's son, Andrew Alexander Young, received the property from his father in 1867 and sold it in 1881 to the H.K. Hale family. The City of Dallas acquired the property in the early 21st century to preserve the original farm buildings.

== See also ==
- List of the oldest buildings in Texas
