= Central Congregational Church (Galesburg) =

Historic church in Illinois, United States

- Meetinghouse of the Central Congregational Church
- U.S. National Register of Historic Places
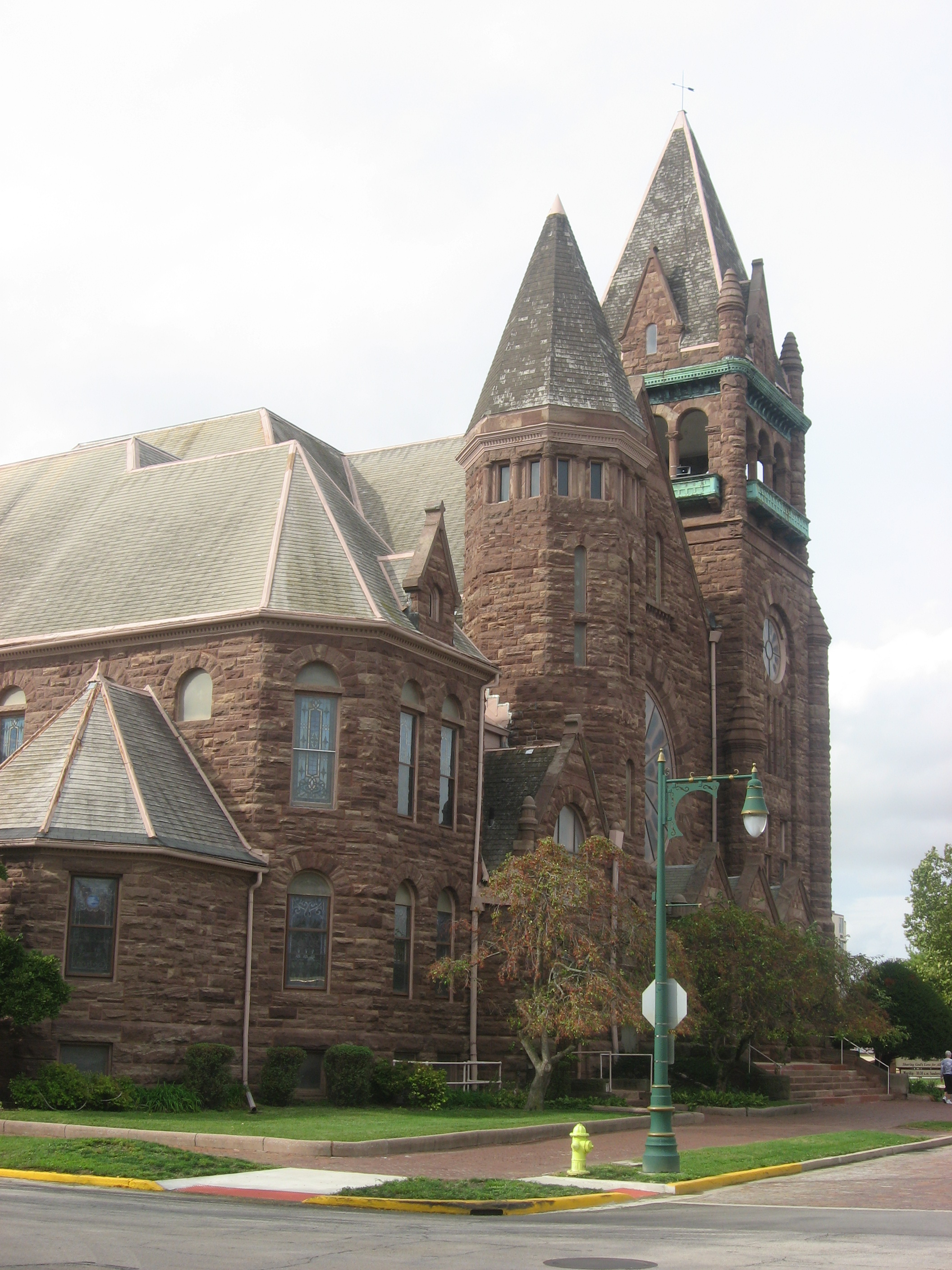
- Front of the church

- Location within Illinois Location within the United States
- Location: Central Sq., Galesburg, Illinois
- Coordinates: 40°56′49″N 90°22′15″W
- Area: less than one acre
- Built: 1897–98
- Architect: C.E. Gottschalk
- Architectural style: Romanesque, Richardsonian Romanesque
- NRHP reference No.: 76000716
- Added to NRHP: September 30, 1976

The Central Congregational Church is a historic church on Central Square in Galesburg, Illinois. The church was built from 1897 to 1898 to serve Galesburg's newly united Congregational church. Galesburg's two congregational churches formed in the 1850s after separating from the town's Presbyterian church; the two churches united in 1895 after one church began to collapse during a service. Galesburg architect C.E. Gottschalk designed the church in the Richardsonian Romanesque style; his design features a bell tower with a pyramidal roof, numerous turrets, a 22-foot (6.7 m) wide stained glass rose window above the entrance, and detailed stonework. The brown sandstone used to construct the church was imported from Marquette, Michigan. The church's bell was formed from the bells used in the two Congregational churches before their union. In 1912, the church acquired an organ built by the M. P. Moller Company.

The church was added to the National Register of Historic Places on September 30, 1976.
