= National Register of Historic Places listings in the Metroplex region of Texas: Dallas and Tarrant counties =

This page is one of two listing the National Register of Historic Places listings in Texas' Metroplex.

The Metroplex region is an area of 19 counties defined by the Texas Comptroller for economic reporting, as mapped here. It includes all of the Dallas-Fort Worth metroplex by most definitions; the U.S. Office of Management and Budget-defined statistical area of Dallas–Fort Worth–Arlington includes just 11 counties. (Note: The OMB-defined Dallas–Fort Worth–Arlington statistical area omits three counties to the north (Cooke, Fannin, Grayson) and five to the southwest (Erath, Hood, Palo Pinto, Parker, Somervell).) The region included 2020 population of more than 8 million, or 27.6 percent of Texas' population, with the Dallas-Fort Worth-Arlington MSA having 94.9 percent of the Metroplex's population.

Due to size limitations, the tables of National Register listings for all counties in the Metroplex region cannot be shown. This shows just listings in the center two counties, Dallas and Tarrant (Fort Worth). For the rest, see National Register of Historic Places listings in the Metroplex region of Texas: Other

To see all locations together in a map, click on "Map all coordinates using OpenSourceMap" at right.

== Dallas County ==
	Name on the Register	Image	Date listed	Location	City or town	Description
1	511 Akard Building	511 Akard Building	March 31, 2014 (#14000103)	511 N. Akard; 32°47′03″N 96°48′02″W	Dallas	
2	1926 Republic National Bank	1926 Republic National Bank	January 18, 2006 (#05001543)	1309 Main St. 32°46′56″N 96°48′03″W	Dallas	Part of Dallas Downtown Historic District
3	4928 Bryan Street Apartments	4928 Bryan Street Apartments	March 23, 1995 (#08000539)	4928 Bryan Street; 32°48′16″N 96°46′20″W	Dallas	Historic Resources of East and South Dallas MPS
4	W.H. Adamson High School	W.H. Adamson High School	June 8, 2011 (#11000343)	201 E. 9th St. 32°44′52″N 96°49′19″W	Dallas	
5	Alcalde Street-Crockett School Historic District	Alcalde Street-Crockett School Historic District	March 23, 1995 (#95000330)	200-500 Alcalde, 421-421A N. Carroll and 4315 Victor; 32°47′33″N 96°46′12″W	Dallas	Historic Resources of East and South Dallas MPS
6	Ambassador Hotel	Ambassador Hotel	April 4, 2019 (#100003599)	1300 S. Ervay; 32°46′22″N 96°47′26″W	Dallas	Destroyed by fire May 28, 2019.
7	D. M. Angle House	D. M. Angle House	March 27, 1985 (#85000710)	800 Beltline; 32°35′22″N 96°57′30″W	Cedar Hill	Historic Resources of Cedar Hill MRA
8	Bella Villa Apartments	Bella Villa Apartments	September 12, 2019 (#100004371)	5506 Miller Ave; 32°49′16″N 96°46′28″W	Dallas	
9	Alfred Horatio Belo House	Alfred Horatio Belo House	October 29, 1975 (#75001965)	2115 Ross Ave. 32°47′18″N 96°47′55″W	Dallas	Recorded Texas Historic Landmark
10	Didaco and Ida Bianchi House	Didaco and Ida Bianchi House	March 23, 1995 (#95000311)	4503 Reiger Ave. 32°47′35″N 96°46′07″W	Dallas	Historic Resources of East and South Dallas MPS
11	Bluitt Sanitarium	Bluitt Sanitarium	July 26, 2006 (#06000651)	2036 Commerce St. 32°46′58″N 96°47′33″W	Dallas	Part of Dallas Downtown Historic District
12	Braniff International Hostess College	Braniff International Hostess College	March 2, 2021 (#100006219)	2801 Wycliff Ave. 32°48′44″N 96°49′01″W	Dallas	
13	Alfred and Juantia Bromberg House	Alfred and Juantia Bromberg House	July 8, 2008 (#08000658)	3201 Wendover Road; 32°49′29″N 96°44′35″W	Dallas	
14	Bryan Tower	Bryan Tower	August 14, 2024 (#100009495)	2001 Bryan St. 32°47′07″N 96°47′47″W	Dallas	
15	Bryan-Peak Commercial Historic District	Bryan-Peak Commercial Historic District	March 23, 1995 (#95000327)	4214-4311 Bryan Ave. and 1325-1408 N. Peak; 32°47′51″N 96°46′45″W	Dallas	Historic Resources of East and South Dallas MPS
16	William Bryant Jr. House	William Bryant Jr. House	March 27, 1985 (#85000711)	S. Broad and Cooper; 32°35′09″N 96°57′25″W	Cedar Hill	Historic Resources of Cedar Hill MRA
17	Building at 3525 Turtle Creek Boulevard	Building at 3525 Turtle Creek Boulevard	May 29, 2008 (#08000475)	3525 Turtle Creek Boulevard; 32°48′40″N 96°48′11″W	Dallas	
18	Busch-Kirby Building	Busch-Kirby Building	July 4, 1980 (#80004489)	1501-1509 Main St. 32°46′49″N 96°47′56″W	Dallas	Recorded Texas Historic Landmark; part of Dallas Downtown Historic District; originally listed as Busch Building before boundary increase of September 12, 1996.
19	Cabana Motor Hotel	Cabana Motor Hotel	May 8, 2019 (#100003923)	899 N. Stemmons Frwy. 32°47′10″N 96°48′48″W	Dallas	
20	Cedar Springs Place	Cedar Springs Place	December 30, 1991 (#91001901)	2531 Lucas Dr. 32°48′50″N 96°49′14″W	Dallas	
21	Central Congregational Church	Central Congregational Church	March 23, 1995 (#95000307)	1530 N. Carroll; 32°48′07″N 96°46′43″W	Dallas	Historic Resources of East and South Dallas MPS
22	Chevrolet Motor Company Building	Chevrolet Motor Company Building	April 18, 2003 (#03000277)	3221 Commerce; 32°47′04″N 96°46′36″W	Dallas	
23	Claremont Apartments	Claremont Apartments	March 23, 1995 (#95000313)	4636 Ross Ave. 32°48′17″N 96°46′37″W	Dallas	Historic Resources of East and South Dallas MPS; demolished
24	Clements Hall	Clements Hall	September 27, 1980 (#80004087)	3200 Dyer St. 32°50′36″N 96°47′03″W	University Park	Georgian Revival Buildings of Southern Methodist University TR
25	Colonial Hill Historic District	Colonial Hill Historic District	March 23, 1995 (#95000334)	Bounded by Pennsylvania Ave., I-45, US 75 and Hatcher; 32°45′04″N 96°45′58″W	Dallas	Historic Resources of East and South Dallas MPS
26	Continental Gin Company	Continental Gin Company	February 14, 1983 (#83003134)	3301-3333 Elm St., 212 and 232 Trunk Ave. 32°47′10″N 96°46′37″W	Dallas	
27	Dallas Coffin Company	Dallas Coffin Company	June 15, 2012 (#12000350)	1325 S. Lamar; 32°46′04″N 96°47′46″W	Dallas	
28	Dallas County Courthouse	Dallas County Courthouse	December 12, 1976 (#76002019)	Houston and Commerce Sts. 32°46′45″N 96°48′25″W	Dallas	State Antiquities Landmark, Recorded Texas Historic Landmark; part of Dealey Plaza Historic District, Westend Historic District
29	Dallas Downtown Historic District	Dallas Downtown Historic District	August 11, 2006 (#04000894)	Roughly bounded by Federal, N. St. Paul, Pacific, Harwood, S. Pearl, Commerce, S, Ervay, Akard, Commerce, and Field; also bounded by Jackson, North Hardwood Commerce, the north-south line between S. Pearl Expressway, and S. Hardwood Canton; 32°46′57″N 96°47′51″W	Dallas	Includes State Antiquities Landmark, Recorded Texas Historic Landmarks; a boundary increase was approved January 9, 2009.
30	Dallas Fire Station No. 16	Dallas Fire Station No. 16	April 17, 1997 (#97000363)	5501 Columbia Ave. 32°47′56″N 96°45′18″W	Dallas	
31	Dallas Hall	Dallas Hall	November 17, 1978 (#78002913)	Southern Methodist University campus 32°50′42″N 96°47′05″W	University Park	Recorded Texas Historic Landmark; Georgian Revival Buildings of Southern Methodist University TR
32	Dallas High School Historic District	Dallas High School Historic District	February 20, 1996 (#96000035)	2218 Bryan St. 32°47′10″N 96°47′36″W	Dallas	
33	Dallas National Bank	Dallas National Bank	May 10, 2005 (#05000419)	1530 Main and 1511 Commerce St. 32°46′56″N 96°47′54″W	Dallas	Part of Dallas Downtown Historic District
34	Dallas Scottish Rite Temple	Dallas Scottish Rite Temple	March 26, 1980 (#80004088)	Harwood and Young Sts. 32°46′43″N 96°47′31″W	Dallas	Recorded Texas Historic Landmark; part of Dallas Downtown Historic District
35	Dallas Tent and Awning Building	Dallas Tent and Awning Building	October 28, 1999 (#99001292)	3401 Commerce St. 32°47′06″N 96°46′28″W	Dallas	
36	Dallas Times Herald Pasadena Perfect Home	Dallas Times Herald Pasadena Perfect Home	September 13, 2006 (#06000819)	6938 Wildgrove Ave. 32°49′08″N 96°44′15″W	Dallas	
37	Dallas Union Terminal	Dallas Union Terminal	May 29, 1975 (#75001966)	400 S. Houston St. 32°46′32″N 96°48′27″W	Dallas	Recorded Texas Historic Landmark
38	Dealey Plaza Historic District	Dealey Plaza Historic District	April 19, 1993 (#93001607)	Roughly bounded by Pacific Ave., Market St., Jackson St. and right of way of Dallas Right of Way Management Company; 32°46′42″N 96°48′26″W	Dallas	Includes State Antiquities Landmark, Recorded Texas Historic Landmarks
39	DeGolyer Estate	DeGolyer Estate	December 28, 1978 (#78002914)	8525 Garland Rd. 32°49′17″N 96°43′03″W	Dallas	State Antiquities Landmark, Recorded Texas Historic Landmark
40	Deep Ellum Historic District	Deep Ellum Historic District	June 30, 2023 (#100009082)	Roughly bounded by Dallas Area Rapid Transit (DART) alignment and Elm St., South Hall St., North Central Expy., and E.R.L. Thornton Fwy. (I 30); 32°47′01″N 96°46′55″W	Dallas	
41	Dixon-Moore House		March 23, 1995 (#95000320)	2716 Peabody; 32°48′07″N 96°46′43″W	Dallas	Historic Resources of East and South Dallas MPS; demolished
42	James H. and Molly Ellis House	James H. and Molly Ellis House	March 23, 1995 (#95000323)	2426 Pine, until destruction by fire in 2019; 32°45′17″N 96°45′42″W	Dallas	Historic Resources of East and South Dallas MPS; demolished
43	Emanuel Lutheran Church	Emanuel Lutheran Church	March 23, 1995 (#95000315)	4301 San Jacinto; 32°48′02″N 96°46′51″W	Dallas	Historic Resources of East and South Dallas MPS
44	James W. Fannin Elementary School	James W. Fannin Elementary School	March 23, 1995 (#95000314)	4800 Ross Ave. 32°48′19″N 96°46′32″W	Dallas	Historic Resources of East and South Dallas MPS
45	Fidelity Union Life Insurance Building	Fidelity Union Life Insurance Building	September 29, 2009 (#09000306)	1511 Bryan and 1507 Pacific Ave. 32°46′57″N 96°47′59″W	Dallas	
46	First National Bank Tower	First National Bank Tower	October 23, 2017 (#100001764)	1401 Elm St. 32°46′54″N 96°48′02″W	Dallas	
47	Fred Florence Hall	Fred Florence Hall	September 27, 1980 (#80004089)	3330 University Blvd. 32°50′43″N 96°47′10″W	University Park	Georgian Revival Buildings of Southern Methodist University TR
48	Forest Theatre	Forest Theatre	December 4, 2019 (#100004752)	1904 Martin Luther King Jr. Blvd. 32°45′50″N 96°46′28″W	Dallas	
49	Old Forest Avenue High School	Old Forest Avenue High School	March 23, 1995 (#95000318)	3000 Martin Luther King, Jr., Blvd. 32°46′16″N 96°45′53″W	Dallas	Historic Resources of East and South Dallas MPS
50	G & J Manufacturing	G & J Manufacturing	September 14, 2002 (#02000992)	3912 Willow St. 32°47′08″N 96°46′13″W	Dallas	
51	Garland Bank & Trust Company	Garland Bank & Trust Company	January 20, 2023 (#100008552)	111 South Garland Ave. 32°54′43″N 96°38′55″W	Garland	
52	Garland Downtown Historic District	Garland Downtown Historic District	April 10, 2017 (#100000861)	Roughly bounded by W. State St., Santa Fe rail line, W. Ave. A & Glenbrook Dr. 32°54′46″N 96°38′20″W	Garland	A boundary increase was approved July 24, 2017.
53	Samuel and Julia Gilbert House	Samuel and Julia Gilbert House	November 10, 1988 (#88002063)	2540 Farmers Branch Ln. 32°55′05″N 96°53′26″W	Farmers Branch	Recorded Texas Historic Landmark
54	Goodyear Tire and Rubber Company Building and B.F. Goodrich Building	Goodyear Tire and Rubber Company Building and B.F. Goodrich Building	February 19, 2002 (#02000009)	2809 Parry Ave. and 4136-40 Commerce St. 32°46′29″N 96°45′56″W	Dallas	
55	Gospel Lighthouse Church	Gospel Lighthouse Church	February 9, 2022 (#100007423)	1900 South Ewing Ave. 32°43′29″N 96°48′39″W	Dallas	
56	Grace Methodist Episcopal Church	Grace Methodist Episcopal Church	November 4, 1982 (#82001736)	4105 Junius St. 32°47′36″N 96°46′32″W	Dallas	Part of Peak's Suburban Addition Historic District
57	Grand Lodge of the Colored Knights of Pythias, Texas	Grand Lodge of the Colored Knights of Pythias, Texas	February 17, 2017 (#100000671)	2551 Elm St. 32°47′03″N 96°47′14″W	Dallas	
58	Greenway Parks Historic District	Greenway Parks Historic District	January 10, 2008 (#07001383)	Bounded by W. Mockingbird Ln., W. University Blvd., Inwood & N. Dallas Tollway. 32°50′27″N 96°49′04″W	Dallas	Historic Residential Suburbs in the United States, 1830-1960 MPS
59	George C. Greer House	George C. Greer House	January 9, 1997 (#96001563)	5439 Swiss Ave. 32°48′23″N 96°45′53″W	Dallas	Part of Swiss Avenue Historic District
60	Gulf Oil Distribution Facility	Gulf Oil Distribution Facility	March 31, 2010 (#10000144)	501 S. 2nd St. 32°46′56″N 96°46′22″W	Dallas	
61	Harlan Building	Harlan Building	February 26, 2004 (#04000102)	2018 Cadiz St. 32°46′49″N 96°47′28″W	Dallas	
62	Z. T. (Tip) Hawkes House	Z. T. (Tip) Hawkes House	March 27, 1985 (#85000712)	132 N. Potter St. 32°35′28″N 96°57′33″W	Cedar Hill	Historic Resources of Cedar Hill MRA
63	Highland Park Shopping Village	Highland Park Shopping Village	November 17, 1997 (#97001393)	Jct. of Preston Rd. and Mockingbird Ln. 32°50′08″N 96°48′18″W	Highland Park	
64	Hilton Hotel	Hilton Hotel	December 5, 1985 (#85003092)	1933 Main St. 32°46′54″N 96°47′39″W	Dallas	Recorded Texas Historic Landmark; part of Dallas Downtown Historic District
65	Hotel Adolphus	Hotel Adolphus	July 14, 1983 (#83003133)	1315 Commerce St. 32°46′47″N 96°47′57″W	Dallas	Recorded Texas Historic Landmark; part of Dallas Downtown Historic District
66	Houston Street Viaduct	Houston Street Viaduct	August 9, 1984 (#84001641)	Houston St. roughly between Arlington St. and Lancaster Ave. 32°46′12″N 96°48′31″W	Dallas	
67	Hughes Brothers Manufacturing Company Building	Hughes Brothers Manufacturing Company Building	December 27, 2016 (#16000915)	1401 S. Ervay St. 32°46′20″N 96°47′25″W	Dallas	
68	Hyer Hall	Hyer Hall	September 27, 1980 (#80004090)	6424 Hill Lane; 32°50′41″N 96°47′02″W	University Park	Georgian Revival Buildings of Southern Methodist University TR
69	Interstate Forwarding Company Warehouse	Interstate Forwarding Company Warehouse	February 14, 1992 (#92000021)	3200 Main St. 32°47′05″N 96°46′37″W	Dallas	Recorded Texas Historic Landmark
70	Joffre-Gilbert House	Joffre-Gilbert House	August 1, 2014 (#14000473)	309 South O'Connor Road; 32°48′41″N 96°57′01″W	Irving	Recorded Texas Historic Landmark
71	Johnson Rooming House	Johnson Rooming House	November 26, 2014 (#14000962)	1026 N. Beckley Avenue; 32°45′32″N 96°49′21″W	Dallas	
72	Kessler Park Historic District	Kessler Park Historic District	June 17, 1994 (#94000607)	Roughly bounded by Kidd Springs, Stewart, Oak Cliff, Plymouth, I-30, Turner, Colorado, and Sylvan; 32°45′25″N 96°50′39″W	Dallas	Historic and Architectural Resources of Oak Cliff MPS; a boundary increase was approved September 7, 1995.
73	King's Highway Historic District	King's Highway Historic District	June 17, 1994 (#94000606)	900-1500 Blocks of King's Highway between W. Davis St. and Montclair Ave. 32°45′07″N 96°50′32″W	Dallas	Historic and Architectural Resources of Oak Cliff MPS
74	Lake Cliff Historic District	Lake Cliff Historic District	June 17, 1994 (#94000609)	Roughly bounded by E. 6th St., Beckley Ave., Zangs Blvd. and Marsalis Ave. 32°45′23″N 96°49′06″W	Dallas	Historic and Architectural Resources of Oak Cliff MPS
75	Lamar-McKinney Bridge	Lamar-McKinney Bridge	October 5, 2015 (#15000708)	Across Trinity River at Continental Avenue; 32°46′52″N 96°49′20″W	Dallas	
76	Lancaster Avenue Commercial Historic District	Lancaster Avenue Commercial Historic District	June 17, 1994 (#94000605)	Roughly bounded by E. Jefferson Blvd., S. Marsalis, E. 10th St., E. 9th St. and N. Lancaster Ave. 32°44′54″N 96°48′53″W	Dallas	Historic and Architectural Resources of Oak Cliff MPS
77	Stephen Decatur Lawrence Farmstead	Stephen Decatur Lawrence Farmstead	September 9, 1999 (#99001139)	701 E. Kearney St. 32°46′13″N 96°35′20″W	Mesquite	Recorded Texas Historic Landmark
78	Mark and Maybelle Lemmon House	Mark and Maybelle Lemmon House	June 15, 2006 (#06000513)	3211 Mockingbird Ln. 32°50′17″N 96°47′04″W	Highland Park	Recorded Texas Historic Landmark
79	Levi-Moses House	Levi-Moses House	March 23, 1995 (#95000316)	2433 Martin Luther King, Jr., Blvd. 32°45′56″N 96°46′20″W	Dallas	Historic Resources of East and South Dallas MPS
80	Levi-Topletz House	Levi-Topletz House	March 23, 1995 (#95000317)	2603 Martin Luther King, Jr., Blvd. 32°46′02″N 96°46′13″W	Dallas	Historic Resources of East and South Dallas MPS
81	Lincoln Paint and Color Company Building	Lincoln Paint and Color Company Building	July 11, 2002 (#02000730)	3210 Main; 32°47′06″N 96°46′36″W	Dallas	
82	Longhorn Ballroom	Longhorn Ballroom	February 1, 2024 (#100009894)	200 Corinth Street; 32°45′37″N 96°47′36″W	Dallas	
83	Magnolia Building	Magnolia Building	January 30, 1978 (#78002915)	108 S. Akard St. 32°46′48″N 96°47′56″W	Dallas	Recorded Texas Historic Landmark; part of Dallas Downtown Historic District
84	Magnolia Petroleum Company City Sales and Warehouse	Magnolia Petroleum Company City Sales and Warehouse	December 23, 1994 (#94001473)	1607 Lyte St. 32°47′33″N 96°48′37″W	Dallas	
85	Majestic Theatre	Majestic Theatre	November 14, 1977 (#77001437)	1925 Elm St. 32°47′01″N 96°47′40″W	Dallas	State Antiquities Landmark, Recorded Texas Historic Landmark; part of Dallas Downtown Historic District
86	Mary Apartments	Mary Apartments	March 23, 1995 (#95000310)	4524 Live Oak; 32°47′58″N 96°46′30″W	Dallas	Historic Resources of East and South Dallas MPS-Demolished
87	Mayflower Building	Mayflower Building	January 27, 2015 (#14001227)	411 North Akard Street; 32°46′59″N 96°48′03″W	Dallas	
88	McFarlin Memorial Auditorium	McFarlin Memorial Auditorium	September 27, 1980 (#80004091)	6405 Hillcrest Rd. 32°50′38″N 96°47′10″W	University Park	Georgian Revival Buildings of Southern Methodist University TR
89	McGaugh Hosiery Mills - Airmaid Mills Building	McGaugh Hosiery Mills - Airmaid Mills Building	August 8, 2019 (#100004249)	4408 2nd Ave. 32°45′52″N 96°44′52″W	Dallas	
90	Roger D. McIntosh House	Roger D. McIntosh House	April 7, 1983 (#83003135)	1518 Abrams Rd. 32°48′25″N 96°45′13″W	Dallas	
91	Medical Dental Building	Medical Dental Building	December 13, 2000 (#00001537)	300 Blk. of West Jefferson Blvd. 32°44′36″N 96°49′37″W	Dallas	Historic and Architectural Resources of Oak Cliff MPS
92	Miller and Stemmons Historic District	Miller and Stemmons Historic District	June 17, 1994 (#94000611)	Roughly bounded by W. Davis St., Woodlawn Ave., Neches and Elsbeth; 32°45′09″N 96°49′39″W	Dallas	Historic and Architectural Resources of Oak Cliff MPS
93	John Hickman Miller House	John Hickman Miller House	May 23, 1980 (#80004092)	3506 Cedar Springs; 32°48′24″N 96°48′20″W	Dallas	Recorded Texas Historic Landmark
94	John E. Mitchell Company Plant	John E. Mitchell Company Plant	March 4, 1991 (#91000118)	3800 Commerce St. 32°47′05″N 96°46′16″W	Dallas	
95	Monroe Shops	Monroe Shops	March 7, 2007 (#07000130)	2111 S. Corinth St. 32°43′27″N 96°48′15″W	Dallas	
96	Mrs. Baird's Bread Company Building	Mrs. Baird's Bread Company Building	March 23, 1995 (#95000309)	1401 N. Carroll; 32°48′01″N 96°46′36″W	Dallas	Historic Resources of East and South Dallas MPS
97	Munger Place Historic District	Munger Place Historic District	September 13, 1978 (#78002916)	Roughly bounded by Henderson, Junius, Prairie, and Reiger Sts. 32°47′58″N 96°45′51″W	Dallas	
98	North Bishop Avenue Commercial Historic District	North Bishop Avenue Commercial Historic District	June 17, 1994 (#94000608)	Roughly bounded by 9th St., Davis St., Adams and Madison; 32°44′50″N 96°49′42″W	Dallas	Historic and Architectural Resources of Oak Cliff MPS
99	Number 4 Hook and Ladder Company	Number 4 Hook and Ladder Company	May 4, 1981 (#81000627)	Cedar Springs Rd. and Reagan St. 32°48′35″N 96°48′32″W	Dallas	
100	Oak Lawn Methodist Episcopal Church, South	Oak Lawn Methodist Episcopal Church, South	March 16, 1988 (#88000176)	3014 Oak Lawn Ave. 32°48′33″N 96°48′29″W	Dallas	
101	One Main Place	One Main Place	May 15, 2015 (#15000245)	1201 Main Street; 32°46′50″N 96°48′07″W	Dallas	
102	Paine House	Paine House	November 26, 2014 (#14000963)	2515 West 5th Street; 32°48′35″N 96°58′46″W	Irving	Location where Lee Harvey Oswald stayed the night before the assassination of President John F. Kennedy.
103	Parkland Hospital	Parkland Hospital	October 25, 2011 (#10000249)	3819 Maple Avenue; 32°48′15″N 96°48′56″W	Dallas	Original Parkland Hospital building
104	Stanley Patterson Hall	Stanley Patterson Hall	September 27, 1980 (#80004094)	3128 Dyer St. 32°50′36″N 96°46′56″W	University Park	Georgian Revival Buildings of Southern Methodist University TR
105	Peak's Suburban Addition Historic District	Peak's Suburban Addition Historic District	March 23, 1995 (#95000328)	Roughly bounded by Sycamore, Peak, Worth and Fitzhugh; 32°47′44″N 96°46′24″W	Dallas	Historic Resources of East and South Dallas MPS
106	Perkins Hall of Administration	Perkins Hall of Administration	September 27, 1980 (#80004095)	6425 Hillcrest Rd. 32°50′41″N 96°47′09″W	University Park	Georgian Revival Buildings of Southern Methodist University TR
107	Purvin-Hexter Building	Purvin-Hexter Building	January 18, 2006 (#05001541)	2038 Commerce St. 32°46′58″N 96°47′35″W	Dallas	Part of Dallas Downtown Historic District
108	Queen City Heights Historic District	Queen City Heights Historic District	March 23, 1995 (#95000332)	Roughly bounded by Eugene, Cooper, Latimer, Kynard and Dildock; 32°45′36″N 96°45′47″W	Dallas	Historic Resources of East and South Dallas MPS
109	Randlett House	Randlett House	August 11, 1978 (#78002920)	401 S. Centre St. 32°35′26″N 96°45′20″W	Lancaster	
110	Capt. R. A. Rawlins House	Capt. R. A. Rawlins House	November 15, 1978 (#78002921)	2219 Dowling St. 32°34′49″N 96°45′22″W	Lancaster	Recorded Texas Historic Landmark
111	Republic National Bank	Republic National Bank	March 31, 2005 (#05000243)	300 N. Ervay/325 N. St. Paul St. 32°47′06″N 96°47′51″W	Dallas	Part of Dallas Downtown Historic District
112	Dr. Rufus A. Roberts House	Dr. Rufus A. Roberts House	March 27, 1985 (#85000713)	210 S. Broad St. 32°35′17″N 96°57′26″W	Cedar Hill	Recorded Texas Historic Landmark; Historic Resources of Cedar Hill MRA
113	Romine Avenue Historic District	Romine Avenue Historic District	March 23, 1995 (#95000333)	2300-2400 blocks of Romine Ave., N side 32°45′32″N 96°45′54″W	Dallas	Historic Resources of East and South Dallas MPS
114	Rosemont Crest Historic District	Rosemont Crest Historic District	June 17, 1994 (#94000610)	Roughly bounded by 10th St., Oak Cliff Blvd., W. Davis St., N. Brighton Ave., W. 8th St. and Rosemont Ave. 32°44′48″N 96°51′02″W	Dallas	Historic and Architectural Resources of Oak Cliff MPS
115	Max J. and Jennie Rosenfield House	Max J. and Jennie Rosenfield House	April 21, 2025 (#100011754)	1419 Beaumont Street; 32°46′08″N 96°47′21″W	Dallas	
116	Rush-Crabb House	Rush-Crabb House	March 23, 1995 (#95000321)	2718 Pennsylvania; 32°46′02″N 96°46′02″W	Dallas	Historic Resources of East and South Dallas MPS
117	Sanger Brothers Complex	Sanger Brothers Complex	April 8, 1975 (#75001967)	Block 32, bounded by Elm, Lamar, Main and Austin Sts. 32°46′47″N 96°48′15″W	Dallas	Part of Westend Historic District
118	Santa Fe Terminal Buildings No. 1 and No. 2	Santa Fe Terminal Buildings No. 1 and No. 2	May 23, 1997 (#97000478)	1114 Commerce St. and 1118 Jackson St. 32°47′48″N 96°48′03″W	Dallas	
119	Santa Fe Terminal Building No. 4	Santa Fe Terminal Building No. 4	June 8, 2011 (#11000344)	1033 Young St. 32°46′37″N 96°48′04″W	Dallas	
120	Everard Sharrock Jr. Farm	Everard Sharrock Jr. Farm	December 8, 2015 (#15000877)	6900 Grady Niblo Rd. 32°41′02″N 96°56′23″W	Dallas	Recorded Texas Historic Landmark
121	Thomas Shiels House	Thomas Shiels House	March 23, 1995 (#95000312)	4602 Reiger Ave. 32°47′37″N 96°46′02″W	Dallas	Historic Resources of East and South Dallas MPS
122	Ascher Silberstein School	Ascher Silberstein School	March 23, 1995 (#95000325)	2425 Pine St. 32°45′21″N 96°45′40″W	Dallas	Historic Resources of East and South Dallas MPS
123	Snider Hall	Snider Hall	September 27, 1980 (#80004096)	3305 Dyer St. 32°50′33″N 96°47′09″W	University Park	Georgian Revival Buildings of Southern Methodist University TR
124	South Boulevard–Park Row Historic District	South Boulevard–Park Row Historic District	February 5, 1979 (#79002930)	South Blvd. and Park Row from Central; 32°46′05″N 96°46′20″W	Dallas	
125	Jacob and Eliza Spake House	Jacob and Eliza Spake House	November 21, 1985 (#85002912)	2600 State St. 32°47′43″N 96°47′58″W	Dallas	
126	St. Paul Methodist Episcopal Church	St. Paul Methodist Episcopal Church	December 27, 2016 (#16000916)	1816 Routh St. 32°47′32″N 96°47′47″W	Dallas	Recorded Texas Historic Landmark
127	Stanard-Tilton Flour Mill	Stanard-Tilton Flour Mill	October 6, 1997 (#97001187)	2400 S. Ervay St. 32°46′00″N 96°46′55″W	Dallas	
128	Stoneleigh Court Hotel	Stoneleigh Court Hotel	September 18, 2007 (#07000989)	2927 Maple Ave. 32°47′51″N 96°48′25″W	Dallas	
129	Strain Farm-W.A. Strain House	Strain Farm-W.A. Strain House	November 29, 1978 (#78002922)	400 E. Pecan St., 400 Lancaster-Hutchins Rd. 32°35′16″N 96°44′58″W	Lancaster	Includes State Antiquities Landmarks, Recorded Texas Historic Landmark; a boundary increase was approved September 17, 2001.
130	Straus House	Straus House	July 12, 1985 (#85001495)	400 Cedar; 32°35′18″N 96°57′15″W	Cedar Hill	Historic Resources of Cedar Hill MRA
131	Swiss Avenue Historic District	Swiss Avenue Historic District	March 28, 1974 (#74002068)	Swiss Ave. between Fitzhugh and LaVista; 32°48′25″N 96°45′49″W	Dallas	Includes Recorded Texas Historic Landmarks
132	Tenth Street Historic District	Tenth Street Historic District	June 17, 1994 (#94000604)	Roughly bounded by E. Clarendon Dr., S. Fleming Ave., I-35E, E. 8th St. and the E end of Church, E. 9th and Plum Sts. 32°44′52″N 96°48′23″W	Dallas	Historic and Architectural Resources of Oak Cliff MPS
133	Texas Centennial Exposition Buildings (1936-1937)	Texas Centennial Exposition Buildings (1936-1937)	September 24, 1986 (#86003488)	Bounded by Texas and Pacific RR, Pennsylvania, Second, and Parry Aves. 32°46′46″N 96°45′35″W	Dallas	Includes State Antiquities Landmarks, Recorded Texas Historic Landmarks
134	Texas Farm and Ranch Building	Texas Farm and Ranch Building	December 9, 1999 (#99001499)	3300 Main St. 32°47′07″N 96°46′31″W	Dallas	
135	Texas Theatre	Texas Theatre	April 1, 2003 (#03000187)	231 W. Jefferson Blvd. 32°44′36″N 96°49′32″W	Dallas	Historic and Architectural Resources of Oak Cliff MPS
136	Titche-Goettinger Building	Titche-Goettinger Building	May 24, 1996 (#96000586)	1901 Main St. 32°47′26″N 96°47′42″W	Dallas	Part of Dallas Downtown Historic District
137	Travis College Hill Historic District	Travis College Hill Historic District	February 17, 2017 (#100000672)	300-400 blocks S. 11th St. 32°54′36″N 96°38′36″W	Garland	
138	Trinity English Lutheran Church	Trinity English Lutheran Church	March 23, 1995 (#95000319)	3100 Martin Luther King, Jr., Blvd. 32°46′19″N 96°45′52″W	Dallas	Historic Resources of East and South Dallas MPS
139	Turtle Creek Pump Station	Turtle Creek Pump Station	February 9, 2001 (#01000103)	3630 Harry Hines Blvd. 32°48′00″N 96°48′59″W	Dallas	State Antiquities Landmark, Recorded Texas Historic Landmark
140	U.S. Courthouse and Federal Office Building	U.S. Courthouse and Federal Office Building	November 14, 2023 (#100009557)	1100 Commerce Street; 32°48′04″N 96°46′15″W	Dallas	The Earle Cabell Federal Building and Courthouse.
141	Viola Courts Apartments	Viola Courts Apartments	January 19, 1984 (#84001643)	4845 Swiss Ave. 32°48′04″N 96°46′15″W	Dallas	Part of Peak's Suburban Addition Historic District
142	Virginia Hall	Virginia Hall	September 27, 1980 (#80004097)	3325 Dyer St. 32°50′34″N 96°47′11″W	University Park	Georgian Revival Buildings of Southern Methodist University TR
143	Waples-Platter Buildings	Waples-Platter Buildings	March 24, 1978 (#78002917)	2200-2211 N. Lamar St. 32°47′04″N 96°48′30″W	Dallas	
144	Wedgwood Apartments	Wedgwood Apartments	May 25, 2021 (#100006549)	2511 Wedglea Dr. 32°45′29″N 96°51′37″W	Dallas	
145	Westend Historic District	Westend Historic District	November 14, 1978 (#78002918)	Bounded by Lamar, Griffin, Wood, Market, and Commerce Sts. 32°46′44″N 96°48′21″W	Dallas	Includes State Antiquities Landmark, Recorded Texas Historic Landmarks
146	Wheatley Place Historic District	Wheatley Place Historic District	March 23, 1995 (#95000331)	Bounded by Warren, Atlanta, McDermott, Meadow, Oakland and Dathe; 32°45′54″N 96°45′43″W	Dallas	includes Recorded Texas Historic Landmark; Historic Resources of East and South Dallas MPS
147	Wilson Block	Wilson Block	December 15, 1978 (#78002919)	2902, 2906, 2910 and 2922 Swiss Ave. 32°47′18″N 96°47′05″W	Dallas	
148	Wilson Building	Wilson Building	July 24, 1979 (#79002931)	1621-1623 Main St. 32°46′53″N 96°47′49″W	Dallas	Part of Dallas Downtown Historic District
149	Winnetka Heights Historic District	Winnetka Heights Historic District	November 3, 1983 (#83003758)	Roughly bounded by Davis and 12th Sts., and Rosemont and Willomet Aves. 32°44′39″N 96°50′41″W	Dallas	

== Tarrant County ==
	Name on the Register	Image	Date listed	Location	City or town	Description
1	Allen Chapel AME Church	Allen Chapel AME Church	October 18, 1984 (#84000169)	116 Elm St. 32°45′32″N 97°19′38″W	Fort Worth	Recorded Texas Historic Landmark
2	American Airways Hangar and Administration Building	American Airways Hangar and Administration Building	April 16, 2008 (#08000317)	201 Aviation Wy; 32°45′03″N 97°19′56″W	Fort Worth	
3	Neil P. Anderson Building	Neil P. Anderson Building	March 8, 1978 (#78002981)	411 W. 7th St. 32°45′03″N 97°19′56″W	Fort Worth	Recorded Texas Historic Landmark
4	Arlington Post Office	Arlington Post Office	March 9, 2000 (#00000188)	200 W. Main St. 32°44′10″N 97°06′30″W	Arlington	Historic and Architectural Resources of Arlington MRA
5	Armour Laboratory Building	Armour Laboratory Building	March 3, 2025 (#100011473)	601 E. Exchange Avenue; 32°47′20″N 97°20′38″W	Fort Worth	
6	Stephen F. Austin Elementary School	Stephen F. Austin Elementary School	March 10, 1983 (#83003160)	319 Lipscomb St. 32°44′28″N 97°19′57″W	Fort Worth	
7	Bedford School	Bedford School	August 14, 1997 (#97000851)	2400 School Ln; 32°50′46″N 97°08′26″W	Bedford	
8	M. A. Benton House	M. A. Benton House	May 22, 1978 (#78002982)	1730 6th Ave. 32°43′31″N 97°20′24″W	Fort Worth	Recorded Texas Historic Landmark; part of Fairmount-Southside Historic District
9	Blackstone Hotel	Blackstone Hotel	February 2, 1984 (#84001961)	601 Main St. 32°45′13″N 97°19′48″W	Fort Worth	Recorded Texas Historic Landmark
10	Botts-Fowler House	Botts-Fowler House	July 1, 1999 (#99000723)	115 N. Fourth Ave. 32°33′55″N 97°08′45″W	Mansfield	
11	Andrew "Cap" and Emma Doughty Bratton House	Andrew "Cap" and Emma Doughty Bratton House	May 22, 2003 (#03000432)	310 E. Broad St. 32°33′46″N 97°08′19″W	Mansfield	Historic and Architectural Resources of Mansfield MPS
12	Bryce Building	Bryce Building	February 23, 1984 (#84001963)	909 Throckmorton St. 32°45′04″N 97°19′50″W	Fort Worth	Recorded Texas Historic Landmark
13	William J. Bryce House	William J. Bryce House	March 1, 1984 (#84001965)	4900 Bryce Ave. 32°44′23″N 97°23′35″W	Fort Worth	Recorded Texas Historic Landmark
14	Buchanan-Hayter-Witherspoon House	Buchanan-Hayter-Witherspoon House	May 22, 2003 (#03000433)	306 E. Broad St. 32°33′46″N 97°08′19″W	Mansfield	Historic and Architectural Resources of Mansfield MPS
15	Burk Burnett Building	Burk Burnett Building	November 12, 1980 (#80004151)	500-502 Main St. 32°45′15″N 97°19′51″W	Fort Worth	
16	Butler Place Historic District	Butler Place Historic District	August 4, 2011 (#11000514)	Roughly bounded by Luella St., I.M. Terrell Way Cir. M., 19th St. & I-35 West, 32°44′59″N 97°19′01″W	Fort Worth	
17	Central Handley Historic District	Central Handley Historic District	January 17, 2002 (#01001472)	Roughly bounded by E. Lancaster Ave., Forest Ave., Kerr St., and Handley Dr. 32°43′58″N 97°13′08″W	Fort Worth	
18	Lester H. and Mabel Bryant Chorn House	Lester H. and Mabel Bryant Chorn House	May 22, 2003 (#03000434)	303 E. Broad St. 32°33′48″N 97°08′21″W	Mansfield	Historic and Architectural Resources of Mansfield MPS
19	Lily B. Clayton Elementary School	Lily B. Clayton Elementary School	January 17, 2017 (#100000504)	2000 Park Place Ave; 32°43′34″N 97°20′56″W	Fort Worth	
20	W.I. Cook Memorial Hospital	W.I. Cook Memorial Hospital	May 1, 2024 (#100010262)	1212 West Lancaster Avenue; 32°44′48″N 97°20′22″W	Fort Worth	
21	Cotton Belt Railroad Industrial Historic District	Cotton Belt Railroad Industrial Historic District	September 4, 1997 (#97001109)	Along RR tracks, roughly bounded by Hudgins, Dooley, and Dallas Sts. 32°56′00″N 97°04′42″W	Grapevine	Historic and Architectural Resources of Grapevine MPS
22	Eddleman-McFarland House	Eddleman-McFarland House	October 18, 1979 (#79003009)	1110 Penn St. 32°44′50″N 97°20′33″W	Fort Worth	Recorded Texas Historic Landmark
23	Eighth Avenue Historic District	Eighth Avenue Historic District	November 21, 2006 (#06001065)	Bounded by 8th Ave., Pennsylvania Ave., 9th Ave., and Pruitt St. 32°44′24″N 97°20′39″W	Fort Worth	Includes Recorded Texas Historic Landmark
24	Electric Building	Electric Building	February 10, 1995 (#95000048)	410 W. 7th St. 32°45′05″N 97°19′58″W	Fort Worth	
25	Elizabeth Boulevard Historic District	Elizabeth Boulevard Historic District	November 16, 1979 (#79003010)	1001-1616 Elizabeth Blvd. 32°42′58″N 97°20′20″W	Fort Worth	
26	Fair Building	Fair Building	July 23, 2020 (#100005350)	307 West 7th St. 32°45′06″N 97°19′54″W	Fort Worth	
27	Fairmount-Southside Historic District	Fairmount-Southside Historic District	April 5, 1990 (#90000490); May 12, 1999 boundary increase (#99000565)	Roughly bounded by Magnolia, Hemphill, Eighth, and Jessamine; 32°43′30″N 97°20′15″W	Fort Worth	Includes Recorded Texas Historic Landmarks
28	Farmers and Mechanics National Bank	Farmers and Mechanics National Bank	December 4, 2012 (#12001004)	714 Main St. 32°45′10″N 97°19′49″W	Fort Worth	Now the main headquarters of XTO Energy
29	Farrington Field and Public Schools Gymnasium	Farrington Field and Public Schools Gymnasium	February 2, 2022 (#100007403)	1501 University Dr. and 1400 Foch St. 32°44′43″N 97°21′25″W	Fort Worth	
30	First Christian Church	First Christian Church	October 6, 1983 (#83003812)	612 Throckorton St. 32°45′09″N 97°19′57″W	Fort Worth	
31	First National Bank Building	First National Bank Building	December 3, 2009 (#09000981)	711 Houston St. 32°45′09″N 97°19′50″W	Fort Worth	
32	Flatiron Building	Flatiron Building	March 31, 1971 (#71000964)	1000 Houston St. 32°45′01″N 97°19′46″W	Fort Worth	Recorded Texas Historic Landmark
33	Fort Worth Botanic Garden	Fort Worth Botanic Garden	January 29, 2009 (#08001400)	3220 Botanic Garden Blvd. 32°44′26″N 97°21′46″W	Fort Worth	
34	Fort Worth Club Building – 1916	Fort Worth Club Building – 1916	February 12, 1998 (#98000102)	608-610 Main St. 32°45′12″N 97°19′51″W	Fort Worth	
35	Fort Worth Elks Lodge 124	Fort Worth Elks Lodge 124	February 16, 1984 (#84001969)	512 W. 4th St. 32°45′10″N 97°20′05″W	Fort Worth	Recorded Texas Historic Landmark
36	Fort Worth High School	Fort Worth High School	December 12, 2002 (#02001515)	1015 S. Jennings Ave. 32°44′08″N 97°19′46″W	Fort Worth	
37	Fort Worth National Bank	Fort Worth National Bank	September 9, 2022 (#100008197)	115 West 7th St. 32°45′09″N 97°19′49″W	Fort Worth	
38	Fort Worth Public Market	Fort Worth Public Market	January 5, 1984 (#84001981)	1400 Henderson St. 32°44′39″N 97°20′16″W	Fort Worth	Recorded Texas Historic Landmark
39	Fort Worth Recreation Building	Fort Worth Recreation Building	June 13, 2014 (#14000343)	215 West Vickery Boulevard; 32°44′36″N 97°19′39″W	Fort Worth	
40	Fort Worth Stockyards Historic District	Fort Worth Stockyards Historic District	June 29, 1976 (#76002067)	Roughly bounded by 23rd, Houston, and 28th Sts., and railroad 32°47′25″N 97°20′46″W	Fort Worth	Includes State Antiquities Landmarks, Recorded Texas Historic Landmark
41	Fort Worth US Courthouse	Fort Worth US Courthouse	April 25, 2001 (#01000437)	501 W. 10th St. 32°44′56″N 97°20′02″W	Fort Worth	
42	Fort Worth Warehouse and Transfer Company Building	Fort Worth Warehouse and Transfer Company Building	March 27, 2013 (#13000126)	201 S. Calhoun St. 32°44′33″N 97°19′25″W	Fort Worth	
43	Fortune Arms Apartments	Fortune Arms Apartments	June 7, 2016 (#16000353)	601 W. 1st St. 32°45′15″N 97°20′11″W	Fort Worth	
44	Eldred W. Foster House	Eldred W. Foster House	August 28, 2012 (#12000589)	9608 Heron Dr. 32°47′43″N 97°29′10″W	Fort Worth	
45	Grand Avenue Historic District	Grand Avenue Historic District	March 1, 1990 (#90000337)	Roughly Grand Ave. from Northside to Park; 32°46′20″N 97°21′38″W	Fort Worth	
46	Grapevine Commercial Historic District	Grapevine Commercial Historic District	March 9, 1992 (#92000097); May 16, 1997 boundary increase (#97000444); December 19, 2002 boundary increase (#02001569)	300-530 S. Main St. 32°56′12″N 97°04′43″W	Grapevine	Includes Recorded Texas Historic Landmark; Historic and Architectural Resources of Grapevine MPS
47	James E. Guinn School	James E. Guinn School	May 12, 1998 (#98000429)	1200 South Freeway; 32°43′54″N 97°19′15″W	Fort Worth	
48	Gulf, Colorado and Santa Fe Railroad Passenger Station	Gulf, Colorado and Santa Fe Railroad Passenger Station	October 15, 1970 (#70000760)	1601 Jones St. 32°44′57″N 97°19′26″W	Fort Worth	Recorded Texas Historic Landmark
49	Hamilton Apartments	Hamilton Apartments	August 29, 2018 (#100002850)	2837 Hemphill St. 32°42′36″N 97°19′53″W	Fort Worth	
50	Henderson Street Bridge	Henderson Street Bridge	March 21, 2011 (#11000128)	Henderson Street at the Clear Fork of the Trinity River; 32°45′29″N 97°20′32″W	Fort Worth	Historic Bridges of Texas, 1866-1945 MPS
51	Heritage Park Plaza	Heritage Park Plaza	May 10, 2010 (#10000253)	W Bluff St at Main St; 32°45′29″N 97°20′04″W	Fort Worth	
52	Alexander Hogg School	Alexander Hogg School	December 12, 2002 (#02001512)	900 St. Louis Ave. 32°44′13″N 97°19′43″W	Fort Worth	
53	Hotel Texas	Hotel Texas	July 3, 1979 (#79003011); November 26, 2014 boundary increase (#14000966)	815 Main St. and 815 Commerece St. 32°45′09″N 97°19′45″W	Fort Worth	Recorded Texas Historic Landmark
54	Hutcheson-Smith House	Hutcheson-Smith House	August 2, 1984 (#84001993)	312 N. Oak St. 32°44′24″N 97°06′33″W	Arlington	Recorded Texas Historic Landmark; part of Old Town Historic District
55	Inspiration Point Shelter House	Inspiration Point Shelter House	March 31, 2014 (#14000105)	Roughly 250 yds. S. of 2400 blk. of Roberts Cut Off Rd. 32°47′41″N 97°24′36″W	Fort Worth	
56	Jennings-Vickery Historic District	Jennings-Vickery Historic District	February 21, 2017 (#100000674)	Roughly bounded by W. Vickery Blvd., St. Louis & W. Daggett Aves., Hemphill St. & Jennings Ave. underpass 32°44′35″N 97°20′02″W	Fort Worth	
57	Johnson-Elliott House	Johnson-Elliott House	May 10, 1984 (#84001996)	3 Chase Ct. 32°43′31″N 97°19′54″W	Fort Worth	Recorded Texas Historic Landmark; part of Fairmount-Southside Historic District
58	Katy Freight Depot	Katy Freight Depot	February 7, 2020 (#100004969)	100 South Jones St. 32°42′10″N 97°19′24″W	Fort Worth	
59	Knights of Pythias Building	Knights of Pythias Building	April 28, 1970 (#70000761)	315 Main St. 32°45′19″N 97°19′52″W	Fort Worth	Recorded Texas Historic Landmark
60	Elizabeth and Jack Knight House	Elizabeth and Jack Knight House	May 17, 2021 (#100006521)	2811 Simondale Dr. 32°42′39″N 97°22′19″W	Fort Worth	
61	Kress Building	Kress Building	April 4, 2007 (#07000266)	604 Main St. 32°45′12″N 97°19′52″W	Fort Worth	
62	Leuda-May Historic District	Leuda-May Historic District	March 30, 2005 (#05000240)	301-311 W. Leuda and 805-807 May Sts. 32°44′14″N 97°19′44″W	Fort Worth	
63	Ralph Sandiford and Julia Boisseau Man House	Ralph Sandiford and Julia Boisseau Man House	May 22, 2003 (#03000435)	604 W. Broad St. 32°33′55″N 97°08′57″W	Mansfield	Historic and Architectural Resources of Mansfield MPS
64	Marine Commercial Historic District	Marine Commercial Historic District	February 9, 2001 (#01000102)	Roughly defined by N. Main St., bet. N. Side Dr. and N. 14th St. 32°46′39″N 97°20′46″W	Fort Worth	
65	Markeen Apartments	Markeen Apartments	May 2, 2001 (#01000470)	210-14 St. Louis Ave. and 406-10 W. Daggett Ave. 32°44′31″N 97°19′41″W	Fort Worth	Part of Jennings-Vickery Historic District
66	Marrow Bone Spring Archeological Site	Marrow Bone Spring Archeological Site	November 21, 1978 (#78002980)	Vandergriff Park; 32°44′10″N 97°06′33″W	Arlington	
67	Masonic Widows and Orphans Home Historic District	Masonic Widows and Orphans Home Historic District	January 28, 1992 (#91002022)	Roughly bounded by E. Berry St., Mitchell Blvd., Vaughn St., Wichita St. and Glen Garden Dr; 32°42′33″N 97°17′00″W	Fort Worth	
68	Masonic Temple	Masonic Temple	June 19, 2017 (#100001227)	1100 Henderson St. 32°44′50″N 97°20′18″W	Fort Worth	Recorded Texas Historic Landmark
69	Miller Manufacturing Company Building	Miller Manufacturing Company Building	October 28, 2010 (#10000865)	311 Bryan Ave. 32°44′28″N 97°19′29″W	Fort Worth	
70	Montgomery Ward and Company Building	Montgomery Ward and Company Building	November 19, 1998 (#98001415)	801 Grove St. 32°45′14″N 97°19′34″W	Fort Worth	
71	Morning Chapel Colored Methodist Episcopal Church	Morning Chapel Colored Methodist Episcopal Church	August 27, 1999 (#99001049)	901 E. Third St. 32°45′30″N 97°19′32″W	Fort Worth	
72	Thomas J. and Elizabeth Nash Farm	Thomas J. and Elizabeth Nash Farm	October 28, 2010 (#10000866)	626 Ball St. 32°56′03″N 97°05′09″W	Grapevine	Recorded Texas Historic Landmark
73	Near Southeast Historic District	Near Southeast Historic District	April 26, 2002 (#02000405)	Roughly bounded by New York Ave., E. Terrell Ave., former I&GN Railway, Verbena St., and N side of E. Terrell Ave, 32°43′58″N 97°14′15″W	Fort Worth	Includes Recorded Texas Historic Landmark
74	North Fort Worth High School	North Fort Worth High School	February 2, 1995 (#94001627)	600 Park St. 32°46′52″N 97°21′24″W	Fort Worth	
75	Oakhurst Historic District	Oakhurst Historic District	February 24, 2010 (#10000051)	Roughly bounded by Yucca Ave., Sylvania Ave., Watauga Ave., and Oakhurst Scenic Dr. 32°47′08″N 97°18′48″W	Fort Worth	Historic Residential Suburbs in the United States, 1830-1960 MPS
76	Oakwood Cemetery Historic District	Oakwood Cemetery Historic District	May 29, 2018 (#100002473)	701 Grand Ave. 32°46′10″N 97°20′55″W	Fort Worth	Recorded Texas Historic Landmark and includes another
77	Oil & Gas Building	Oil & Gas Building	January 25, 2024 (#100009864)	309 W. 7th Street; 32°45′06″N 97°19′54″W	Fort Worth	
78	Old Town Historic District	Old Town Historic District	March 23, 2000 (#00000247)	Roughly bounded by Sanford, Elm, North, Prairie and Oak Sts. 32°44′27″N 97°06′05″W	Arlington	Includes Recorded Texas Historic Landmarks; Historic and Architectural Resources of Arlington MRA
79	Original Town Residential Historic District	Original Town Residential Historic District	July 10, 1998 (#98000736)	Roughly bounded by Texas, Austin, Hudgins and Jenkins Sts. 32°56′11″N 97°04′28″W	Grapevine	Historic and Architectural Resources of Grapevine MPS
80	Our Lady of Victory Academy	Our Lady of Victory Academy	August 20, 2004 (#04000886)	801 W. Shaw St. 32°42′11″N 97°19′59″W	Fort Worth	
81	Our Mother of Mercy Catholic Church and Parsonage	Our Mother of Mercy Catholic Church and Parsonage	July 22, 1999 (#99000882)	1100 and 1104 Evans Ave. 32°43′57″N 97°19′05″W	Fort Worth	Part of Near Southeast Historic District
82	Our Mother of Mercy School	Our Mother of Mercy School	June 15, 2006 (#06000510)	801 Verbena St. 32°44′06″N 97°19′08″W	Fort Worth	Part of Near Southeast Historic District
83	Fountain G. and Mary Oxsheer House	Fountain G. and Mary Oxsheer House	July 24, 2017 (#100001378)	1119 Pennsylvania Ave. 32°44′17″N 97°20′14″W	Fort Worth	
84	Paddock Viaduct	Paddock Viaduct	March 15, 1976 (#76002068)	Main St. 32°45′33″N 97°20′04″W	Fort Worth	State Antiquities Landmark
85	Parker-Browne Company Building	Parker-Browne Company Building	June 3, 2015 (#15000337)	1212 E. Lancaster Ave. 32°44′45″N 97°19′00″W	Fort Worth	
86	Petroleum Building	Petroleum Building	December 3, 2009 (#09000982)	210 W. 6th St. 32°45′10″N 97°19′54″W	Fort Worth	
87	Pioneers Rest Cemetery	Pioneers Rest Cemetery	January 27, 2021 (#100006072)	600 Samuels Ave. 32°45′56″N 97°19′43″W	Fort Worth	
88	Pollock-Capps House	Pollock-Capps House	June 19, 1972 (#72001372)	1120 Penn St. 32°44′49″N 97°20′33″W	Fort Worth	Recorded Texas Historic Landmark
89	Dr. Arvel and Faye Ponton House	Dr. Arvel and Faye Ponton House	November 29, 2006 (#06001085)	1208 Mistletoe Dr. 32°43′50″N 97°21′22″W	Fort Worth	Recorded Texas Historic Landmark
90	Ridglea Theatre	Ridglea Theatre	December 30, 2011 (#11000982)	6025-6033 Camp Bowie Rd. & 3309 Winthrop Ave. 32°43′44″N 97°24′52″W	Fort Worth	
91	Riverside Baptist Church	Riverside Baptist Church	September 23, 2020 (#100005603)	3111 Race St. 32°46′23″N 97°18′09″W	Fort Worth	
92	Riverside Public School	Riverside Public School	December 30, 1999 (#99001624)	2629 LaSalle St. 32°45′29″N 97°18′19″W	Fort Worth	
93	Will Rogers Memorial Center	Will Rogers Memorial Center	March 22, 2016 (#16000122)	3401 W. Lancaster Ave. 32°44′46″N 97°21′59″W	Fort Worth	
94	Rogers-O'Daniel House	Rogers-O'Daniel House	July 5, 1985 (#85001484)	2230 Warner Rd. 32°42′35″N 97°20′50″W	Fort Worth	Recorded Texas Historic Landmark
95	Saint James Second Street Baptist Church	Saint James Second Street Baptist Church	July 22, 1999 (#99000883)	210 Harding St. 32°45′34″N 97°19′28″W	Fort Worth	Recorded Texas Historic Landmark
96	St. Mary of the Assumption Church	St. Mary of the Assumption Church	May 10, 1984 (#84001998)	501 W. Magnolia Ave. 32°43′49″N 97°19′48″W	Fort Worth	Recorded Texas Historic Landmark
97	St. Patrick Cathedral Complex	St. Patrick Cathedral Complex	January 7, 1985 (#85000074)	1206 Throckmorton; 32°44′56″N 97°19′46″W	Fort Worth	Includes Recorded Texas Historic Landmarks
98	Sanger Brothers Building	Sanger Brothers Building	June 3, 1994 (#94000542)	410-412 Houston St. 32°45′15″N 97°19′55″W	Fort Worth	
99	Sanger Brothers Building	Sanger Brothers Building	December 10, 2014 (#14001035)	515 Houston St. 32°45′13″N 97°19′53″W	Fort Worth	
100	Marshall R. Sanguinet House	Marshall R. Sanguinet House	June 7, 1983 (#83003162)	4729 Collinwood Ave. 32°44′14″N 97°23′26″W	Fort Worth	Recorded Texas Historic Landmark
101	J.L. Sealy Building	J.L. Sealy Building	August 20, 2013 (#13000612)	801 S. Main St. 32°44′11″N 97°19′33″W	Fort Worth	
102	Shannon's Funeral Home	Shannon's Funeral Home	July 23, 2018 (#100002699)	2717 Ave. B 32°44′04″N 97°17′10″W	Fort Worth	
103	Thomas and Marjorie Shaw House	Thomas and Marjorie Shaw House	August 22, 1995 (#95001029)	2404 Medford Ct. E. 32°43′03″N 97°21′24″W	Fort Worth	Recorded Texas Historic Landmark
104	Sinclair Building	Sinclair Building	January 7, 1992 (#91001913)	512 Main St. 32°45′14″N 97°19′51″W	Fort Worth	Recorded Texas Historic Landmark
105	South Center Street Historic District	South Center Street Historic District	May 1, 2003 (#03000334)	500-600 blocks of S. Center St. 32°43′53″N 97°06′24″W	Arlington	
106	South Main St. Historic District	South Main St. Historic District	December 3, 2009 (#09000984)	104, 108, 126, & 200 blocks of S. Main St. 32°44′33″N 97°19′33″W	Fort Worth	
107	South Side Masonic Lodge No. 1114	South Side Masonic Lodge No. 1114	January 3, 1985 (#85000048)	1301 W. Magnolia; 32°43′48″N 97°20′16″W	Fort Worth	Part of Fairmount-Southside Historic District
108	Tabernacle Baptist Church	Tabernacle Baptist Church	November 30, 1999 (#99001451)	1801 Evans Ave. 32°43′29″N 97°19′03″W	Fort Worth	
109	Tarrant County Courthouse	Tarrant County Courthouse	October 15, 1970 (#70000762)	Bounded by Houston, Belknap, Weatherford, and Commerce Sts. 32°45′26″N 97°19′58″W	Fort Worth	State Antiquities Landmark, Recorded Texas Historic Landmark
110	Texas and Pacific Terminal Complex	Texas and Pacific Terminal Complex	May 26, 1978 (#78002983)	Lancaster and Throckmorton Sts. 32°44′45″N 97°19′43″W	Fort Worth	Recorded Texas Historic Landmark
111	Texas Garden Clubs, Inc., Headquarters	Texas Garden Clubs, Inc., Headquarters	March 21, 2011 (#11000136)	3111 Old Garden Rd. 32°44′09″N 97°21′52″W	Fort Worth	Recorded Texas Historic Landmark
112	US Post Office	US Post Office	April 15, 1985 (#85000855)	251 W. Lancaster Ave. 32°44′47″N 97°19′46″W	Fort Worth	Recorded Texas Historic Landmark
113	Van Zandt Cottage	Van Zandt Cottage	December 4, 2012 (#12001005)	2900 Crestline Rd. 32°44′39″N 97°21′32″W	Fort Worth	Recorded Texas Historic Landmark
114	Vandergriff Building	Vandergriff Building	July 26, 2010 (#10000500)	100 E Division St. 32°44′20″N 97°06′24″W	Arlington	
115	Vaught House	Vaught House	August 10, 2005 (#05000864)	718 W. Abram St. 32°44′06″N 97°06′56″W	Arlington	
116	W. T. Waggoner Building	W. T. Waggoner Building	July 10, 1979 (#79003012)	810 Houston St. 32°45′05″N 97°19′49″W	Fort Worth	
117	Wallace-Hall House	Wallace-Hall House	May 22, 2003 (#03000436)	210 S. Main St. 32°33′42″N 97°08′32″W	Mansfield	Historic and Architectural Resources of Mansfield MPS
118	Roy A. and Gladys Westbrook House	Roy A. and Gladys Westbrook House	January 8, 2009 (#08001300)	2232 Winton Terrace W. 32°43′15″N 97°21′35″W	Fort Worth	Recorded Texas Historic Landmark
119	Westover Manor	Westover Manor	December 15, 1988 (#88002709)	8 Westover Rd. 32°44′31″N 97°24′14″W	Westover Hills	Recorded Texas Historic Landmark
120	Wharton-Scott House	Wharton-Scott House	April 14, 1975 (#75002003)	1509 Pennsylvania Ave. 32°44′16″N 97°20′32″W	Fort Worth	Recorded Texas Historic Landmark
121	The Woman's Club of Fort Worth	The Woman's Club of Fort Worth	April 10, 2017 (#100000862)	N. side, 1300 blk. Pennsylvania Ave. 32°26′31″N 97°12′09″W	Fort Worth	Includes Recorded Texas Historic Landmarks
122	F. W. Woolworth Building	F. W. Woolworth Building	November 25, 1994 (#94001359)	501 Houston St. 32°45′12″N 97°19′52″W	Fort Worth	
