= Wyatt C. Hedrick =

American architect (1888–1964)

Wyatt Cephus Hedrick
- Born: December 17, 1888; Chatham, Virginia, United States
- Died: May 5, 1964 (aged 75); Houston, Texas, United States
- Education: Roanoke College; Washington and Lee University
- Occupation: Architect
- Spouses: Pauline Stripling; Mildred Sterling Hedrick
- Practice: Wyatt Hedrick & Co.
- Buildings: Administration Building; Eudora Welty House; Shamrock Hotel
- Projects: Texas and Pacific Terminal Complex; Will Rogers Memorial Center

Wyatt Cephus Hedrick (December 17, 1888, in Chatham, Virginia – May 5, 1964, in Houston, Texas) was an American architect, engineer, and developer most active in Texas and the American South. He began his career as an engineer, working in Virginia and Texas. He started his own firm in Fort Worth, and later merged with the architecture firm of Sanguinet & Staats before buying out the interests of the senior partners.

== Early life ==
Wyatt Cephus Hedrick was born December 17, 1888, in Chatham, Virginia, to Washington Henry and Emma Cephas (Williams) Hedrick. He matriculated at Roanoke College, gaining his bachelor's degree in 1909. He earned a degree in engineering the next year from Washington and Lee University.

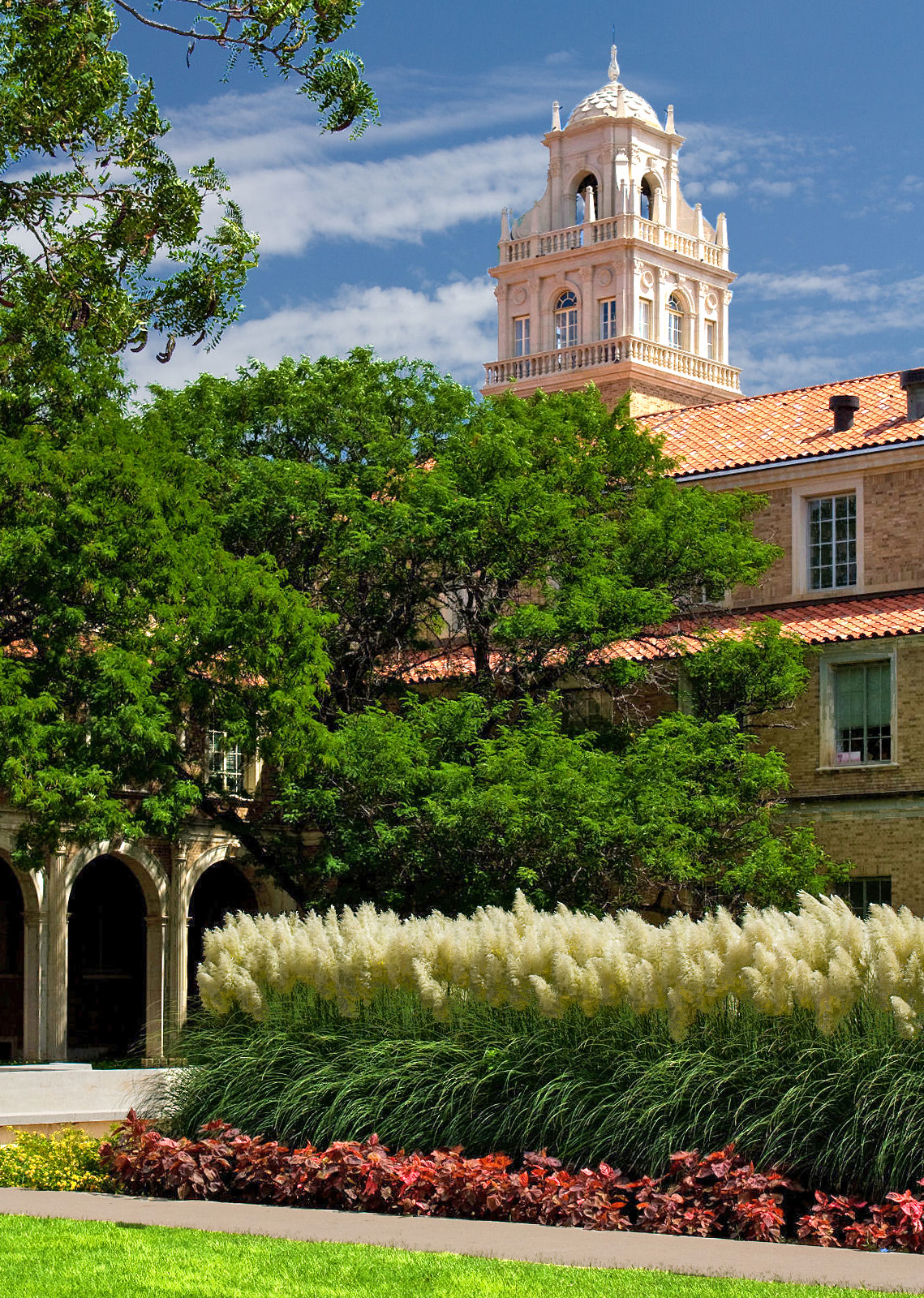
1925 — Administration Building, Texas Tech University, Lubbock, Texas

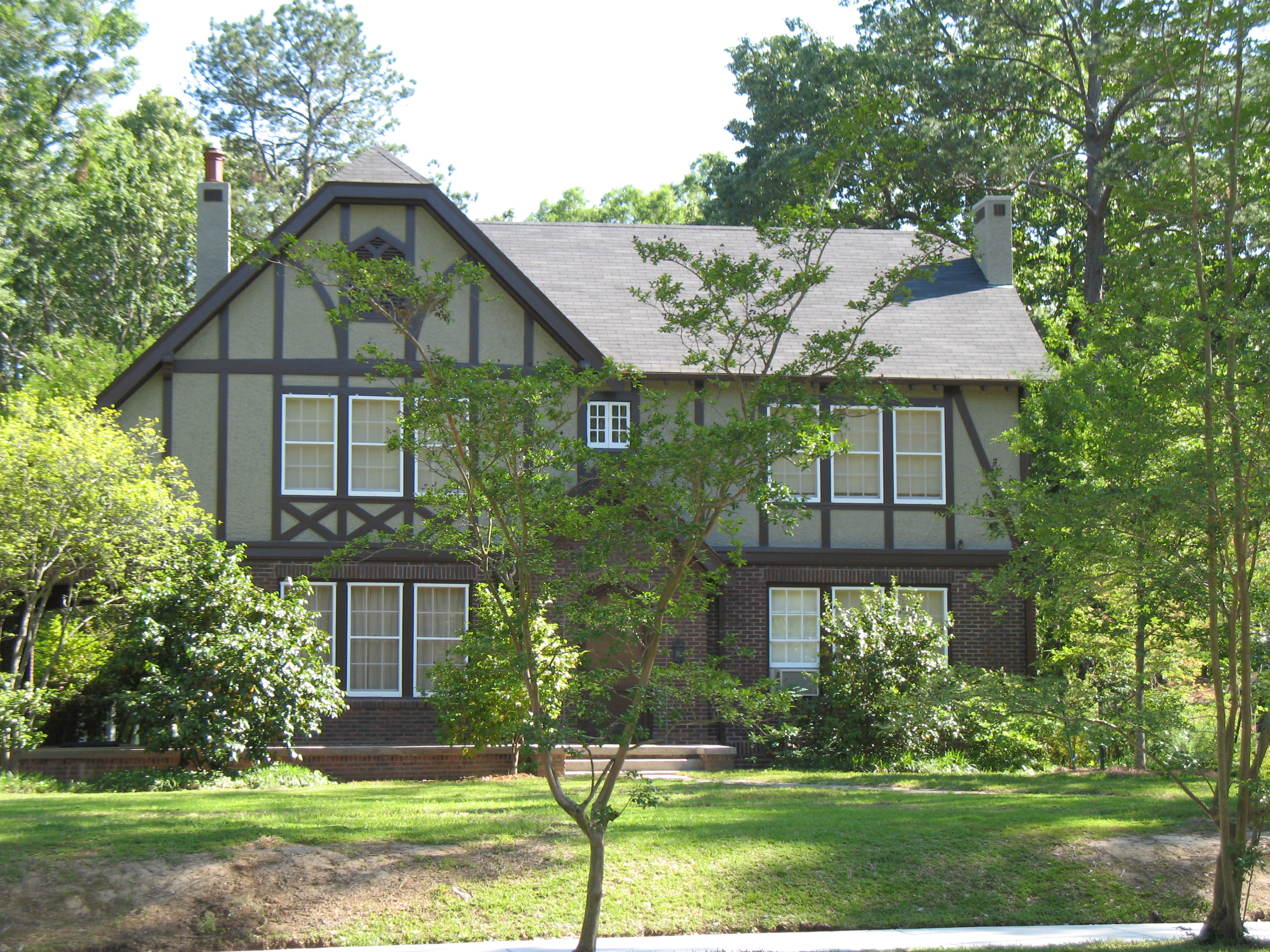
1925 — Eudora Welty House, Jackson, Mississippi

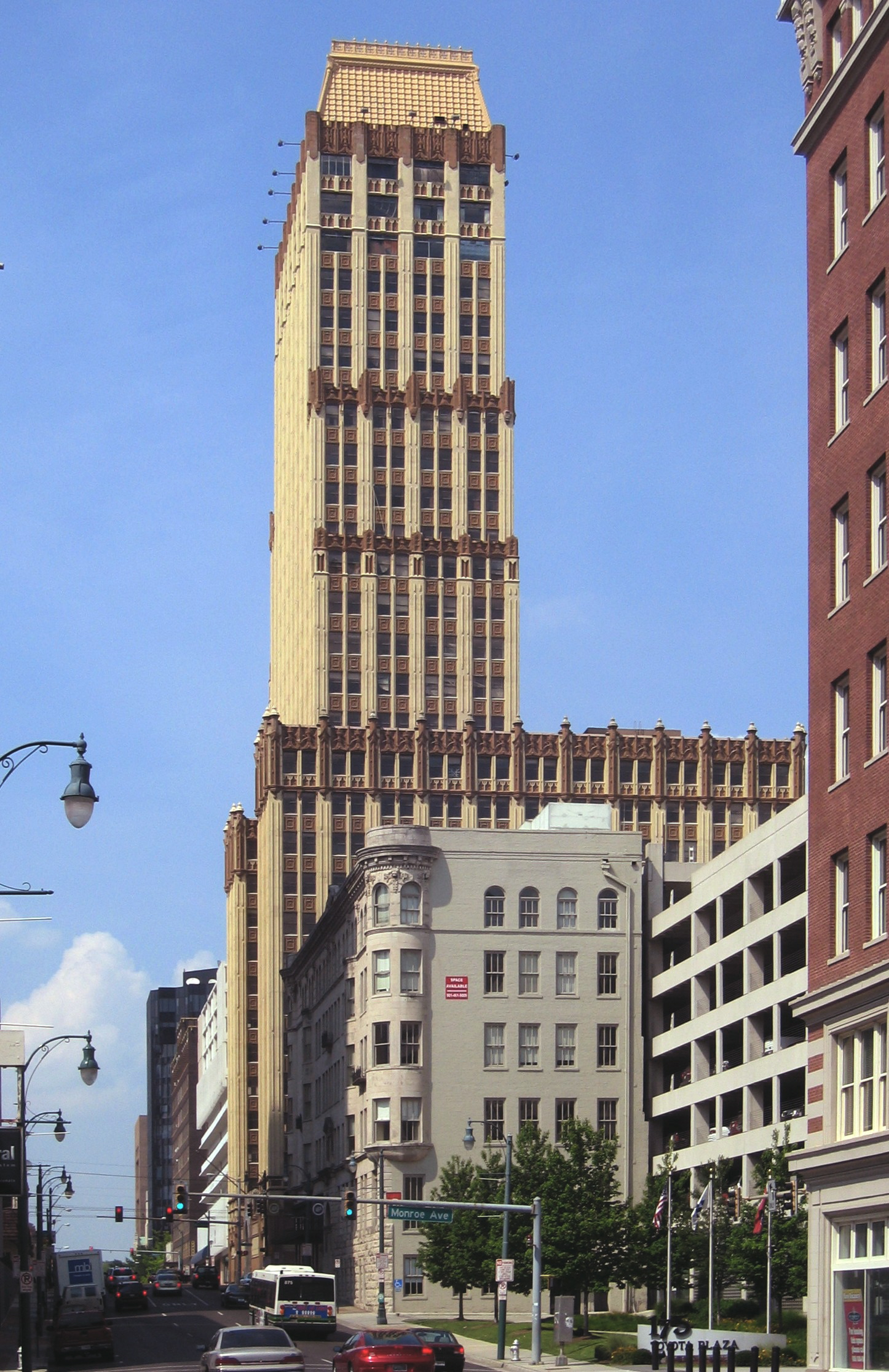
1930 — Sterick Building, Memphis, Tennessee

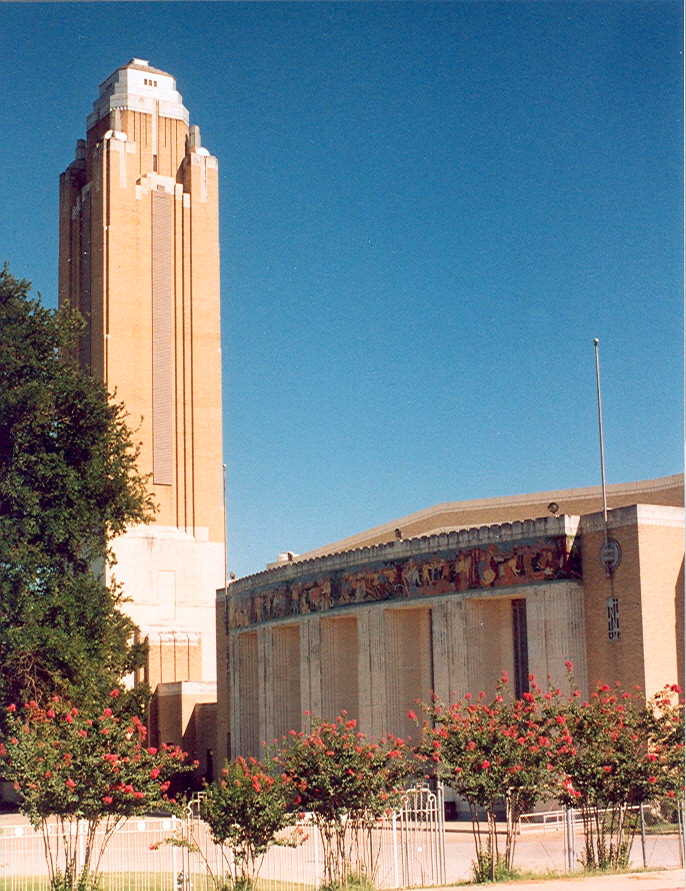
1936 — Will Rogers Memorial Center, Fort Worth, Texas

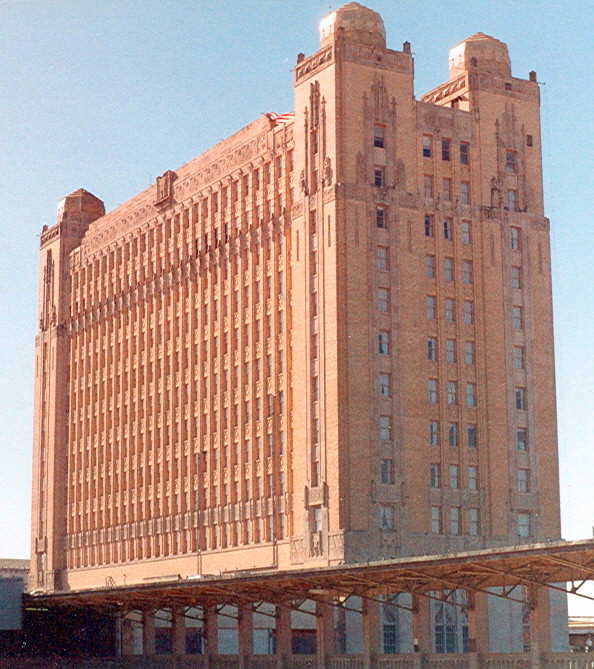
1931 — Texas and Pacific Terminal and Warehouse, Fort Worth, Texas

== Career ==
In 1910, Hedrick started a career in engineering, working briefly for Lane Brothers in his home state. Later that year he accepted a position at the Dallas office of Stone and Webster Engineering Corporation. He was a construction engineer for about three years.

In 1914, Hedrick started his own engineering firm in Fort Worth under the name of Wyatt C. Hedrick Construction Company.

Hedrick was accepted into the partnership of Sanguinet & Staats in 1921, an architecture firm based in Fort Worth which specialized in skyscrapers.

After a year, Hedrick began his work as an architect in Fort Worth, Texas, and three years later opened his own office. He was responsible for many of the tallest buildings in Fort Worth, and several of his works are included on the National Register of Historic Places. Fort Worth's first Art Moderne skyscraper, the Worth Theatre (1927), was designed by Hedrick while partnered with Sanguinet & Staats.

Hedrick worked mainly in a stripped-down classical style. With his extensive university and government work, at one time his firm was the third-largest in the United States.

Hedrick is also known for his eight Texas courthouses, all of which are still standing. They include: Austin County, Brazoria County, Coke County, Coleman County, Comanche, County, Kent County, Motley County, and Yoakum County.

== Personal life ==
In 1918 he married Pauline Stripling. In 1925, he married Mildred Sterling, and in 1931 his father-in-law, Ross S. Sterling, became governor of Texas.

== Works ==
A list of works by Hedrick in chronological order, with shared attribution where applicable:

| Fort Worth | City | Address | Year | NRHP-listed? | Status | Firm | Notes |
|---|---|---|---|---|---|---|---|
| First National Bank Building | Fort Worth | 711 Houston St. | 1910 | yes | | Sanguinet & Staats with Hedrick | |
| Houston Street Viaduct | Dallas | Houston St. roughly between Arlington St. and Lancaster Ave. | 1911 | yes | | Hedrick & Cochrane | |
| Neil P. Anderson Building | Fort Worth | 411 W. 7th St. | 1921 | yes | | Sanguinet & Staats; W. C. Hedrick Construction | |
| Petroleum Building | Fort Worth | 210 W. 6th. St. | 1921 | yes | | | |
| West Texas Utilities Company Power Plant | Abilene, Texas | 100 Block of N. Second St. | 1922 | yes | | | |
| Sam Houston Hotel | Houston | 1117 Prairie St. | 1924 | yes | | Sanguinet, Staats, Hedrick & Gottlie | |
| St. Mary of the Assumption Church | Fort Worth | 501 W. Magnolia Ave. | 1924 | yes | | Sanguinet, Staats & Hedrick | |
| Eudora Welty House | Jackson, Mississippi | 1119 Pinehurst St. | 1925 | yes | | | |
| Administration Building | Lubbock, Texas | Texas Tech University | 1925 | | | Sanguinet, Staats and Hedrick | William Ward Watkin, associate architect |
| Sanger Brothers Building | Fort Worth | 410–412 Houston St. | 1925 | yes | | | |
| Medical Arts Building | Fort Worth | | 1926 | | Razed | | |
| Medical Arts Building | Houston | | 1926 | | | Sanguinet, Staats, Hedrick and Gottlieb | |
| The Oliver Rea Eakle Building (Name changed to The Barfield in ~1947) | Amarillo | 600 S. Polk St. | 1926 | yes | Undergoing restoration as of Oct. 2019 | Sanguinet, Staats, Hedrick and Gottlieb | |
| Fort Worth Elks Lodge 124 | Fort Worth | 512 W. 4th St. | 1927 | yes | | | |
| Snider Hall | Dallas | 3305 Dyer St. | 1927 | yes | | | |
| Texas Technological College Dairy Barn | Lubbock | Texas Tech University | 1927 | yes | | Sanguinet, Staats & Hedrick | |
| Virginia Hall (Dallas, Texas), SMU campus | Dallas | 3325 Dyer St. | 1927 | yes | | | |
| Fort Worth and Denver South Plains Railway Depot | Lubbock, Texas | 1801 Ave. G | 1927 | yes | | | |
| Islamic Da’wah Center of Houston | Houston, Texas | 202 Main St. | 1928 | yes | | Hedrick & Gottlieb, Inc. | Formerly Houston National Bank |
| Chemistry Building, Texas Tech University | Lubbock | Texas Tech University | 1928 | | | Wyatt C. Hedrick and Company | William Ward Watkin, associate architect |
| Electric Building | Fort Worth | 410 W. 7th St. | 1929 | yes | | | |
| Petroleum Building and Yucca Theatre | Midland, Texas | | 1929 | | | | aka Hogan Building |
| First Presbyterian Church (Corpus Christi, Texas) | Corpus Christi, Texas | 430 S. Carancahua St. | 1929 | | | | |
| Baker Hotel | Mineral Wells, TX | 200 E. Hubbard St. | 1929 | yes | | | |
| Sterick Building | Memphis, Tennessee | 8 N. 3rd St. | 1930 | yes | | | |
| Commerce Building | Fort Worth | | 1930 | | | | |
| Texas and Pacific Terminal and Warehouse | Fort Worth | Lancaster and Throckmorton Sts. | 1931 | yes | | | NRHP-listed as Texas and Pacific Terminal Complex, Art Deco skyscraper |
| Psychopathic Hospital | Bolivar, Tennessee | | 1932 | | Polk Building | | Within NRHP-listed Western State Hospital Historic District |
| United States Post Office | Fort Worth | Lancaster and Jennings Ave. | 1933 | yes | | | |
| Will Rogers Memorial Center | Fort Worth | | 1936 | | | With Elmer G. Withers | |
| Fort Worth City Hall | | | 1938 | yes | Public Safety and Courts Building | | With Elmer G. Withers |
| First National Bank | Midland, Texas | | 1938 | | | Hedrick and Company | |
| Amarillo US Post Office and Courthouse | Amarillo, Texas | 205 E. Fifth St. | 1939 | yes | | | |
| Comanche County Courthouse (Comanche, Texas) | Comanche, Texas | | 1939 | | | Wyatt C. Hedrick | WPA project |
| Star School building | Star, Texas | | 1940 | | | Wyatt C. Hedrick | WPA project |
| B H Carroll Memorial Building | Fort Worth | | 1948 | | | | |
| Shamrock Hotel | Houston | | 1949 | | Razed | | |
| Corrigan Tower | Dallas | | 1952 | | | | |
| Remodel of Coleman County Courthouse | Coleman, Texas | | 1952 | | | Wyatt Hedrick | |
| Cotton Belt Building | Tyler, Texas | 1517 W. Front St. | 1955 | yes | | H. J. McKenzie and Wyatt C. Hedrick | |
| Coke County Courthouse | Robert Lee, Texas | | 1956 | | | Wyatt C. Hedrick, with Harry Weaver | |
| Annex to Live Oak County Courthouse | George West, Texas | | 1956 | | | Wyatt Hedrick | |
| Rosedale Park Elementary School (Maudrie Walton Elementary School) | Fort Worth | 5816 Rickenbacker Pl. | 1956 | | | Wyatt C. Hedrick | |
| Austin County Courthouse | Bellville, Texas | | 1960 | | | Wyatt C. Hedrick | |
| Fidelity Union Life Insurance Building | Dallas | 1511 Bryan and 1507 Pacific Ave. | 1965 | yes | | | |
| | | | | yes | | | |
| | | | | yes | | | |
| Addition to Brazoria County Courthouse | Angleton, Texas | | 1976 | yes | | Wyatt C. Hedrick | |

- One or more works in Wharton County Courthouse Historic Commercial District, Roughly bounded by the alley N of Milam St., Rusk St., Elm St. and Richmond St. Wharton, TX, NRHP-listed

== Bibliography ==
- Henry, Jay C. (1993). Architecture in Texas: 1895–1945. Austin: University of Texas Press.
- Kelsey, Mavis P. Sr.; Dyal, Donald H. (2007). The Courthouses of Texas (Second ed.). College Station: Texas A&M University Press. ISBN 978-1-58544-549-3.
- Liles, Deborah M. (2008). "Wyatt Cephas Hedrick: Builder of Cities" (PDF). University of North Texas. Master's thesis.
