= Eudora Welty House =

- Eudora Welty House & Garden
- U.S. National Register of Historic Places
- U.S. National Historic Landmark
- Mississippi Landmark
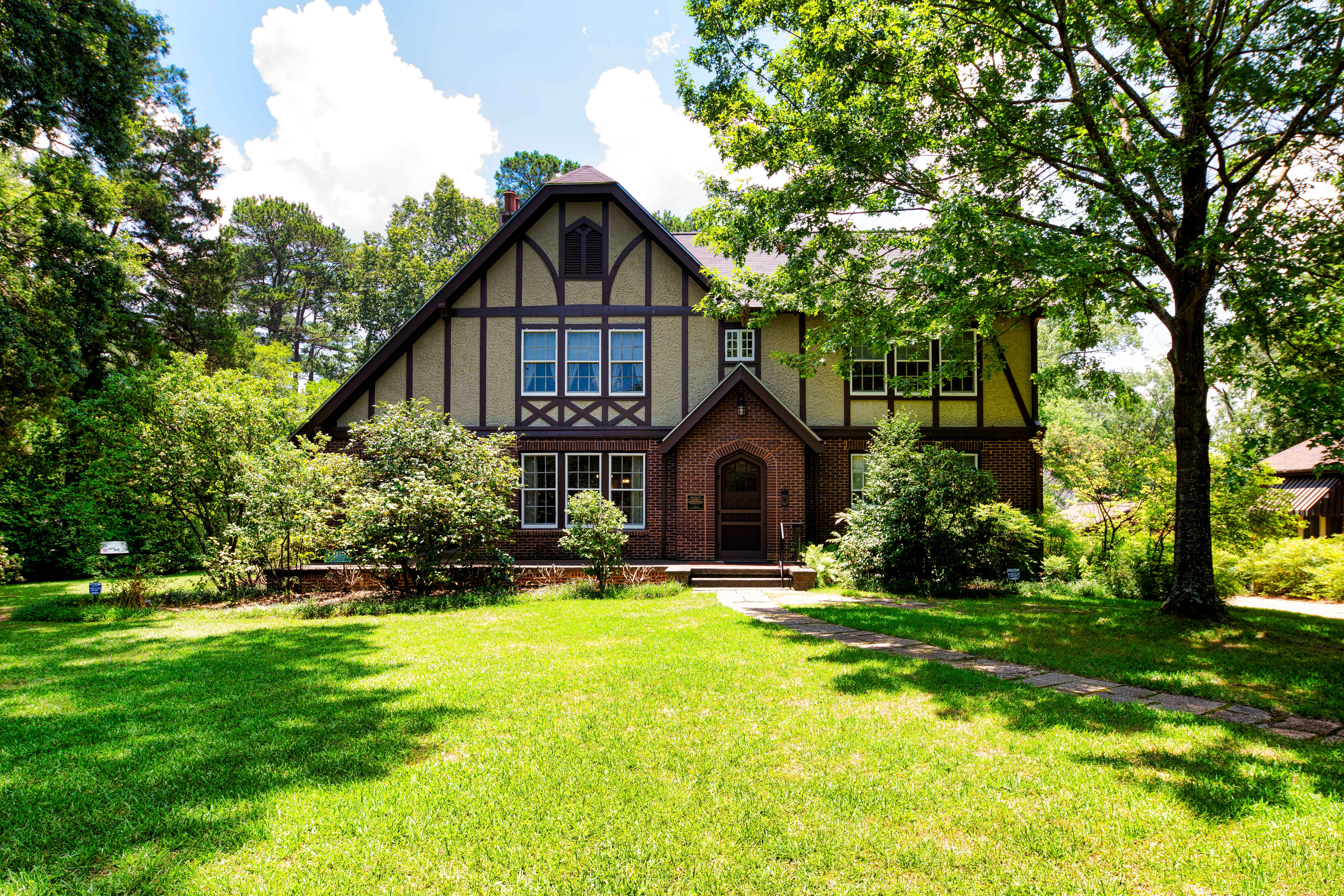
- Eudora Welty House & Garden [front]

- Location within Mississippi Location within the United States
- Location: 1119 Pinehurst Street, Jackson, Mississippi
- Coordinates: 32°19′7.7″N 90°10′13.22″W
- Built: 1925
- Architect: Wyatt C. Hedrick
- Architectural style: Tudor Revival
- NRHP reference No.: 02001388
- USMS No.: 049-JAC-5917-NHL-ML

Significant dates
- Added to NRHP: November 21, 2002
- Designated NHL: August 18, 2004
- Designated USMS: September 21, 2001

The Eudora Welty House & Garden is a historic house museum located at 1119 Pinehurst Street in Jackson, Mississippi. It was the home of author Eudora Welty for nearly 80 years.

== Overview ==
The home was built by her parents in 1925. The author lived in the home from age 16 until her death in 2001. Welty and her mother built and tended to the garden located at the side and back of the home over decades. Welty could often be found writing in her bedroom or on the porch, which frequently hosted her peers in writing.

Welty willed the property to the state of Mississippi after her death, including her various personal possessions, furniture, artwork, and library. The house was first declared a Mississippi Landmark in 2001, added to the National Register of Historic Places in 2002, and declared a National Historic Landmark in 2004.

The house was restored by the Eudora Welty Foundation and the Mississippi Department of Archives and History. In 2006, the house and garden were opened to the public as an author's house museum. It has been deemed one of the most intact literary homes in the United States in terms of authenticity as much of the home and its setup remains as it did when Welty died.

The renovation of the house and garden is part of a larger effort to celebrate and promote Mississippi's literary heritage as a means of developing tourism to the state.

== Visitor center ==
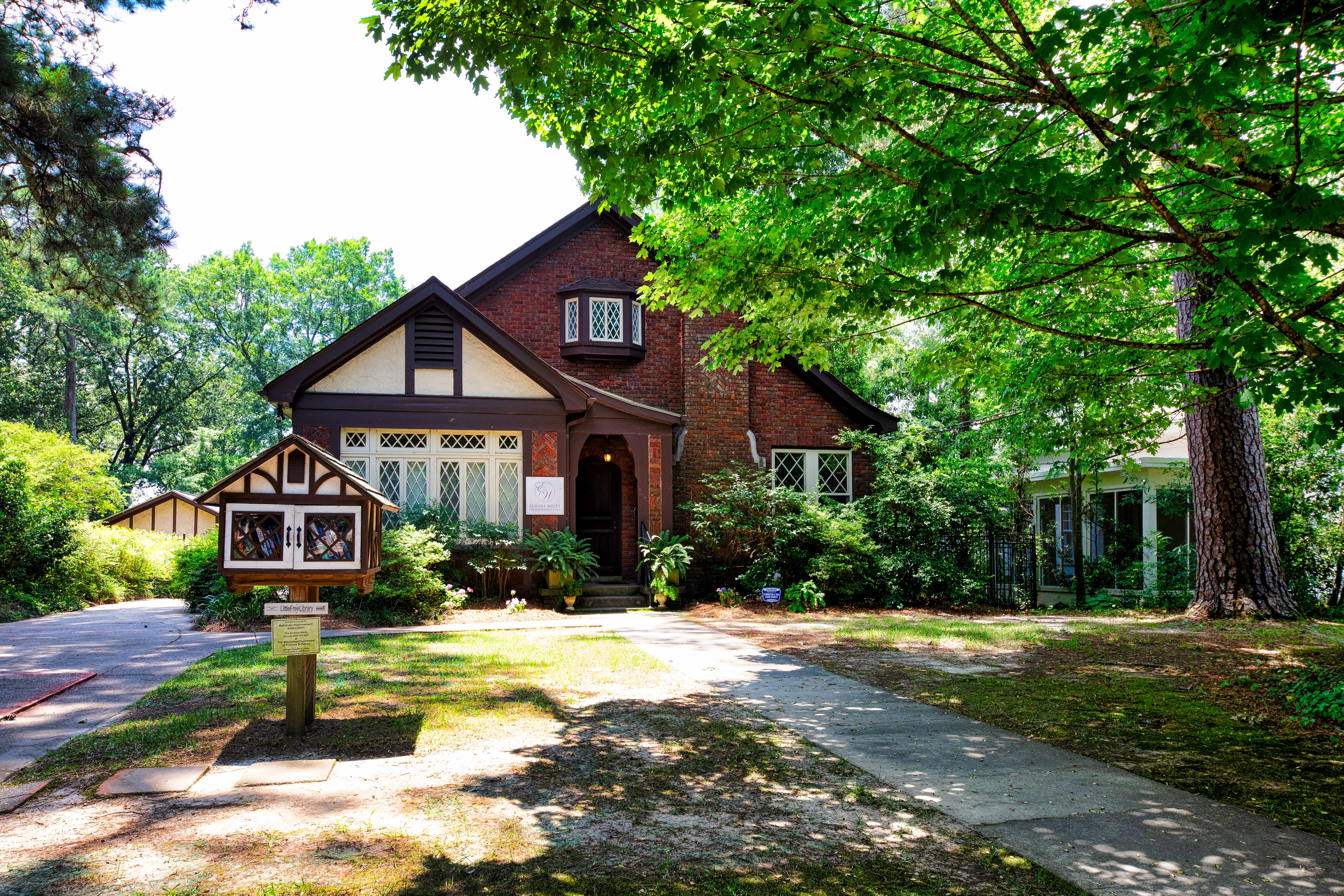
The Visitor Center for the Eudora Welty House and Garden and home to a "Little Library".

In 2009, the Education and Visitors Center was opened next door at 1109 Pinehurst Street. There, visitors can purchase tickets to tour the Welty House, see a selection of Welty's literary awards, and explore exhibits based on the author's memoir, One Writer's Beginnings. This center is used to provide visitors with an overview of Welty's life, writings, and literary achievements. Inside the visitor center is a gift shope where visitors can buy books, shirts, and other memorabilia relating to Eudora Welty. The Visitor Center is also home to a "Little Library", which is a community maintained free library. This is a space dedicated to the preservation of literature.

== Garden ==
This garden behind the home was designed by Chestina Welty, Eudora Welty's mother, in 1925. The garden was often referred to by Eudora and her mother as a labor of love. Chestina Welty put enormous effort into the design of the garden, creating a "succession of bloom" throughout the entire year. For example, over 40 varieties of camellias bloom in the garden throughout the winter months. In the summer, the night-blooming cereus plants bloom on the side porch, an event Welty often invited friends to come spectate.

In the 1950s, as members of the Welty family and their friends experienced bad health, the garden was neglected. After her mother's death, Eudora returned to gardening as a form of comfort. In the 1990s, as Welty aged and became preoccupied with other work, the garden again fell into disrepair. After her death, she authorized the garden's restoration by preservationist Susan Haltom. Haltom, who painstakingly recreated the garden at its peak, had to seek out plants that had become rare, and documented the experience with writer Jane Roy Brown and photographer Langdon Clay in their book One Writer's Garden.

The restored garden has a rose garden section, woodland garden section, and a camellia flower collection. Visitors today are able to tour and explore the vast amount of different species of flowers growing in the garden, many of which feature in Welty's writing. In The Golden Apples the cereus is depicted as "a naked, luminous, complicated flower." Welty also wrote extensively about the garden in her letters.

== See also ==
- List of National Historic Landmarks in Mississippi
- List of residences of American writers
- National Register of Historic Places listings in Hinds County, Mississippi
- Night-Blooming Cereus
