= Western State Hospital Historic District =

Historic district in Tennessee, United States

- U.S. National Register of Historic Places
- U.S. Historic district
- Location within Tennessee Location within the United States
- Location: US 64, Bolivar, Tennessee
- Coordinates: 35.2756°N 89.02674°W
- Area: 37 acres (15 ha)
- Architect: MacDonald Bros.; Hedrick, Wyatt C., Inc.
- Architectural style: Classical Revival, Late Gothic Revival
- NRHP reference No.: 87001057
- Added to NRHP: June 25, 1987

The Western State Hospital Historic District is a 37 acres (15 ha) historic district in Bolivar, Tennessee which was listed on the National Register of Historic Places in 1987. It then included seven contributing buildings and four non-contributing ones. It has also been known as the Western State Hospital for the Insane at Bolivar, as the Western State Psychiatric Hospital, and presently operates as the Western Mental Health Institute, serving 24 counties in West Tennessee.

Its 1889 building was designed by architect Harry Peake McDonald and his brothers Kenneth and Donald. This firm had previously designed the Southwestern Lunatic Asylum in Marion, Virginia. The McDonalds based the design on the Kirkbride Plan. Its 1932 building known as the Psychopathic Hospital, later known as the Polk Building, was designed by architect Wyatt C. Hedrick of Memphis.

== History ==
When officially opened on November 22, 1889, the institution accepted 156 patients from an overcrowded asylum in Nashville. By 1893, 319 patients were institutionalized there. By 1900, the hospital was overcrowded with 594 patients. This overcrowding caused monetary trouble for the hospital, compounded by the state procedure to pay for one patient per 1,000 population. This left the financial burden of many of the patients on the county, who consistently fell behind on payments.

Patient therapy was widely varied and saw a great deal of new techniques implemented in the 1920s and 1930s under superintendent Dr. Edwin W. Cocke. Treatments administered at Western State at this time included: fever therapy, prefrontal lobotomies, insulin shock therapy, and injections of Metrazol. This focus on medical experimentation meant that patient care was not paramount. Many patients had little-to-no privacy and were crowded into overpopulated dormitories. With the abundance of patients relative to the number of staff, patients would seldom receive more than ten minutes per week with a psychiatrist. For nearly 30 years in the mid-20th century, all of the children born to women institutionalized at Western State sent to child trafficker Georgia Tann's Tennessee Children's Home Society. Many of the patients who died at the hospital were buried in various cemeteries dotted around the campus.

Cocke was the co-producer of the first diathermy to produce an artificial fever to aid in treating syphilis in the brain. During Cocke's tenure as superintendent, the hospital received acceptance from the AMA and the American College of Surgeons. It was during this time many new buildings were added, including a tuberculosis ward, a cottage, Winston Hall, the Polk Building, and the Doctors Apartment Building. Additionally, a new operating room was opened, a telephone system was installed, the kitchen was modernized, x-ray equipment was purchased, and a dentist and dietician were hired.

Due to segregationist policies in the area, a separate, two-story ward was built for African American patients, finishing construction in 1896. This ward was later expanded in 1913 to include a dormitory for African American staff members. It was further expanded upon in the 1920s and 1930s when separate buildings for administration, patient intake, and laundry were dedicated. In 1910, the original building's male wing was expanded to keep up with increased demand, and in 1927 a new dining wing and auditorium were built onto the rear. In 1932, the Polk Building was constructed with eight wards. In 1942, this building was expanded to add an additional eight wards for women and adolescents. In 1948, the original hospital building was demolished and replaced with a new three-story building named Luton Hall.

Until the 1980s, patients were allowed to roam the grounds freely, occasionally leading to an escape. The advent of modern psychotropic medications and outlawing of unpaid patient labor aided in combating the overcrowding at Western State. Today, Western State serves around 2,500 patients across 24 counties, although only 250-300 of them reside on campus. Many of the historic buildings remain vacant and in disrepair. With a staff of 650 and an annual budget of approximately $35 million, Western State is the largest employer in Hardeman County.

== Notable patients ==
- Alice Mitchell, convicted murderer from Memphis. Died at Western State in 1898, age 25.
