= Snider Hall =

- U.S. National Register of Historic Places
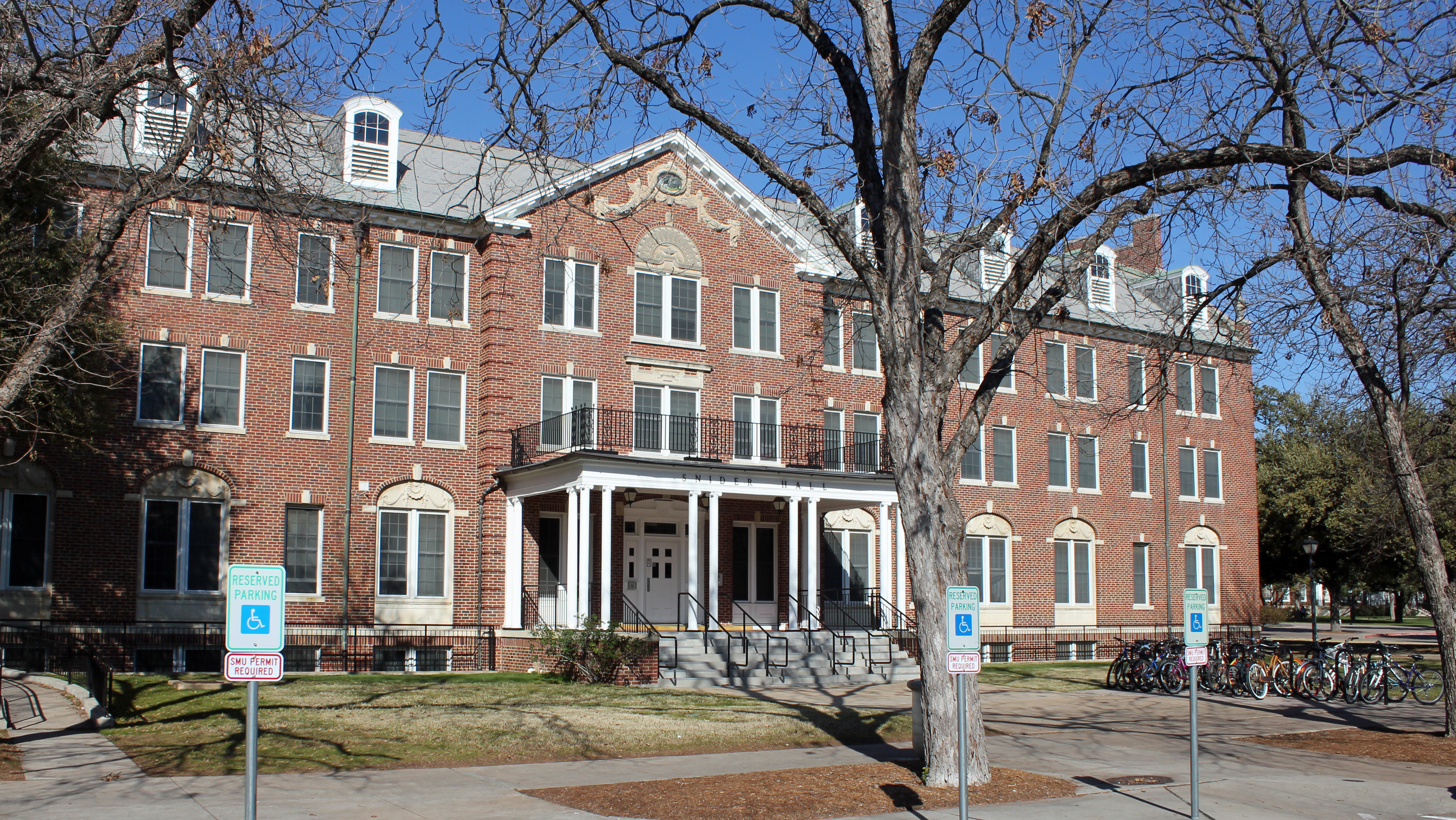
- Snider Hall in 2012

- Location within Texas Location within the United States
- Location: 3305 Dyer St., University Park, Texas
- Coordinates: 32°50′33″N 96°47′9″W
- Area: less than one acre
- Built: 1927
- Architect: Wyatt C. Hedrick
- Architectural style: Colonial Revival, Georgian Revival
- MPS: Georgian Revival Buildings of Southern Methodist University TR (AD)
- NRHP reference No.: 80004096
- Added to NRHP: September 27, 1980

Snider Hall is a historic building on the campus of Southern Methodist University in University Park, Texas, U.S.. It was built in 1927, and designed by Wyatt C. Hedrick in the Georgian Revival architectural style. It has been listed on the National Register of Historic Places since September 27, 1980.

It has three-part Palladian-type facades.

== See also ==
- National Register of Historic Places listings in Dallas County, Texas
