= Fort Worth Elks Lodge 124 =

- U.S. National Register of Historic Places
- Recorded Texas Historic Landmark
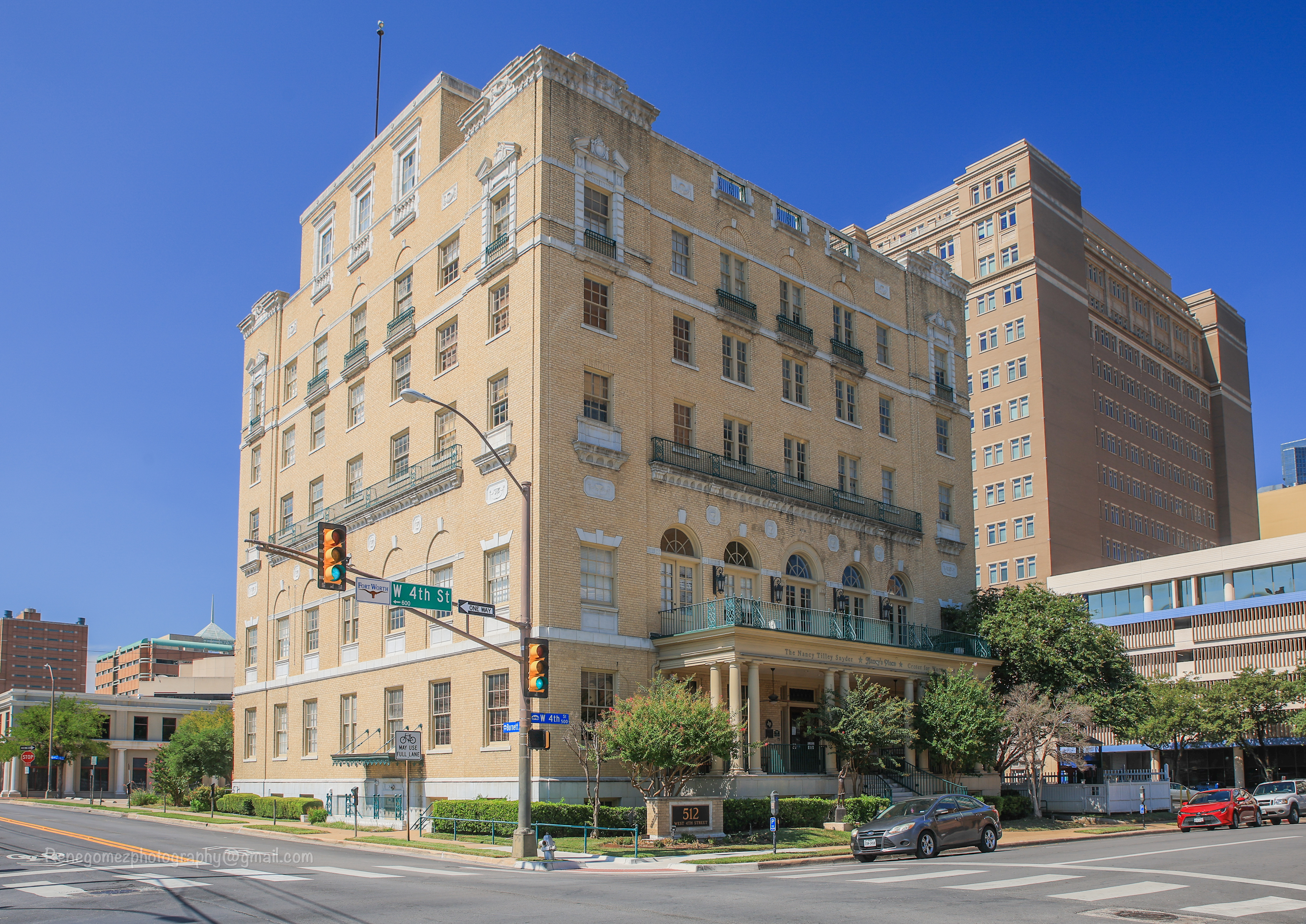
- Elks Lodge in 2024

- Location within Texas Location within the United States
- Location: 512 W. 4th St., Fort Worth, Texas
- Coordinates: 32°45′10″N 97°20′5″W
- Area: less than one acre
- Built: 1927-1928
- Built by: Thomas C. Burne, Inc.
- Architect: Wyatt C. Hedrick
- Architectural style: Colonial Revival, Georgian Revival
- NRHP reference No.: 84001969
- RTHL No.: 2027

Significant dates
- Added to NRHP: February 16, 1984
- Designated RTHL: 1986

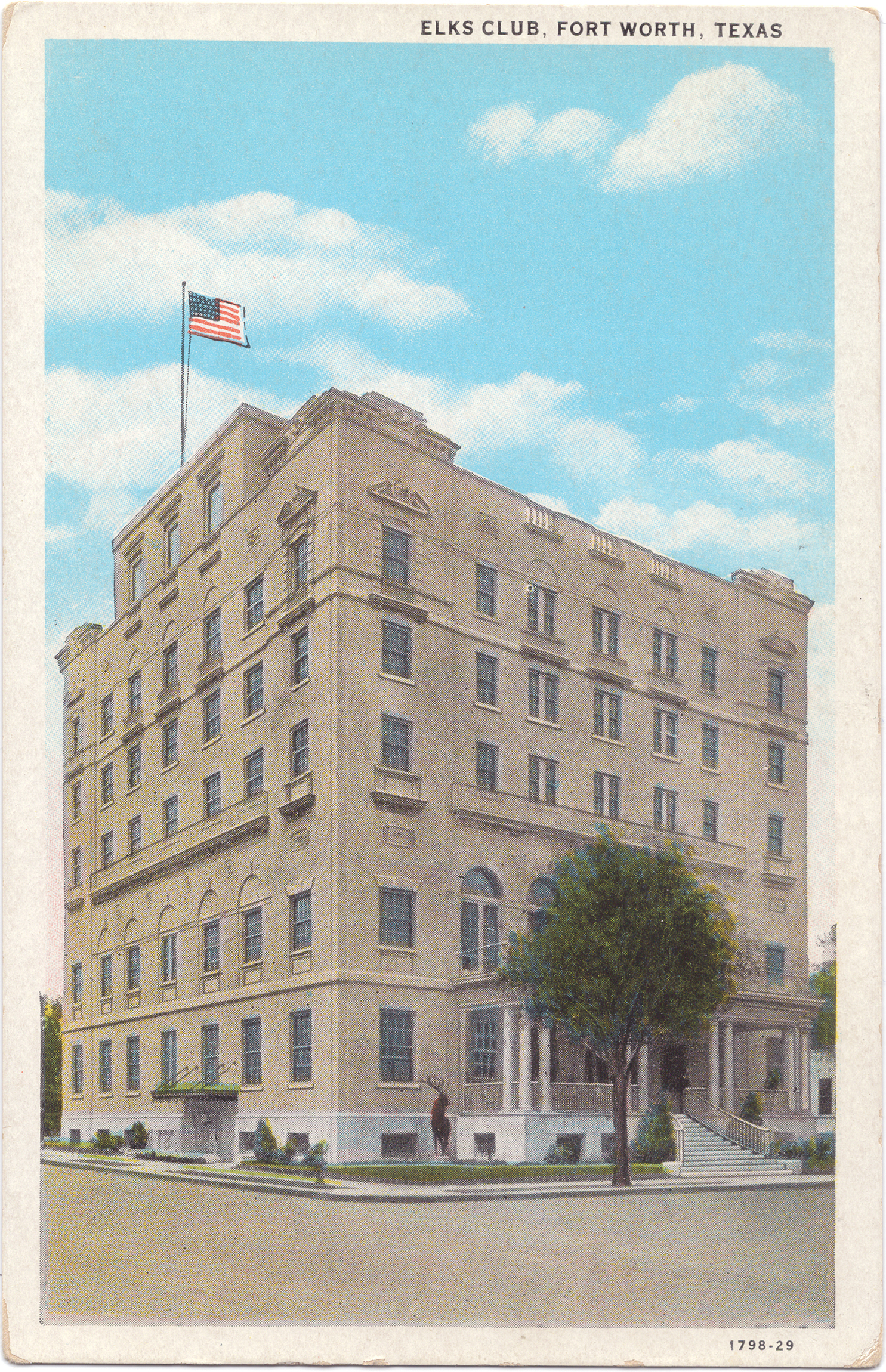
Postcard of Fort Worth Elks Lodge 124, undated

The Fort Worth Elks Lodge 124, also known as Benevolent and Protective Order of Elks, is an organization founded in 1901, and it is also the name of its five-story building with elements of Georgian Revival architecture and of Spanish Revival architecture that was built during 1927 and 1928. It was purchased by the YWCA of Fort Worth and Tarrant County in 1954.

It was listed on the National Register of Historic Places in 1984.

== See also ==
- National Register of Historic Places listings in Tarrant County, Texas
- Recorded Texas Historic Landmarks in Tarrant County
