= First National Bank Building (Fort Worth, Texas) =

- U.S. National Register of Historic Places
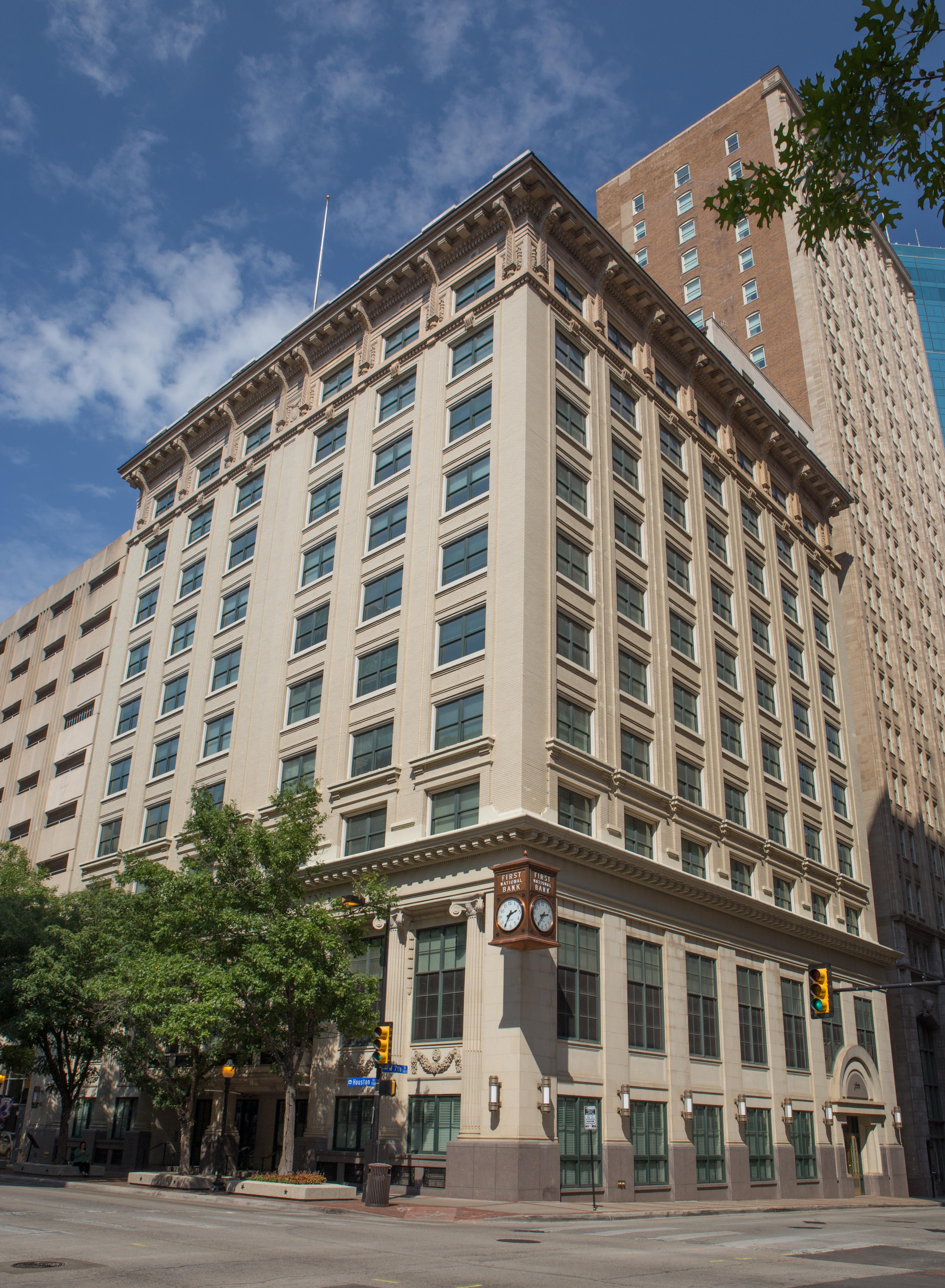
- First National Bank Building in 2022

- Location within Texas Location within the United States
- Location: 711 Houston St., Fort Worth, Texas
- Coordinates: 32°45′9″N 97°19′50″W
- Area: less than one acre
- Built: 1910
- Architect: Sanguinet & Staats, Wyatt C. Hedrick
- Architectural style: Skyscraper
- NRHP reference No.: 09000981
- Added to NRHP: December 3, 2009

First National Bank Building, at 711 Houston St. in Fort Worth, Texas, was built in 1910. It was designed by Sanguinet & Staats with Wyatt C. Hedrick. It has also been known as Baker Building and as Bob R. Simpson Building.

It is an 11-story three-part vertical commercial block skyscraper building. It was designed by Fort Worth-based Sanguinet & Staats and built in 1910 with width of three bays upon Houston Street and seven bays upon Seventh Street. It was expanded to seven bays wide on Houston in 1926, following designs of Wyatt C. Hedrick.

Its design includes elements of Beaux-Arts style, in its architectural ornamentation.

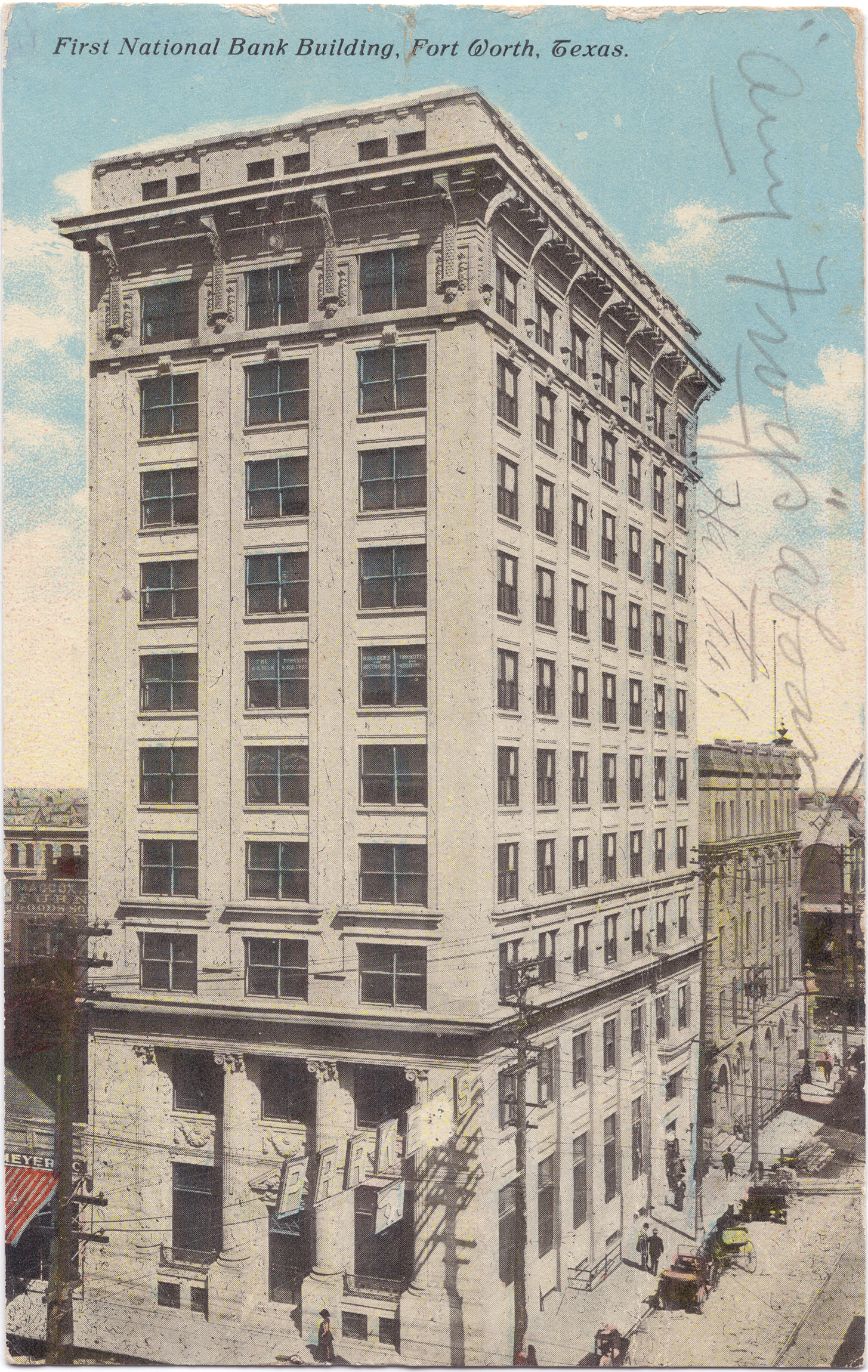
Postcard of the First National Bank Building, 1910

== See also ==
- National Register of Historic Places listings in Tarrant County, Texas
