= United States Post Office (Fort Worth, Texas) =

- U.S. National Register of Historic Places
- Recorded Texas Historic Landmark
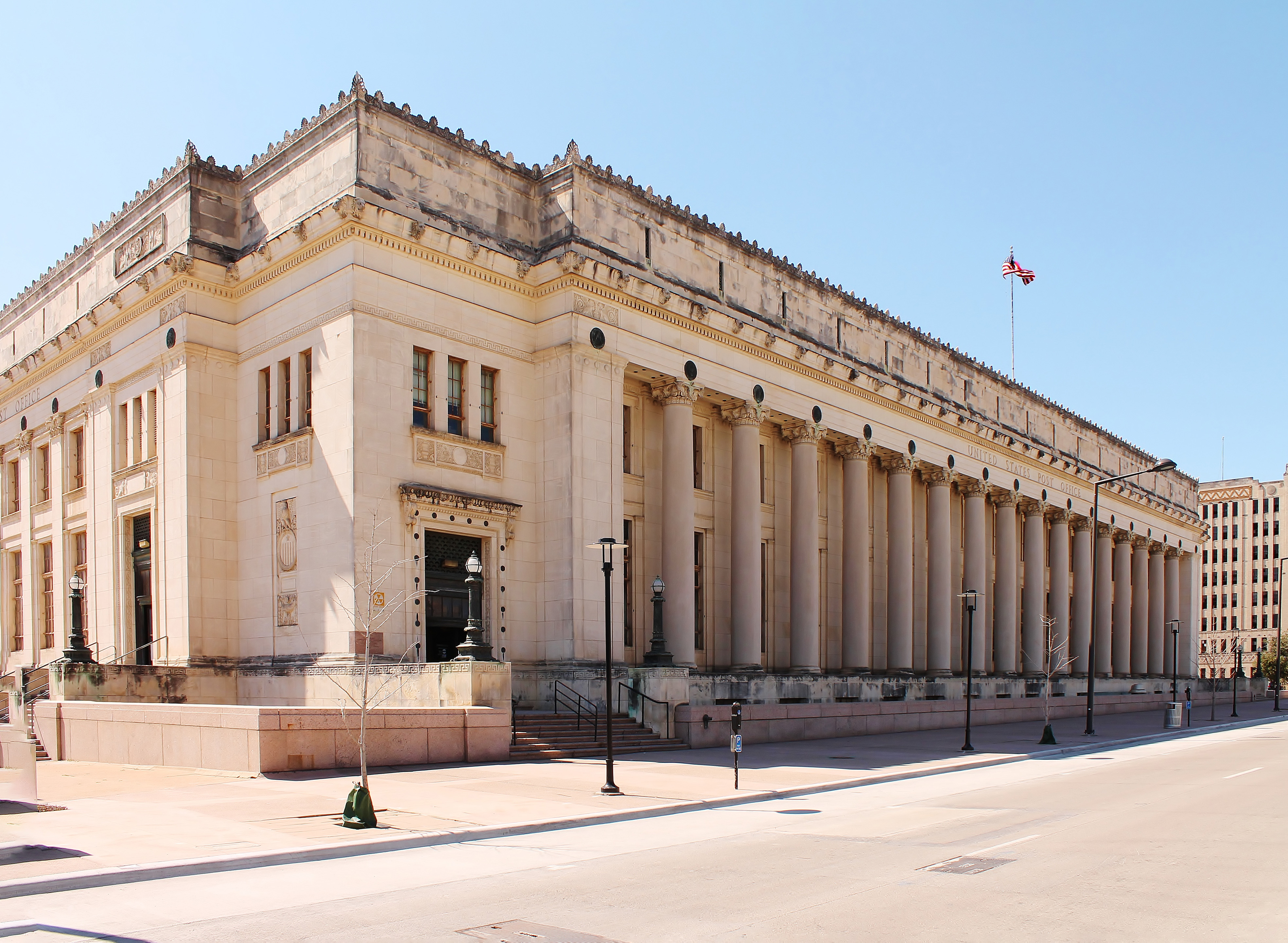
- Post Office in 2014

- Location within Texas Location within the United States
- Interactive map showing the location for the old US Post Office in Fort Worth
- Location: 251 W. Lancaster Ave., Fort Worth, Texas
- Coordinates: 32°44′47″N 97°19′46″W
- Area: 3 acres (1.2 ha)
- Built: 1931
- Architect: Wyatt C. Hedrick
- Architectural style: Classical Revival, Beaux Arts
- NRHP reference No.: 84001998
- RTHL No.: 2030

Significant dates
- Added to NRHP: April 15, 1985
- Designated RTHL: 1980

United States Post Office is located on 251 W. Lancaster Avenue in Fort Worth, Texas. Designed by Wyatt C. Hedrick, the building opened on February 22, 1933. Composed of Cordova limestone, the three-story rectangular building was designed in the Beaux Arts style. In 2014, the building was placed on the "Most Endangered Places" list by Historic Fort Worth, Inc. The building was added to the National Register 1985.

The building contains New Deal murals commissioned by the Public Works of Art Project in 1934, created by Fort Worth artists Dwight Clay Holmes and William Henry Baker.

== See also ==
- National Register of Historic Places listings in Tarrant County, Texas
- Recorded Texas Historic Landmarks in Tarrant County
