= Neil P. Anderson Building =

- U.S. National Register of Historic Places
- Recorded Texas Historic Landmark
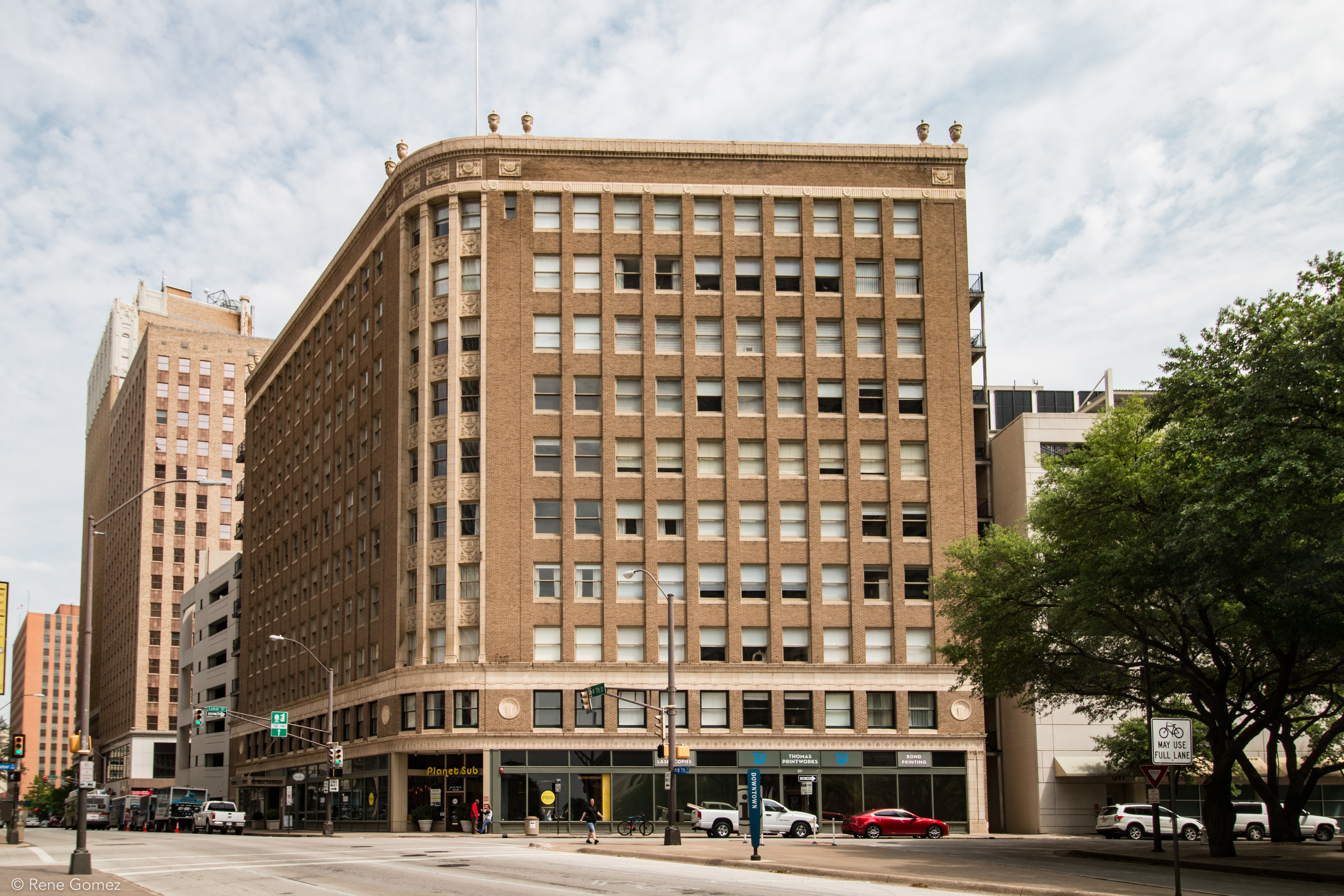
- Neil P. Anderson Building in 2018

- Location within Texas Location within the United States
- Location: 411 W. 7th St., Fort Worth, Texas
- Coordinates: 32°45′3″N 97°19′56″W
- Area: less than one acre
- Built: 1921
- Built by: W.C. Hedrick Construction
- Architect: Sanguinet & Staats
- Architectural style: Chicago
- NRHP reference No.: 78002981
- RTHL No.: 3569

Significant dates
- Added to NRHP: March 8, 1978
- Designated RTHL: 1978

The Neil P. Anderson Building is an 11-story building located at 411 West Seventh Street in Fort Worth, Texas. Built in 1921, it had served as a cotton exchange for the Neil P. Anderson Cotton Co. The building was designed by Sanguinet & Staats. In 1977, an insurance company which owned the building planned to demolish it. In the last minute a group of investors purchased the building in order to save it. It was added to the National Register on March 8, 1978. The Trammel Crow Co. purchased the building in 2000. In 2004, the building was converted into luxury condos. It was renamed the Neil P. at Burnett Park.

== Photo gallery ==
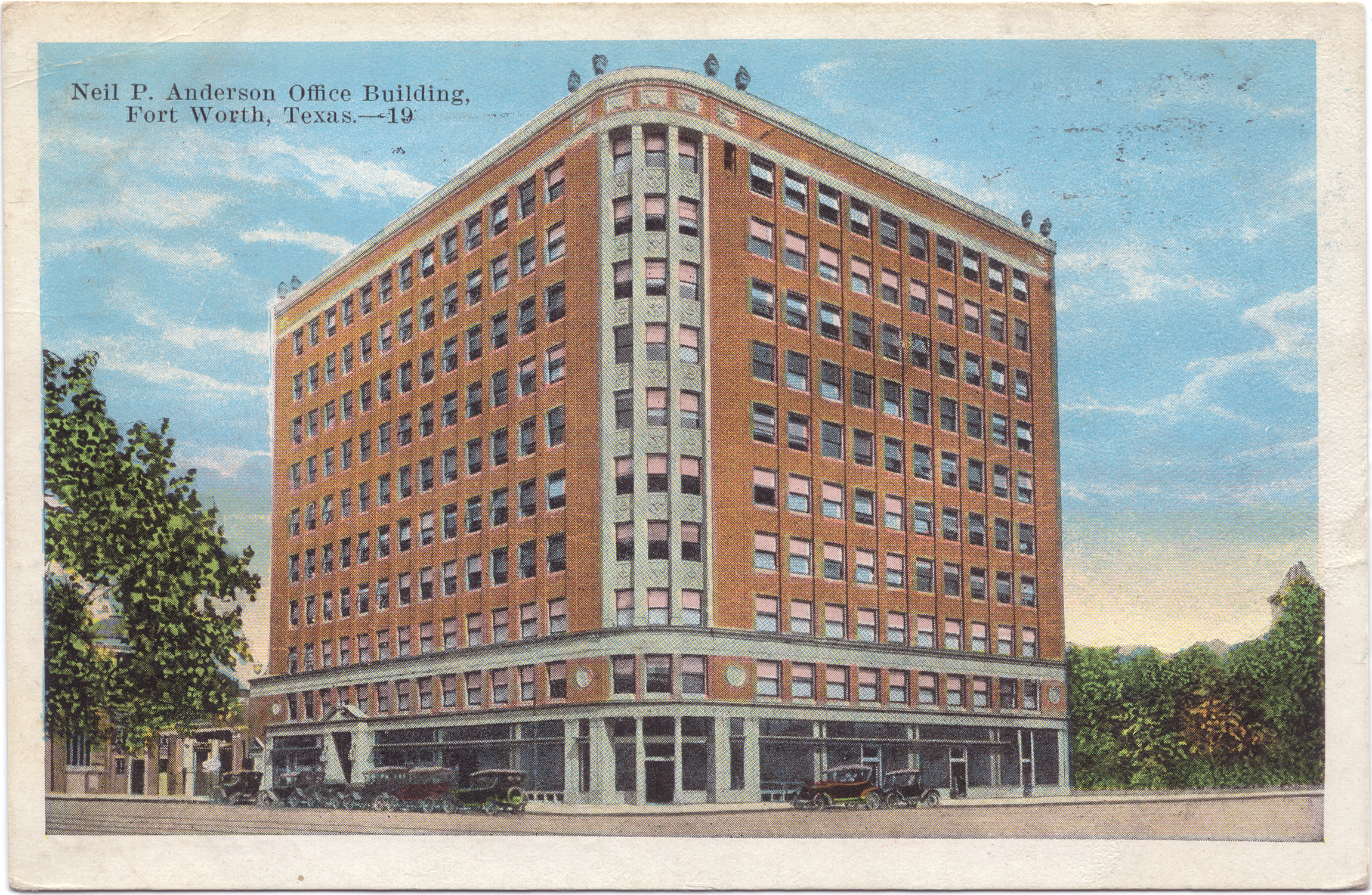
Postcard of the Neil P. Anderson Building, 1927

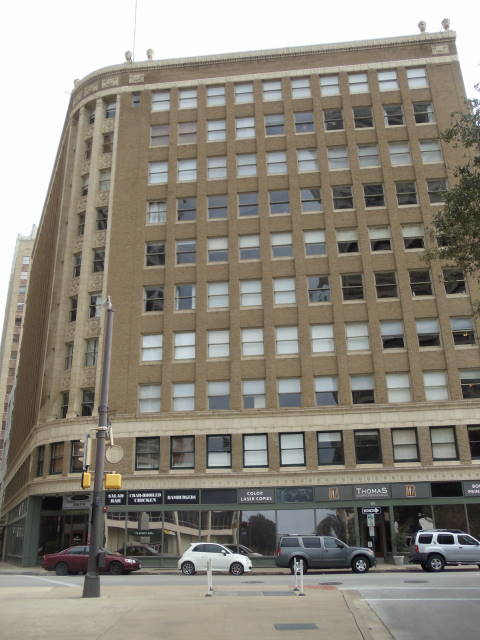

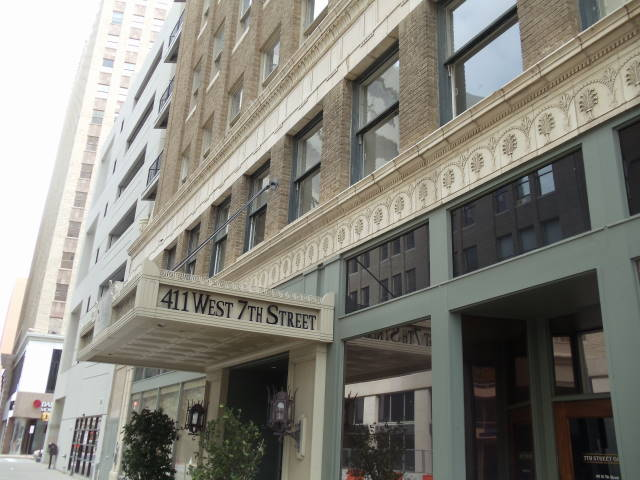

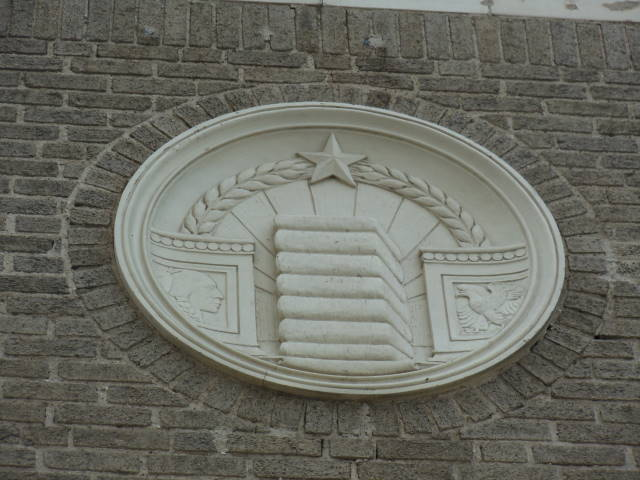

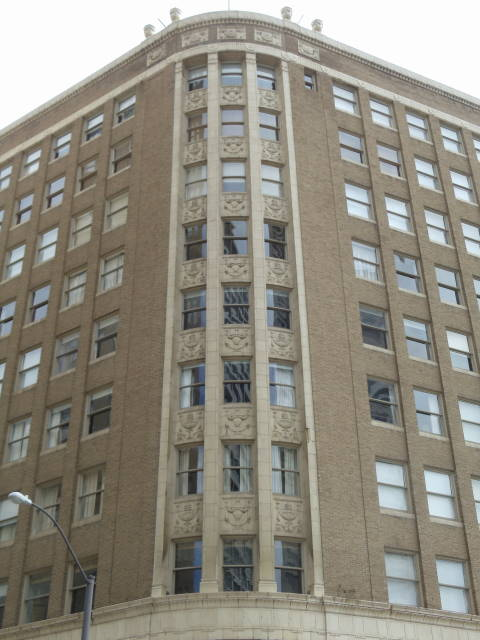

== See also ==
- National Register of Historic Places listings in Tarrant County, Texas
- Recorded Texas Historic Landmarks in Tarrant County
