= St. Mary of the Assumption Church (Fort Worth) =

Historic church in Texas, United States

- U.S. National Register of Historic Places
- Recorded Texas Historic Landmark
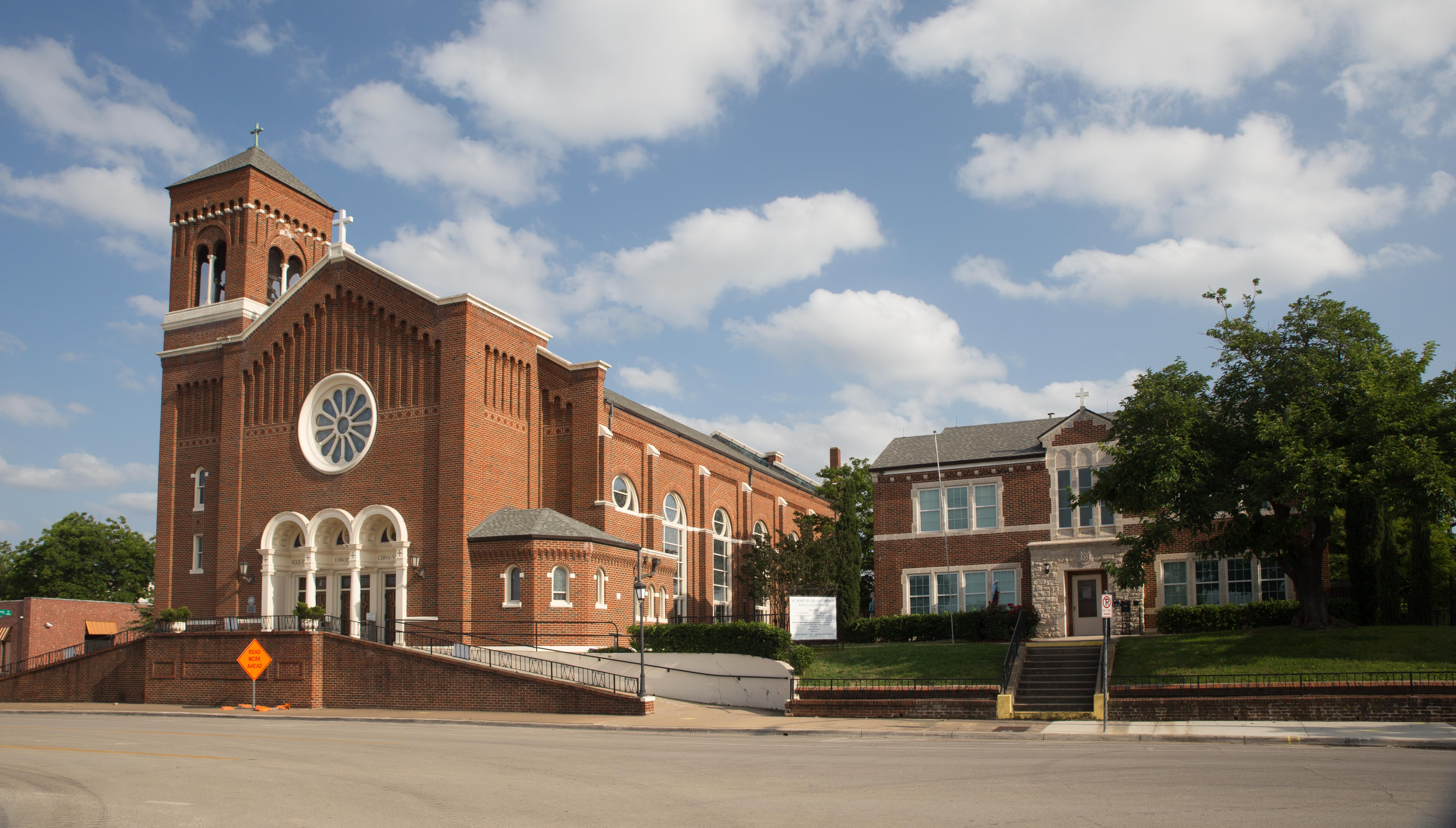
- St. Mary of the Assumption Church in 2019

- Location within Texas Location within the United States
- Location: 501 W. Magnolia Ave., Fort Worth, Texas
- Coordinates: 32°43′49″N 97°19′48″W
- Area: less than one acre
- Built: 1923
- Architect: Sanguinet, Staats & Hedrick
- Architectural style: Romanesque, Romanesque Revival
- Website: stmarysftw.org
- NRHP reference No.: 84001998
- RTHL No.: 4464

Significant dates
- Added to NRHP: May 10, 1984
- Designated RTHL: 1979

St. Mary of the Assumption Church is a historic church on 501 W. Magnolia Avenue in Fort Worth, Texas. The structure was designed by the firm Sanguinet, Staats and Hedrick. The first mass was held on July 20, 1924. The church was added to the National Register on May 10, 1984.

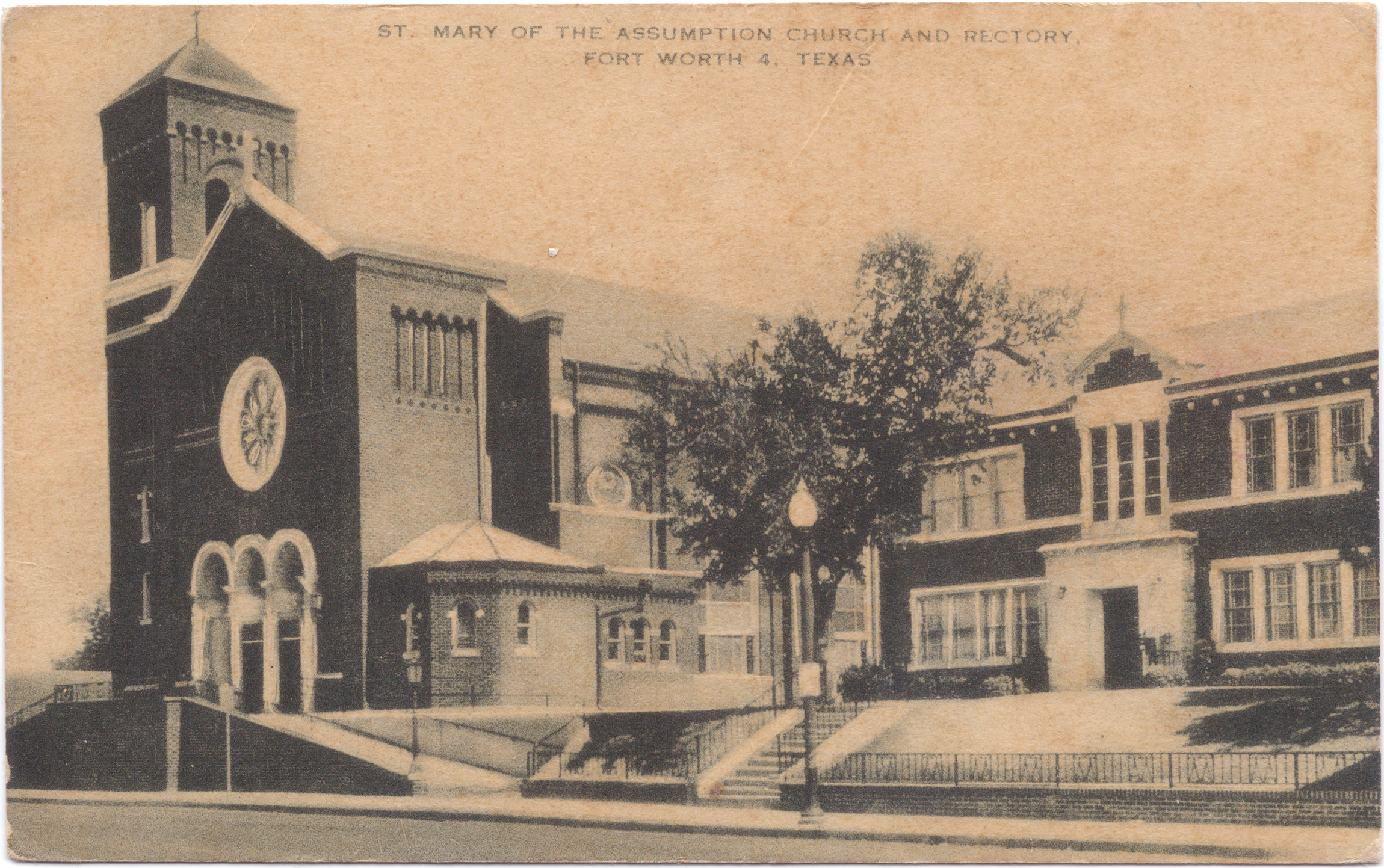
Postcard of St. Mary of the Assumption, undated

== See also ==
- National Register of Historic Places listings in Tarrant County, Texas
- Recorded Texas Historic Landmarks in Tarrant County
