= Buck Oaks Farm =

- Formerly listed on the U.S. National Register of Historic Places
- Location within Texas Location within the United States
- Location: 6312 White Settlement Rd., Westworth Village, Texas
- Coordinates: 32°45′34″N 97°25′30″W
- Area: less than one acre
- Built: 1932
- Architect: Earl T. Glasgow
- Architectural style: Colonial Revival
- NRHP reference No.: 87000995

Significant dates
- Added to NRHP: July 6, 1987
- Removed from NRHP: May 28, 2004

The Buck Oaks Farm is a historic place founded in 1932 located in Westworth Village, Texas. The house had Colonial Revival styling. It was designed by Earl T. Glasgow, an architect who also designed the Jermyn School and schools in the Fort Worth area.

The house on the property incorporated portions of an older log cabin which was moved, perhaps the c.1870 original cabin built by Elijah Farmer.

It was listed on the National Register of Historic Places on July 6, 1987. It was removed from the National Register on May 28, 2004. Structures may be removed from the National Register if they have been demolished or otherwise suffered loss of historic integrity.

The house was used for military housing after the property was absorbed into the Carswell Air Force Base in 1954.

== See also ==
- National Register of Historic Places listings in Tarrant County, Texas
