= National Register of Historic Places listings in Tarrant County, Texas =

Location of Tarrant County in Texas

This is a list of the National Register of Historic Places listings in Tarrant County, Texas.

This is intended to be a complete list of the properties and districts listed on the National Register of Historic Places in Tarrant County, Texas. There are 124 listings on the National Register in the county. Another two properties were once listed but have been removed while a third property has been relocated outside the county. One individually listed property is both a State Antiquities Landmark (SAL) and a Recorded Texas Historic Landmark (RTHL) while an additional property is an SAL. Two districts and 35 individual properties are RTHLs. One district contains additional SALs and RTHLs while six districts hold more RTHLs.

This National Park Service list is complete through NPS recent listings posted July 31, 2026.

== Current listings ==
The locations of National Register properties and districts may be seen in a mapping service provided.

	Name on the Register	Image	Date listed	Location	City or town	Description
1	Allen Chapel AME Church	Allen Chapel AME Church	October 18, 1984 (#84000169)	116 Elm St. 32°45′32″N 97°19′38″W	Fort Worth	Recorded Texas Historic Landmark
2	American Airways Hangar and Administration Building	American Airways Hangar and Administration Building	April 16, 2008 (#08000317)	201 Aviation Wy; 32°45′03″N 97°19′56″W	Fort Worth	
3	Neil P. Anderson Building	Neil P. Anderson Building	March 8, 1978 (#78002981)	411 W. 7th St. 32°45′03″N 97°19′56″W	Fort Worth	Recorded Texas Historic Landmark
4	Arlington Post Office	Arlington Post Office	March 9, 2000 (#00000188)	200 W. Main St. 32°44′10″N 97°06′30″W	Arlington	Historic and Architectural Resources of Arlington MRA
5	Armour Laboratory Building	Armour Laboratory Building	March 3, 2025 (#100011473)	601 E. Exchange Avenue; 32°47′20″N 97°20′38″W	Fort Worth	
6	Stephen F. Austin Elementary School	Stephen F. Austin Elementary School	March 10, 1983 (#83003160)	319 Lipscomb St. 32°44′28″N 97°19′57″W	Fort Worth	
7	Bedford School	Bedford School	August 14, 1997 (#97000851)	2400 School Ln; 32°50′46″N 97°08′26″W	Bedford	
8	M. A. Benton House	M. A. Benton House	May 22, 1978 (#78002982)	1730 6th Ave. 32°43′31″N 97°20′24″W	Fort Worth	Recorded Texas Historic Landmark; part of Fairmount-Southside Historic District
9	Binyon-O'Keefe Storage Company Building		August 5, 2026 (#100013301)	210 E. 7th Street; 32°45′12″N 97°19′43″W	Fort Worth	
10	Blackstone Hotel	Blackstone Hotel	February 2, 1984 (#84001961)	601 Main St. 32°45′13″N 97°19′48″W	Fort Worth	Recorded Texas Historic Landmark
11	Botts-Fowler House	Botts-Fowler House	July 1, 1999 (#99000723)	115 N. Fourth Ave. 32°33′55″N 97°08′45″W	Mansfield	
12	Andrew "Cap" and Emma Doughty Bratton House	Andrew "Cap" and Emma Doughty Bratton House	May 22, 2003 (#03000432)	310 E. Broad St. 32°33′46″N 97°08′19″W	Mansfield	Historic and Architectural Resources of Mansfield MPS
13	Bryce Building	Bryce Building	February 23, 1984 (#84001963)	909 Throckmorton St. 32°45′04″N 97°19′50″W	Fort Worth	Recorded Texas Historic Landmark
14	William J. Bryce House	William J. Bryce House	March 1, 1984 (#84001965)	4900 Bryce Ave. 32°44′23″N 97°23′35″W	Fort Worth	Recorded Texas Historic Landmark
15	Buchanan-Hayter-Witherspoon House	Buchanan-Hayter-Witherspoon House	May 22, 2003 (#03000433)	306 E. Broad St. 32°33′46″N 97°08′19″W	Mansfield	Historic and Architectural Resources of Mansfield MPS
16	Burk Burnett Building	Burk Burnett Building	November 12, 1980 (#80004151)	500-502 Main St. 32°45′15″N 97°19′51″W	Fort Worth	
17	Butler Place Historic District	Butler Place Historic District	August 4, 2011 (#11000514)	Roughly bounded by Luella St., I.M. Terrell Way Cir. M., 19th St. & I-35 West, 32°44′59″N 97°19′01″W	Fort Worth	
18	Central Handley Historic District	Central Handley Historic District	January 17, 2002 (#01001472)	Roughly bounded by E. Lancaster Ave., Forest Ave., Kerr St., and Handley Dr. 32°43′58″N 97°13′08″W	Fort Worth	
19	Lester H. and Mabel Bryant Chorn House	Lester H. and Mabel Bryant Chorn House	May 22, 2003 (#03000434)	303 E. Broad St. 32°33′48″N 97°08′21″W	Mansfield	Historic and Architectural Resources of Mansfield MPS
20	Lily B. Clayton Elementary School	Lily B. Clayton Elementary School	January 17, 2017 (#100000504)	2000 Park Place Ave; 32°43′34″N 97°20′56″W	Fort Worth	
21	W.I. Cook Memorial Hospital	W.I. Cook Memorial Hospital	May 1, 2024 (#100010262)	1212 West Lancaster Avenue; 32°44′48″N 97°20′22″W	Fort Worth	
22	Cotton Belt Railroad Industrial Historic District	Cotton Belt Railroad Industrial Historic District	September 4, 1997 (#97001109)	Along RR tracks, roughly bounded by Hudgins, Dooley, and Dallas Sts. 32°56′00″N 97°04′42″W	Grapevine	Historic and Architectural Resources of Grapevine MPS
23	Eddleman-McFarland House	Eddleman-McFarland House	October 18, 1979 (#79003009)	1110 Penn St. 32°44′50″N 97°20′33″W	Fort Worth	Recorded Texas Historic Landmark
24	Eighth Avenue Historic District	Eighth Avenue Historic District	November 21, 2006 (#06001065)	Bounded by 8th Ave., Pennsylvania Ave., 9th Ave., and Pruitt St. 32°44′24″N 97°20′39″W	Fort Worth	Includes Recorded Texas Historic Landmark
25	Electric Building	Electric Building	February 10, 1995 (#95000048)	410 W. 7th St. 32°45′05″N 97°19′58″W	Fort Worth	
26	Elizabeth Boulevard Historic District	Elizabeth Boulevard Historic District	November 16, 1979 (#79003010)	1001-1616 Elizabeth Blvd. 32°42′58″N 97°20′20″W	Fort Worth	
27	Fair Building	Fair Building	July 23, 2020 (#100005350)	307 West 7th St. 32°45′06″N 97°19′54″W	Fort Worth	
28	Fairmount-Southside Historic District	Fairmount-Southside Historic District	April 5, 1990 (#90000490); May 12, 1999 boundary increase (#99000565)	Roughly bounded by Magnolia, Hemphill, Eighth, and Jessamine; 32°43′30″N 97°20′15″W	Fort Worth	Includes Recorded Texas Historic Landmarks
29	Farmers and Mechanics National Bank	Farmers and Mechanics National Bank	December 4, 2012 (#12001004)	714 Main St. 32°45′10″N 97°19′49″W	Fort Worth	Now the main headquarters of XTO Energy
30	Farrington Field and Public Schools Gymnasium	Farrington Field and Public Schools Gymnasium	February 2, 2022 (#100007403)	1501 University Dr. and 1400 Foch St. 32°44′43″N 97°21′25″W	Fort Worth	
31	First Christian Church	First Christian Church	October 6, 1983 (#83003812)	612 Throckorton St. 32°45′09″N 97°19′57″W	Fort Worth	
32	First National Bank Building	First National Bank Building	December 3, 2009 (#09000981)	711 Houston St. 32°45′09″N 97°19′50″W	Fort Worth	
33	Flatiron Building	Flatiron Building	March 31, 1971 (#71000964)	1000 Houston St. 32°45′01″N 97°19′46″W	Fort Worth	Recorded Texas Historic Landmark
34	Fort Worth Botanic Garden	Fort Worth Botanic Garden	January 29, 2009 (#08001400)	3220 Botanic Garden Blvd. 32°44′26″N 97°21′46″W	Fort Worth	
35	Fort Worth Club Building – 1916	Fort Worth Club Building – 1916	February 12, 1998 (#98000102)	608-610 Main St. 32°45′12″N 97°19′51″W	Fort Worth	
36	Fort Worth Elks Lodge 124	Fort Worth Elks Lodge 124	February 16, 1984 (#84001969)	512 W. 4th St. 32°45′10″N 97°20′05″W	Fort Worth	Recorded Texas Historic Landmark
37	Fort Worth High School	Fort Worth High School	December 12, 2002 (#02001515)	1015 S. Jennings Ave. 32°44′08″N 97°19′46″W	Fort Worth	
38	Fort Worth National Bank	Fort Worth National Bank	September 9, 2022 (#100008197)	115 West 7th St. 32°45′09″N 97°19′49″W	Fort Worth	
39	Fort Worth Public Market	Fort Worth Public Market	January 5, 1984 (#84001981)	1400 Henderson St. 32°44′39″N 97°20′16″W	Fort Worth	Recorded Texas Historic Landmark
40	Fort Worth Recreation Building	Fort Worth Recreation Building	June 13, 2014 (#14000343)	215 West Vickery Boulevard; 32°44′36″N 97°19′39″W	Fort Worth	
41	Fort Worth Stockyards Historic District	Fort Worth Stockyards Historic District	June 29, 1976 (#76002067)	Roughly bounded by 23rd, Houston, and 28th Sts., and railroad 32°47′25″N 97°20′46″W	Fort Worth	Includes State Antiquities Landmarks, Recorded Texas Historic Landmark
42	Fort Worth US Courthouse	Fort Worth US Courthouse	April 25, 2001 (#01000437)	501 W. 10th St. 32°44′56″N 97°20′02″W	Fort Worth	
43	Fort Worth Warehouse and Transfer Company Building	Fort Worth Warehouse and Transfer Company Building	March 27, 2013 (#13000126)	201 S. Calhoun St. 32°44′33″N 97°19′25″W	Fort Worth	
44	Fortune Arms Apartments	Fortune Arms Apartments	June 7, 2016 (#16000353)	601 W. 1st St. 32°45′15″N 97°20′11″W	Fort Worth	
45	Eldred W. Foster House	Eldred W. Foster House	August 28, 2012 (#12000589)	9608 Heron Dr. 32°47′43″N 97°29′10″W	Fort Worth	
46	Grand Avenue Historic District	Grand Avenue Historic District	March 1, 1990 (#90000337)	Roughly Grand Ave. from Northside to Park; 32°46′20″N 97°21′38″W	Fort Worth	
47	Grapevine Commercial Historic District	Grapevine Commercial Historic District	March 9, 1992 (#92000097); May 16, 1997 boundary increase (#97000444); December 19, 2002 boundary increase (#02001569)	300-530 S. Main St. 32°56′12″N 97°04′43″W	Grapevine	Includes Recorded Texas Historic Landmark; Historic and Architectural Resources of Grapevine MPS
48	James E. Guinn School	James E. Guinn School	May 12, 1998 (#98000429)	1200 South Freeway; 32°43′54″N 97°19′15″W	Fort Worth	
49	Gulf, Colorado and Santa Fe Railroad Passenger Station	Gulf, Colorado and Santa Fe Railroad Passenger Station	October 15, 1970 (#70000760)	1601 Jones St. 32°44′57″N 97°19′26″W	Fort Worth	Recorded Texas Historic Landmark
50	Hamilton Apartments	Hamilton Apartments	August 29, 2018 (#100002850)	2837 Hemphill St. 32°42′36″N 97°19′53″W	Fort Worth	
51	Henderson Street Bridge	Henderson Street Bridge	March 21, 2011 (#11000128)	Henderson Street at the Clear Fork of the Trinity River; 32°45′29″N 97°20′32″W	Fort Worth	Historic Bridges of Texas, 1866-1945 MPS
52	Heritage Park Plaza	Heritage Park Plaza	May 10, 2010 (#10000253)	W Bluff St at Main St; 32°45′29″N 97°20′04″W	Fort Worth	
53	Alexander Hogg School	Alexander Hogg School	December 12, 2002 (#02001512)	900 St. Louis Ave. 32°44′13″N 97°19′43″W	Fort Worth	
54	Hotel Texas	Hotel Texas	July 3, 1979 (#79003011); November 26, 2014 boundary increase (#14000966)	815 Main St. and 815 Commerece St. 32°45′09″N 97°19′45″W	Fort Worth	Recorded Texas Historic Landmark
55	Hutcheson-Smith House	Hutcheson-Smith House	August 2, 1984 (#84001993)	312 N. Oak St. 32°44′24″N 97°06′33″W	Arlington	Recorded Texas Historic Landmark; part of Old Town Historic District
56	Inspiration Point Shelter House	Inspiration Point Shelter House	March 31, 2014 (#14000105)	Roughly 250 yds. S. of 2400 blk. of Roberts Cut Off Rd. 32°47′41″N 97°24′36″W	Fort Worth	
57	Jennings-Vickery Historic District	Jennings-Vickery Historic District	February 21, 2017 (#100000674)	Roughly bounded by W. Vickery Blvd., St. Louis & W. Daggett Aves., Hemphill St. & Jennings Ave. underpass 32°44′35″N 97°20′02″W	Fort Worth	
58	Johnson-Elliott House	Johnson-Elliott House	May 10, 1984 (#84001996)	3 Chase Ct. 32°43′31″N 97°19′54″W	Fort Worth	Recorded Texas Historic Landmark; part of Fairmount-Southside Historic District
59	Katy Freight Depot	Katy Freight Depot	February 7, 2020 (#100004969)	100 South Jones St. 32°42′10″N 97°19′24″W	Fort Worth	
60	Knights of Pythias Building	Knights of Pythias Building	April 28, 1970 (#70000761)	315 Main St. 32°45′19″N 97°19′52″W	Fort Worth	Recorded Texas Historic Landmark
61	Elizabeth and Jack Knight House	Elizabeth and Jack Knight House	May 17, 2021 (#100006521)	2811 Simondale Dr. 32°42′39″N 97°22′19″W	Fort Worth	
62	Kress Building	Kress Building	April 4, 2007 (#07000266)	604 Main St. 32°45′12″N 97°19′52″W	Fort Worth	
63	Leuda-May Historic District	Leuda-May Historic District	March 30, 2005 (#05000240)	301-311 W. Leuda and 805-807 May Sts. 32°44′14″N 97°19′44″W	Fort Worth	
64	Ralph Sandiford and Julia Boisseau Man House	Ralph Sandiford and Julia Boisseau Man House	May 22, 2003 (#03000435)	604 W. Broad St. 32°33′55″N 97°08′57″W	Mansfield	Historic and Architectural Resources of Mansfield MPS
65	Marine Commercial Historic District	Marine Commercial Historic District	February 9, 2001 (#01000102)	Roughly defined by N. Main St., bet. N. Side Dr. and N. 14th St. 32°46′39″N 97°20′46″W	Fort Worth	
66	Markeen Apartments	Markeen Apartments	May 2, 2001 (#01000470)	210-14 St. Louis Ave. and 406-10 W. Daggett Ave. 32°44′31″N 97°19′41″W	Fort Worth	Part of Jennings-Vickery Historic District
67	Marrow Bone Spring Archeological Site	Marrow Bone Spring Archeological Site	November 21, 1978 (#78002980)	Vandergriff Park; 32°44′10″N 97°06′33″W	Arlington	
68	Masonic Widows and Orphans Home Historic District	Masonic Widows and Orphans Home Historic District	January 28, 1992 (#91002022)	Roughly bounded by E. Berry St., Mitchell Blvd., Vaughn St., Wichita St. and Glen Garden Dr; 32°42′33″N 97°17′00″W	Fort Worth	
69	Masonic Temple	Masonic Temple	June 19, 2017 (#100001227)	1100 Henderson St. 32°44′50″N 97°20′18″W	Fort Worth	Recorded Texas Historic Landmark
70	Miller Manufacturing Company Building	Miller Manufacturing Company Building	October 28, 2010 (#10000865)	311 Bryan Ave. 32°44′28″N 97°19′29″W	Fort Worth	
71	Montgomery Ward and Company Building	Montgomery Ward and Company Building	November 19, 1998 (#98001415)	801 Grove St. 32°45′14″N 97°19′34″W	Fort Worth	
72	Morning Chapel Colored Methodist Episcopal Church	Morning Chapel Colored Methodist Episcopal Church	August 27, 1999 (#99001049)	901 E. Third St. 32°45′30″N 97°19′32″W	Fort Worth	
73	Thomas J. and Elizabeth Nash Farm	Thomas J. and Elizabeth Nash Farm	October 28, 2010 (#10000866)	626 Ball St. 32°56′03″N 97°05′09″W	Grapevine	Recorded Texas Historic Landmark
74	Near Southeast Historic District	Near Southeast Historic District	April 26, 2002 (#02000405)	Roughly bounded by New York Ave., E. Terrell Ave., former I&GN Railway, Verbena St., and N side of E. Terrell Ave, 32°43′58″N 97°14′15″W	Fort Worth	Includes Recorded Texas Historic Landmark
75	North Fort Worth High School	North Fort Worth High School	February 2, 1995 (#94001627)	600 Park St. 32°46′52″N 97°21′24″W	Fort Worth	
76	Oakhurst Historic District	Oakhurst Historic District	February 24, 2010 (#10000051)	Roughly bounded by Yucca Ave., Sylvania Ave., Watauga Ave., and Oakhurst Scenic Dr. 32°47′08″N 97°18′48″W	Fort Worth	Historic Residential Suburbs in the United States, 1830-1960 MPS
77	Oakwood Cemetery Historic District	Oakwood Cemetery Historic District	May 29, 2018 (#100002473)	701 Grand Ave. 32°46′10″N 97°20′55″W	Fort Worth	Recorded Texas Historic Landmark and includes another
78	Oil & Gas Building	Oil & Gas Building	January 25, 2024 (#100009864)	309 W. 7th Street; 32°45′06″N 97°19′54″W	Fort Worth	
79	Old Town Historic District	Old Town Historic District	March 23, 2000 (#00000247)	Roughly bounded by Sanford, Elm, North, Prairie and Oak Sts. 32°44′27″N 97°06′05″W	Arlington	Includes Recorded Texas Historic Landmarks; Historic and Architectural Resources of Arlington MRA
80	Original Town Residential Historic District	Original Town Residential Historic District	July 10, 1998 (#98000736)	Roughly bounded by Texas, Austin, Hudgins and Jenkins Sts. 32°56′11″N 97°04′28″W	Grapevine	Historic and Architectural Resources of Grapevine MPS
81	Our Lady of Victory Academy	Our Lady of Victory Academy	August 20, 2004 (#04000886)	801 W. Shaw St. 32°42′11″N 97°19′59″W	Fort Worth	
82	Our Mother of Mercy Catholic Church and Parsonage	Our Mother of Mercy Catholic Church and Parsonage	July 22, 1999 (#99000882)	1100 and 1104 Evans Ave. 32°43′57″N 97°19′05″W	Fort Worth	Part of Near Southeast Historic District
83	Our Mother of Mercy School	Our Mother of Mercy School	June 15, 2006 (#06000510)	801 Verbena St. 32°44′06″N 97°19′08″W	Fort Worth	Part of Near Southeast Historic District
84	Fountain G. and Mary Oxsheer House	Fountain G. and Mary Oxsheer House	July 24, 2017 (#100001378)	1119 Pennsylvania Ave. 32°44′17″N 97°20′14″W	Fort Worth	
85	Paddock Viaduct	Paddock Viaduct	March 15, 1976 (#76002068)	Main St. 32°45′33″N 97°20′04″W	Fort Worth	State Antiquities Landmark
86	Parker-Browne Company Building	Parker-Browne Company Building	June 3, 2015 (#15000337)	1212 E. Lancaster Ave. 32°44′45″N 97°19′00″W	Fort Worth	
87	Petroleum Building	Petroleum Building	December 3, 2009 (#09000982)	210 W. 6th St. 32°45′10″N 97°19′54″W	Fort Worth	
88	Pioneers Rest Cemetery	Pioneers Rest Cemetery	January 27, 2021 (#100006072)	600 Samuels Ave. 32°45′56″N 97°19′43″W	Fort Worth	
89	Pollock-Capps House	Pollock-Capps House	June 19, 1972 (#72001372)	1120 Penn St. 32°44′49″N 97°20′33″W	Fort Worth	Recorded Texas Historic Landmark
90	Dr. Arvel and Faye Ponton House	Dr. Arvel and Faye Ponton House	November 29, 2006 (#06001085)	1208 Mistletoe Dr. 32°43′50″N 97°21′22″W	Fort Worth	Recorded Texas Historic Landmark
91	Ridglea Theatre	Ridglea Theatre	December 30, 2011 (#11000982)	6025-6033 Camp Bowie Rd. & 3309 Winthrop Ave. 32°43′44″N 97°24′52″W	Fort Worth	
92	Riverside Baptist Church	Riverside Baptist Church	September 23, 2020 (#100005603)	3111 Race St. 32°46′23″N 97°18′09″W	Fort Worth	
93	Riverside Public School	Riverside Public School	December 30, 1999 (#99001624)	2629 LaSalle St. 32°45′29″N 97°18′19″W	Fort Worth	
94	Will Rogers Memorial Center	Will Rogers Memorial Center	March 22, 2016 (#16000122)	3401 W. Lancaster Ave. 32°44′46″N 97°21′59″W	Fort Worth	
95	Rogers-O'Daniel House	Rogers-O'Daniel House	July 5, 1985 (#85001484)	2230 Warner Rd. 32°42′35″N 97°20′50″W	Fort Worth	Recorded Texas Historic Landmark
96	Saint James Second Street Baptist Church	Saint James Second Street Baptist Church	July 22, 1999 (#99000883)	210 Harding St. 32°45′34″N 97°19′28″W	Fort Worth	Recorded Texas Historic Landmark
97	St. Mary of the Assumption Church	St. Mary of the Assumption Church	May 10, 1984 (#84001998)	501 W. Magnolia Ave. 32°43′49″N 97°19′48″W	Fort Worth	Recorded Texas Historic Landmark
98	St. Patrick Cathedral Complex	St. Patrick Cathedral Complex	January 7, 1985 (#85000074)	1206 Throckmorton; 32°44′56″N 97°19′46″W	Fort Worth	Includes Recorded Texas Historic Landmarks
99	Sanger Brothers Building	Sanger Brothers Building	June 3, 1994 (#94000542)	410-412 Houston St. 32°45′15″N 97°19′55″W	Fort Worth	
100	Sanger Brothers Building	Sanger Brothers Building	December 10, 2014 (#14001035)	515 Houston St. 32°45′13″N 97°19′53″W	Fort Worth	
101	Marshall R. Sanguinet House	Marshall R. Sanguinet House	June 7, 1983 (#83003162)	4729 Collinwood Ave. 32°44′14″N 97°23′26″W	Fort Worth	Recorded Texas Historic Landmark
102	J.L. Sealy Building	J.L. Sealy Building	August 20, 2013 (#13000612)	801 S. Main St. 32°44′11″N 97°19′33″W	Fort Worth	
103	Shannon's Funeral Home	Shannon's Funeral Home	July 23, 2018 (#100002699)	2717 Ave. B 32°44′04″N 97°17′10″W	Fort Worth	
104	Thomas and Marjorie Shaw House	Thomas and Marjorie Shaw House	August 22, 1995 (#95001029)	2404 Medford Ct. E. 32°43′03″N 97°21′24″W	Fort Worth	Recorded Texas Historic Landmark
105	Sinclair Building	Sinclair Building	January 7, 1992 (#91001913)	512 Main St. 32°45′14″N 97°19′51″W	Fort Worth	Recorded Texas Historic Landmark
106	South Center Street Historic District	South Center Street Historic District	May 1, 2003 (#03000334)	500-600 blocks of S. Center St. 32°43′53″N 97°06′24″W	Arlington	
107	South Main St. Historic District	South Main St. Historic District	December 3, 2009 (#09000984)	104, 108, 126, & 200 blocks of S. Main St. 32°44′33″N 97°19′33″W	Fort Worth	
108	South Side Masonic Lodge No. 1114	South Side Masonic Lodge No. 1114	January 3, 1985 (#85000048)	1301 W. Magnolia; 32°43′48″N 97°20′16″W	Fort Worth	Part of Fairmount-Southside Historic District
109	Sycamore Creek Bridge	Sycamore Creek Bridge	February 19, 2026 (#100012723)	0.05 miles (0.080 km) e. of jct. US287/MLK Jr. Fwy. and E. Rosedale St. 32°43′52″N 97°17′50″W	Fort Worth	
110	Tabernacle Baptist Church	Tabernacle Baptist Church	November 30, 1999 (#99001451)	1801 Evans Ave. 32°43′29″N 97°19′03″W	Fort Worth	
111	Tarrant County Courthouse	Tarrant County Courthouse	October 15, 1970 (#70000762)	Bounded by Houston, Belknap, Weatherford, and Commerce Sts. 32°45′26″N 97°19′58″W	Fort Worth	State Antiquities Landmark, Recorded Texas Historic Landmark
112	Texas and Pacific Terminal Complex	Texas and Pacific Terminal Complex	May 26, 1978 (#78002983)	Lancaster and Throckmorton Sts. 32°44′45″N 97°19′43″W	Fort Worth	Recorded Texas Historic Landmark
113	Texas Garden Clubs, Inc., Headquarters	Texas Garden Clubs, Inc., Headquarters	March 21, 2011 (#11000136)	3111 Old Garden Rd. 32°44′09″N 97°21′52″W	Fort Worth	Recorded Texas Historic Landmark
114	US Post Office	US Post Office	April 15, 1985 (#85000855)	251 W. Lancaster Ave. 32°44′47″N 97°19′46″W	Fort Worth	Recorded Texas Historic Landmark
115	Van Zandt Cottage	Van Zandt Cottage	December 4, 2012 (#12001005)	2900 Crestline Rd. 32°44′39″N 97°21′32″W	Fort Worth	Recorded Texas Historic Landmark
116	Vandergriff Building	Vandergriff Building	July 26, 2010 (#10000500)	100 E Division St. 32°44′20″N 97°06′24″W	Arlington	
117	Vaught House	Vaught House	August 10, 2005 (#05000864)	718 W. Abram St. 32°44′06″N 97°06′56″W	Arlington	
118	W. T. Waggoner Building	W. T. Waggoner Building	July 10, 1979 (#79003012)	810 Houston St. 32°45′05″N 97°19′49″W	Fort Worth	
119	Wallace-Hall House	Wallace-Hall House	May 22, 2003 (#03000436)	210 S. Main St. 32°33′42″N 97°08′32″W	Mansfield	Historic and Architectural Resources of Mansfield MPS
120	Roy A. and Gladys Westbrook House	Roy A. and Gladys Westbrook House	January 8, 2009 (#08001300)	2232 Winton Terrace W. 32°43′15″N 97°21′35″W	Fort Worth	Recorded Texas Historic Landmark
121	Westover Manor	Westover Manor	December 15, 1988 (#88002709)	8 Westover Rd. 32°44′31″N 97°24′14″W	Westover Hills	Recorded Texas Historic Landmark
122	Wharton-Scott House	Wharton-Scott House	April 14, 1975 (#75002003)	1509 Pennsylvania Ave. 32°44′16″N 97°20′32″W	Fort Worth	Recorded Texas Historic Landmark
123	The Woman's Club of Fort Worth	The Woman's Club of Fort Worth	April 10, 2017 (#100000862)	N. side, 1300 blk. Pennsylvania Ave. 32°26′31″N 97°12′09″W	Fort Worth	Includes Recorded Texas Historic Landmarks
124	F. W. Woolworth Building	F. W. Woolworth Building	November 25, 1994 (#94001359)	501 Houston St. 32°45′12″N 97°19′52″W	Fort Worth	

== Former listings ==
	Name on the Register	Image	Date listed	Date removed	Location	City or town	Description
1	Buck Oaks Farm		July 6, 1987 (#87000995)	May 28, 2004	6312 White Settlement Road; 32°45′34″N 97°25′29″W	Westworth	
2	M. G. Ellis School		May 28, 1983 (#83003161)	May 28, 1986	213 NE. 14th St. 32°46′51″N 97°20′49″W	Fort Worth	Destroyed by fire on January 28, 1986.
3	Texas & Pacific Steam Locomotive No. 610	Texas & Pacific Steam Locomotive No. 610	March 25, 1977 (#77001477)	None	Park Road 70; 31°44′28″N 95°34′16″W	Palestine	Relocated to the Texas State Railroad in Palestine, Texas.

== See also ==
- National Register of Historic Places listings in Texas
- List of Recorded Texas Historic Landmarks (Sabine-Travis) § Tarrant County
