= Elizabeth Boulevard Historic District =

Historic district in Texas, United States

- U.S. National Register of Historic Places
- U.S. Historic district
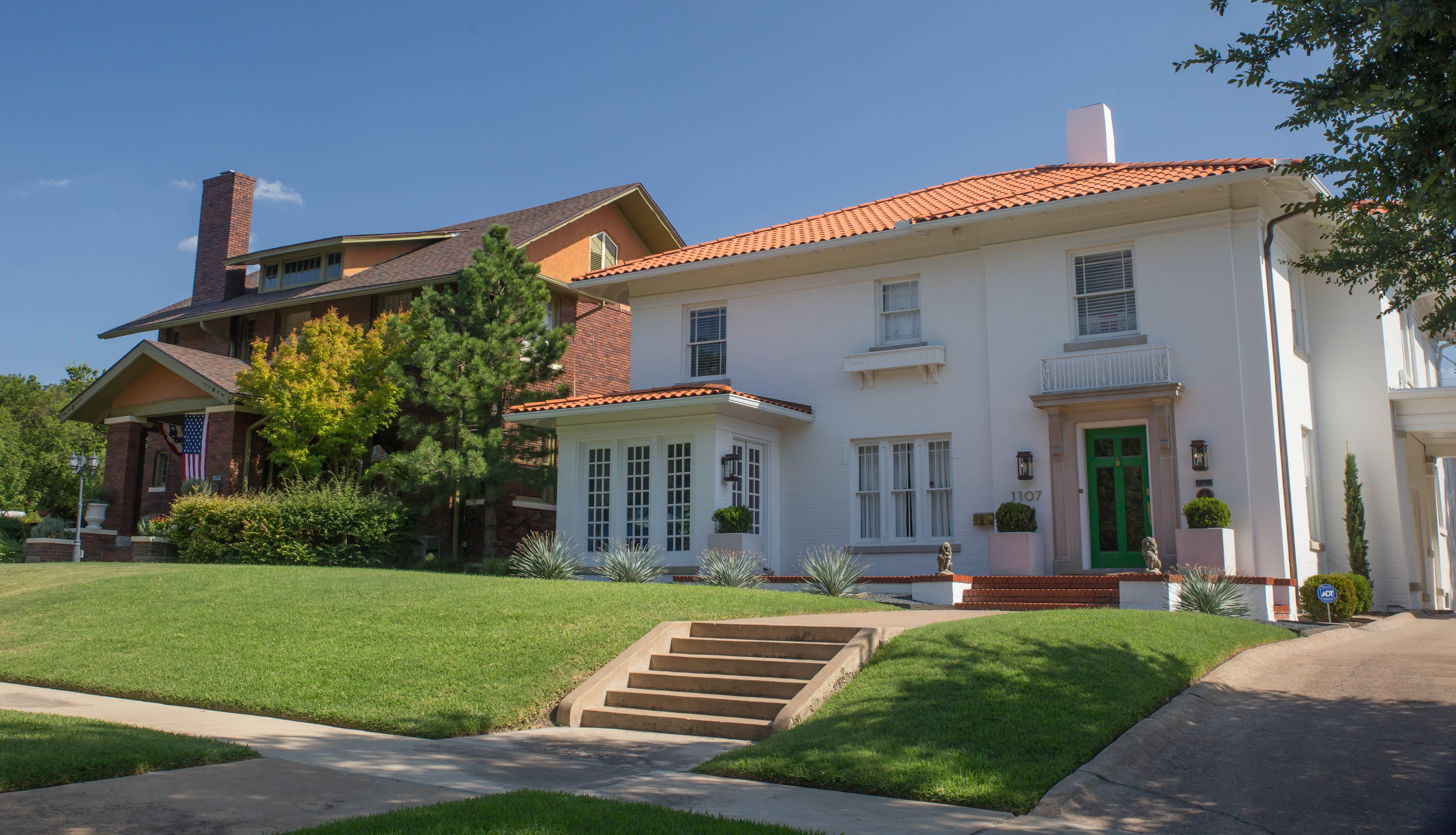
- Elizabeth Blvd. in 2011

- Location within Texas Location within the United States
- Location: 1001-1616 Elizabeth Blvd., Fort Worth, Texas
- Coordinates: 32°45′32″N 97°19′38″W
- Area: 26 acres (11 ha)
- Built: 1911
- Architect: John C. Ryan
- Architectural style: Colonial Revival, Prairie School, Mission/Spanish Revival
- NRHP reference No.: 79003010
- Added to NRHP: November 16, 1979

Elizabeth Boulevard Historic District is located in the southern part of Fort Worth, Texas.

It was added to the National Register in November 16, 1979.

== See also ==
- National Register of Historic Places listings in Tarrant County, Texas
