= Markeen Apartments =

- U.S. National Register of Historic Places
- U.S. Historic district – Contributing property
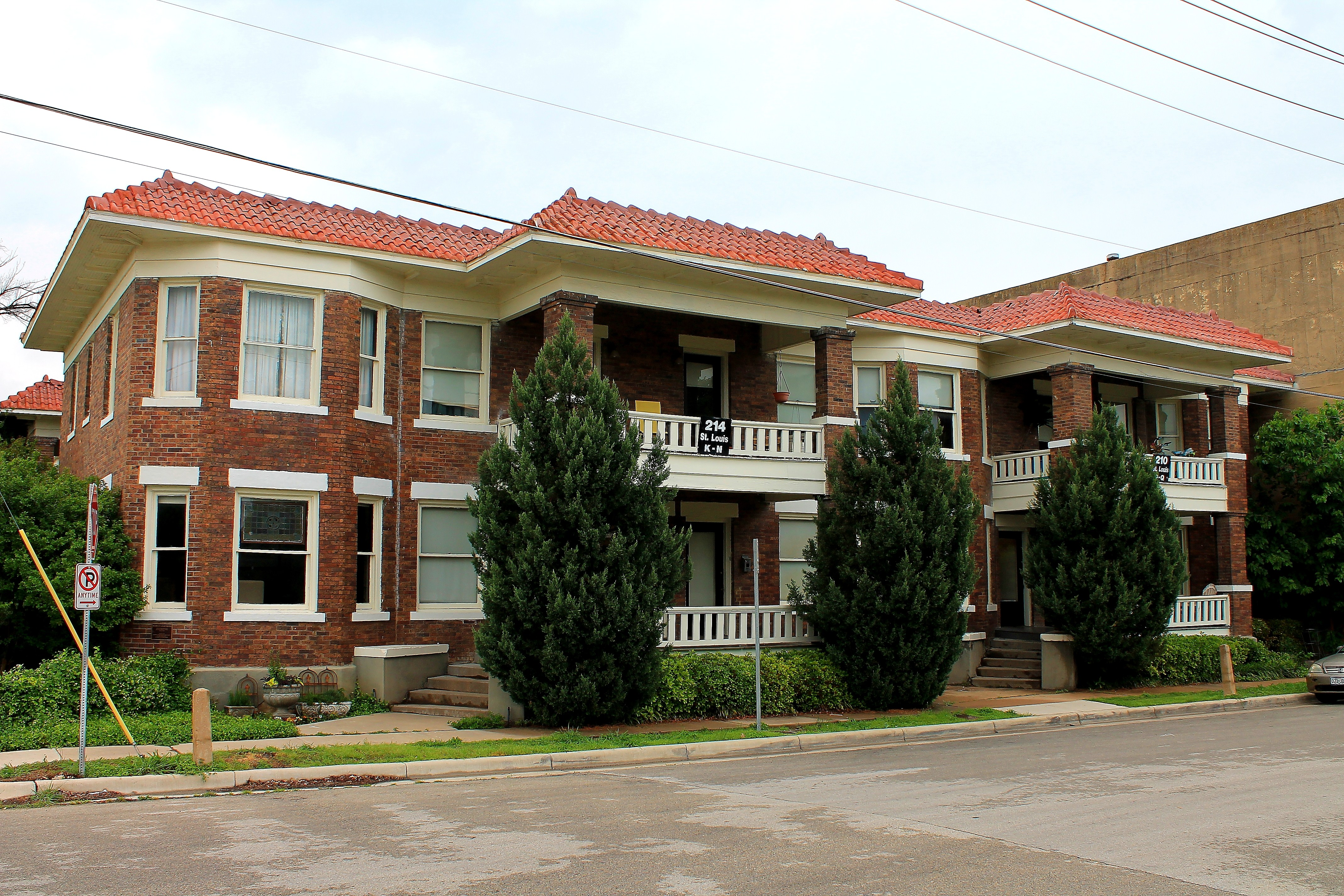
- Markeen Apartments in 2012

- Location within Texas Location within the United States
- Location: 210-14 St. Louis Ave. and 406-10 W. Daggett Ave., Fort Worth, Texas
- Coordinates: 32°45′12″N 97°19′52″W
- Area: less than one acre
- Built: 1910
- Architectural style: Prairie School
- Part of: Jennings-Vickery Historic District (ID100000674)
- NRHP reference No.: 01000470

Significant dates
- Added to NRHP: May 2, 2001
- Designated CP: February 21, 2017

Markeen Apartments is located in the Near Southside of Fort Worth, Texas. The apartments sit on two lots at the northwest corner of Daggett and St. Louis avenues. The two-building complex was constructed in 1910 and designed in the Prairie School Style. It was built by Charles W. Forbes. The complex was purchased in 1999 and renovated. It was listed on the National Register of Historic Places on May 2, 2001.

== See also ==
- National Register of Historic Places listings in Tarrant County, Texas
