= Tabernacle Baptist Church (Fort Worth) =

Historic church in Texas, United States

- U.S. National Register of Historic Places
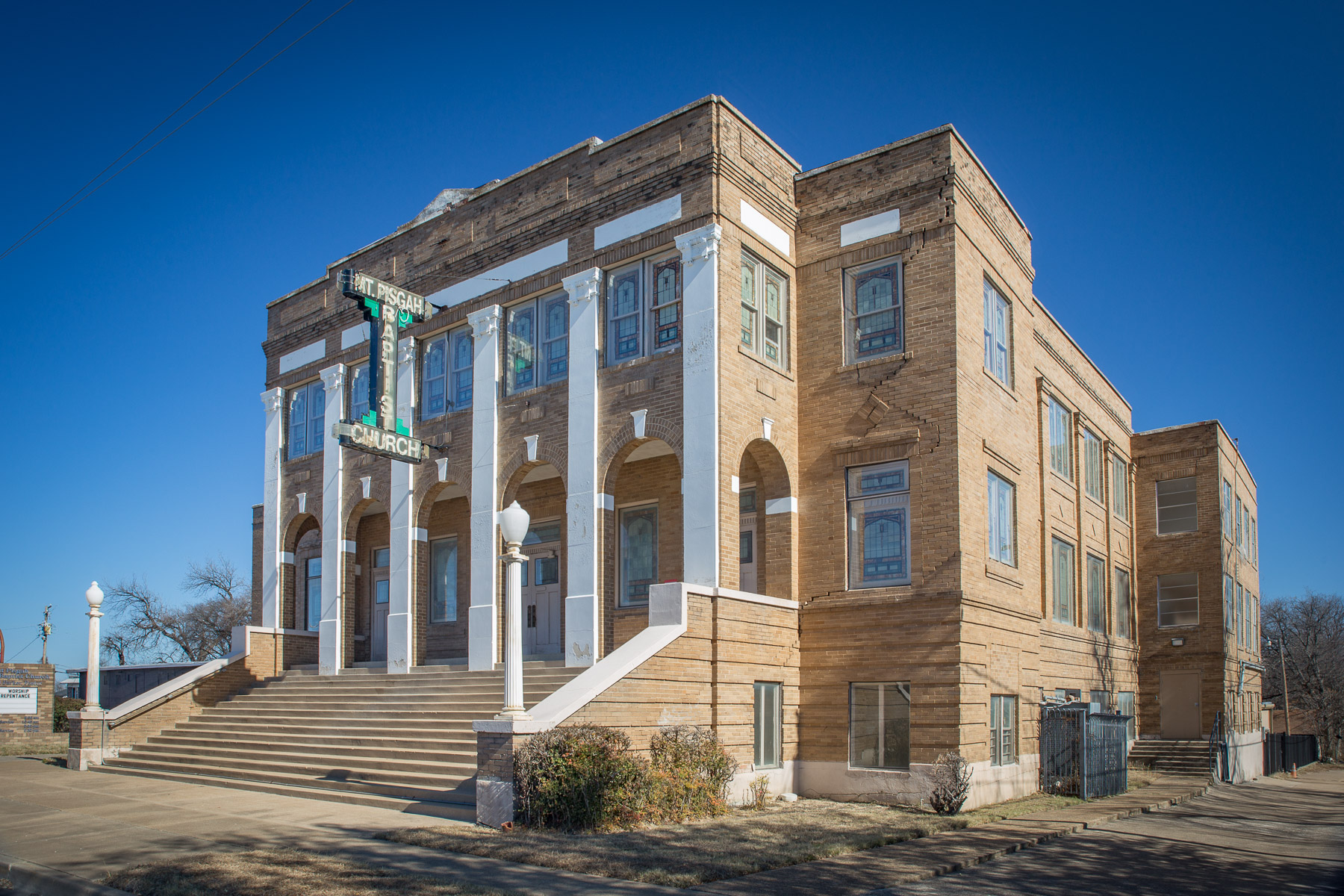
- Tabernacle Baptist Church in 2022

- Location within Texas Location within the United States
- Location: 1801 Evans Ave., Fort Worth, Texas
- Coordinates: 32°43′29″N 97°19′3″W
- Area: less than one acre
- Built: 1923
- Architectural style: Classical Revival
- NRHP reference No.: 99001451
- Added to NRHP: November 30, 1999

Tabernacle Baptist Church (also known as Evans Avenue Baptist Church and now Mt Pisgah Missionary Baptist) is a historic church building at 1801 Evans Avenue in Fort Worth, Texas.

It was built in 1923 and added to the National Register of Historic Places in 1999.

== See also ==
- National Register of Historic Places listings in Tarrant County, Texas
