= Our Mother of Mercy Catholic Church and Parsonage =

Historic church in Texas, United States

- U.S. National Register of Historic Places
- U.S. Historic district – Contributing property
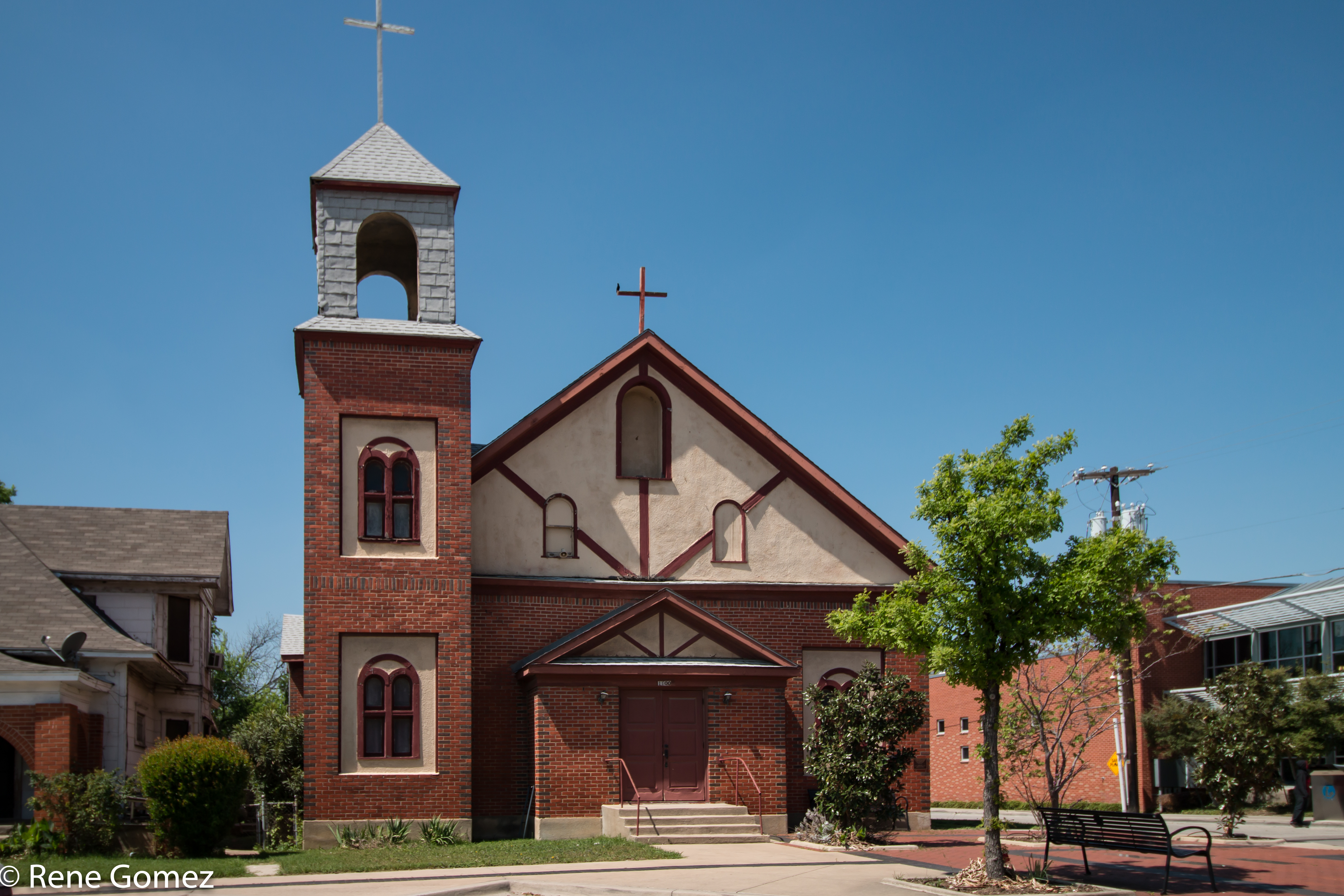
- Our Mother of Mercy Church in 2017

- Location within Texas Location within the United States
- Location: 1100 and 1104 Evans Ave., Fort Worth, Texas
- Coordinates: 32°43′57″N 97°19′5″W
- Area: less than one acre
- Built: 1929
- Architect: N.P. Denis
- Architectural style: Tudor Revival, Queen Anne
- Part of: Near Southeast Historic District (ID02000405)
- NRHP reference No.: 99000882

Significant dates
- Added to NRHP: July 22, 1999
- Designated CP: April 26, 2002

Our Mother of Mercy Catholic Church and Parsonage comprise a historic Black Catholic church property located at 1100 and 1104 Evans Avenue in Fort Worth, Texas. The buildings are located in the historic African-American neighborhood in southeast Fort Worth. The church and the parsonage were built in 1929 and 1911, respectively, and historically were staffed by the Josephites. Both buildings were added to the register in 1999.

== See also ==
- National Register of Historic Places listings in Tarrant County, Texas
