= Morning Chapel C.M.E. Church =

- Morning Chapel Christian Methodist Episcopal Church
- U.S. National Register of Historic Places
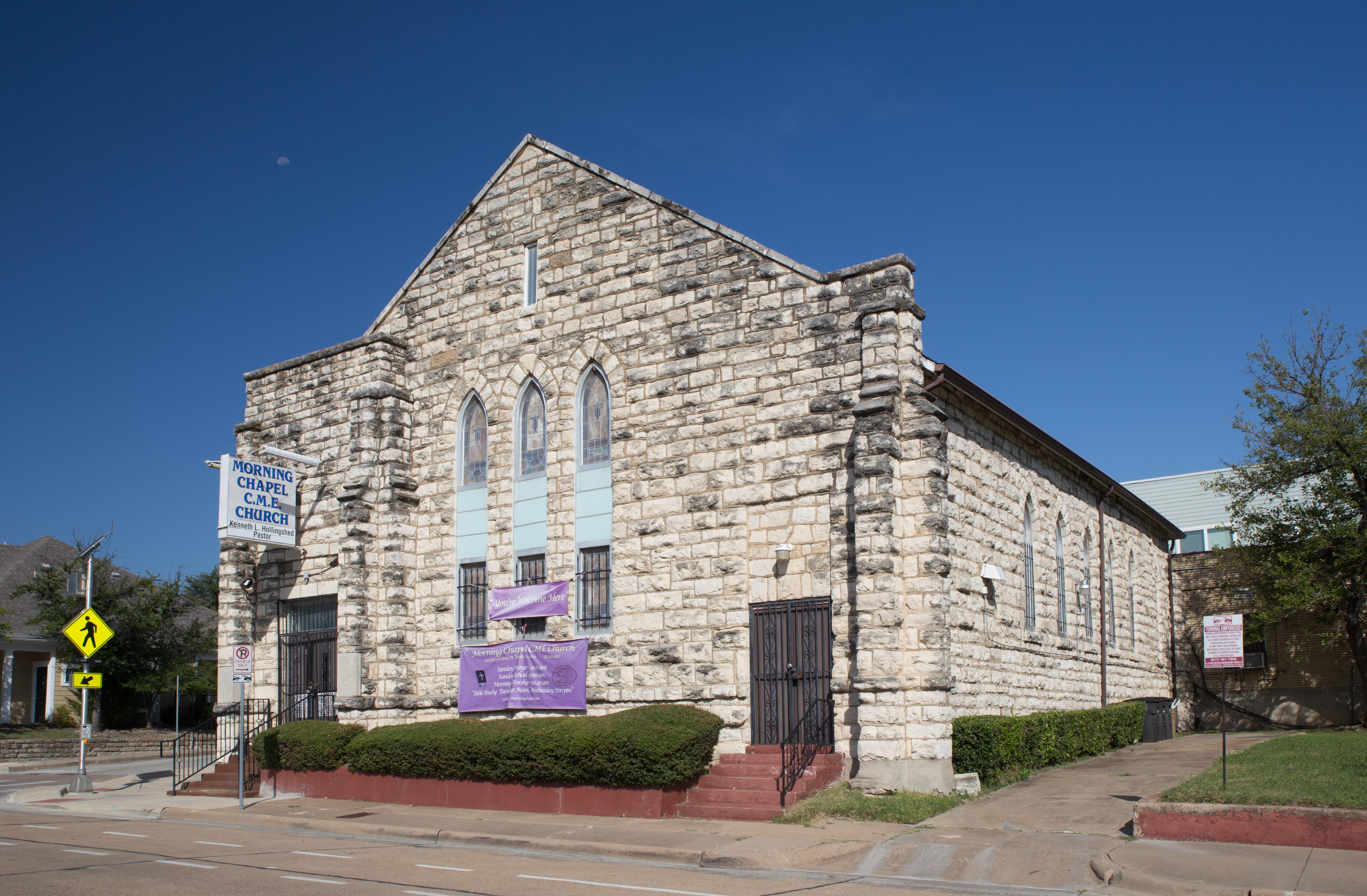
- Morning Chapel in 2022

- Location within Texas Location within the United States
- Location: 903 E. Third St., Fort Worth, Texas
- Coordinates: 32°45′30″N 97°19′32″W
- Area: less than one acre
- Built: 1934
- Architect: W.C. Meador
- Architectural style: Late Gothic Revival
- Website: Official website
- NRHP reference No.: 99001049
- Added to NRHP: August 27, 1999

Morning Chapel Christian Methodist Episcopal Church is a historic Christian Methodist Episcopal church located at 903 E. Third Street in Fort Worth, Texas.

It was built in 1934 and added to the National Register of Historic Places in 1999, where it is listed as the Morning Chapel Colored Methodist Episcopal Church (its name until 1954) at 901 E. Third Street.

== See also ==
- National Register of Historic Places listings in Tarrant County, Texas
- I.M. Terrell High School
