= Grand Avenue Historic District =

Historic district in Texas, United States

- U.S. National Register of Historic Places
- U.S. Historic district
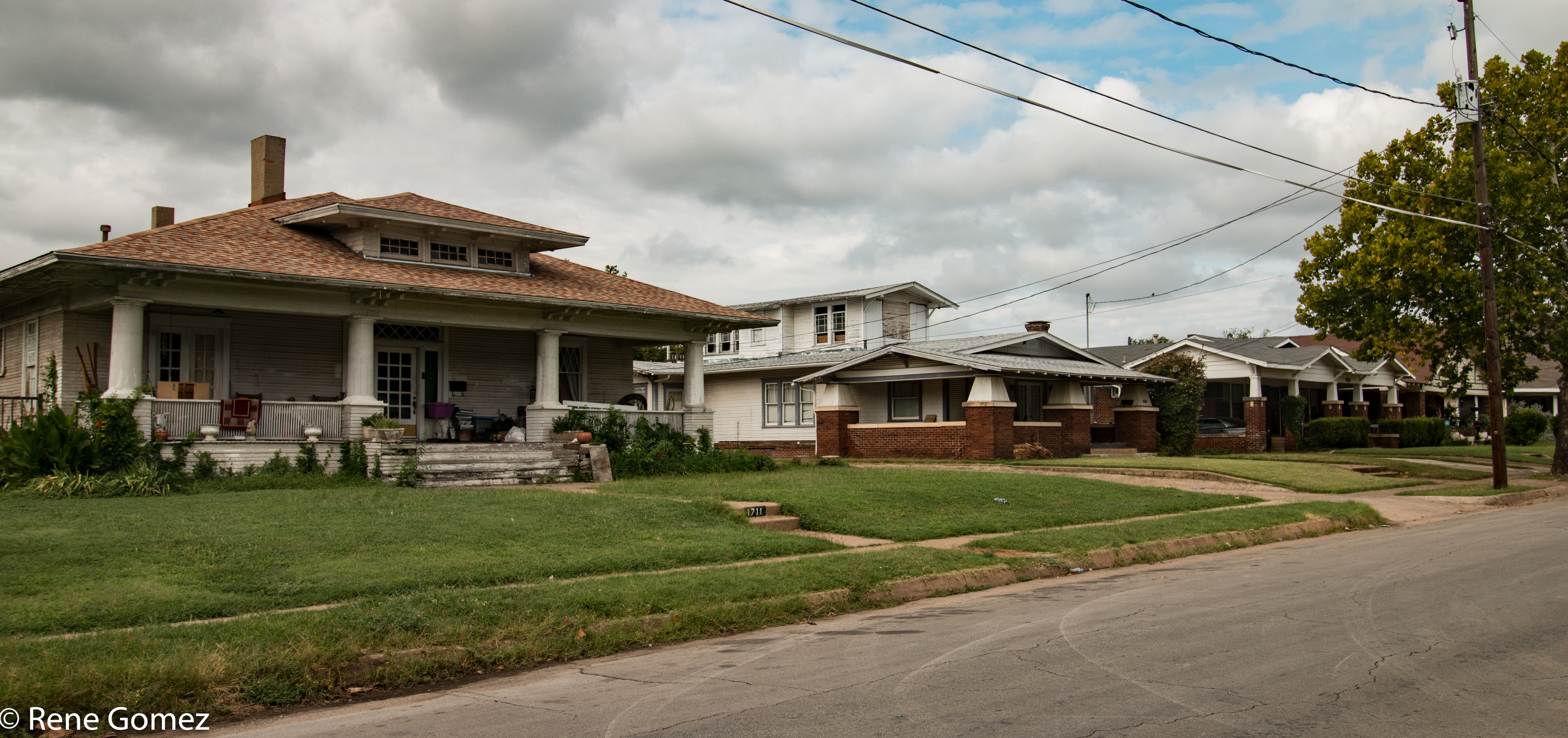
- Grand Avenue in 2017

- Location within Texas Location within the United States
- Location: Roughly Grand Ave. from Northside to Park, Fort Worth, Texas
- Coordinates: 32°46′20″N 97°21′38″W
- Area: 42 acres (17 ha)
- Architectural style: Prairie School, Bungalow/Craftsman, Tudor Revival
- NRHP reference No.: 90000337
- Added to NRHP: March 1, 1990

Grand Avenue Historic District is a platted community located in north Fort Worth, Texas. It sits two miles northwest of the Tarrant County Courthouse. The subdivision was platted in 1888. It comprises the western edge of the original subdivision of North Fort Worth where the street curves along the bluffs above the West Fork of the Trinity River. The district encompasses the properties on both sides of Grand Avenue for approximately seven blocks. It was added to the National Register on March 1, 1990.

== Photo gallery ==
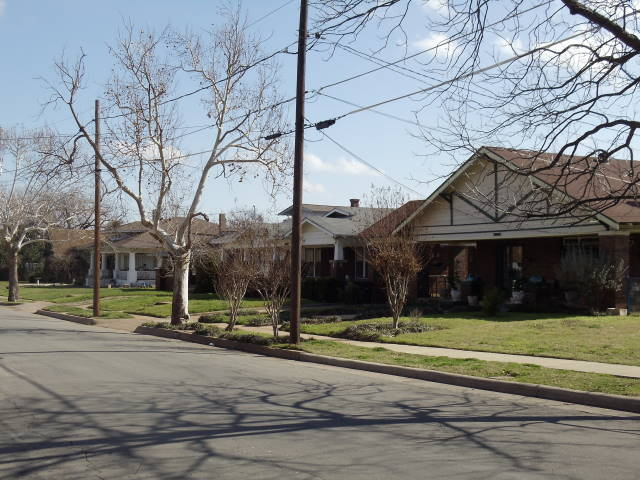

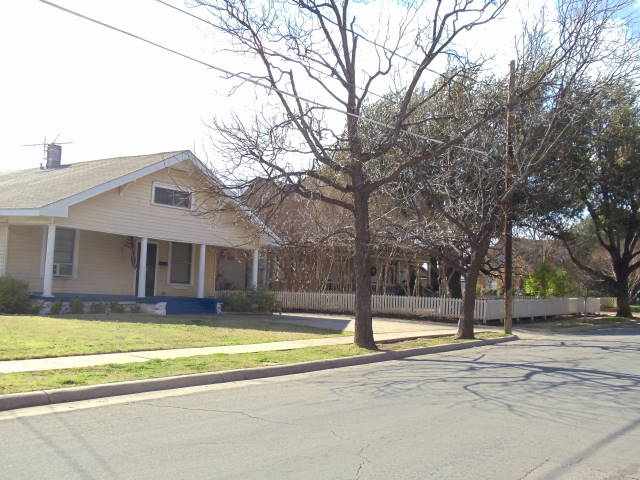

== See also ==
- National Register of Historic Places listings in Tarrant County, Texas
