= Thomas J. and Elizabeth Nash Farm =

- U.S. National Register of Historic Places
- U.S. Historic district
- Recorded Texas Historic Landmark
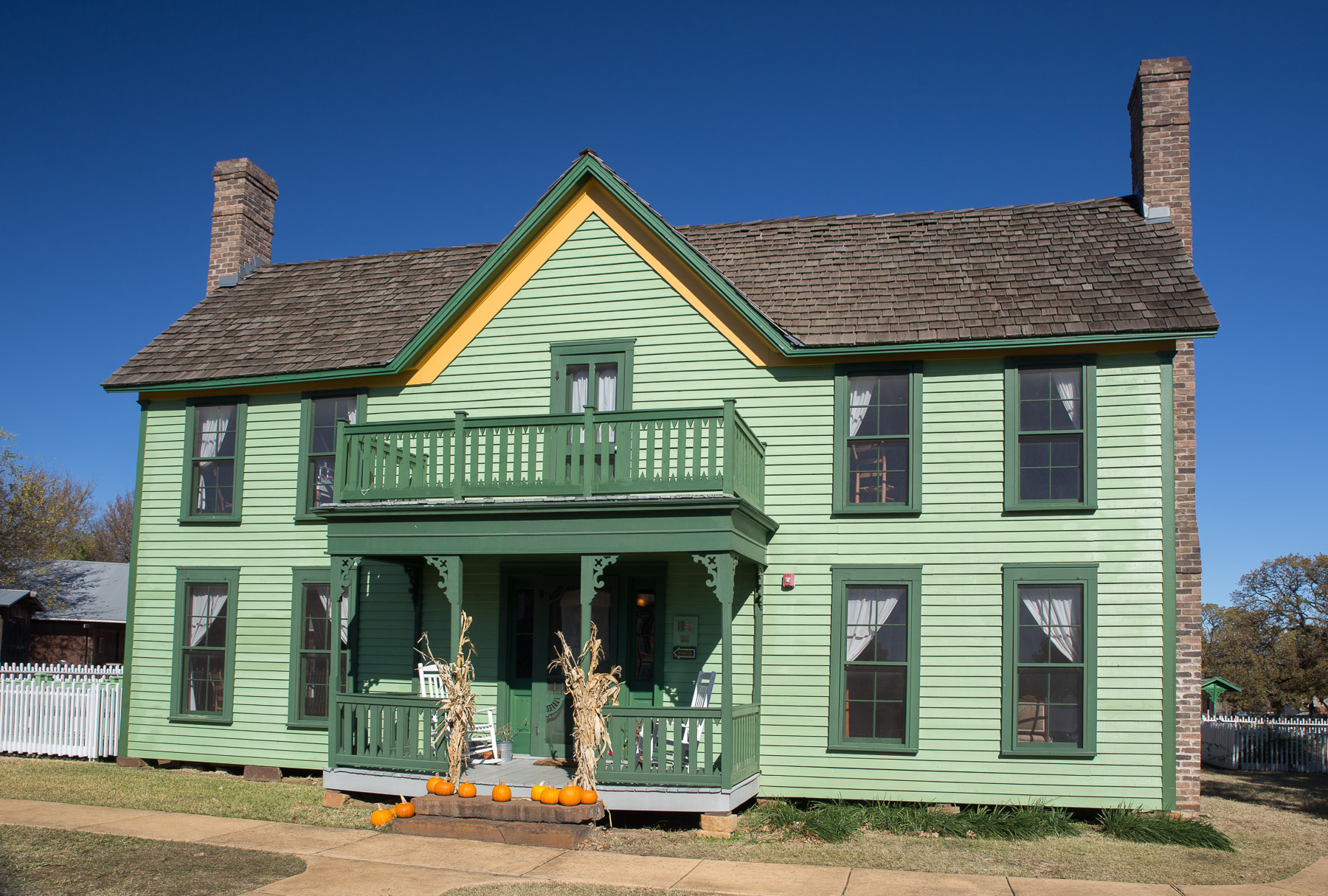
- Front view of the Nash farmhouse in 2021

- Location within Texas Location within the United States
- Location: 626 Ball St, Grapevine, Texas
- Coordinates: 32°45′32″N 97°19′38″W
- Area: 5.2 acres (2.1 ha)
- Architectural style: Gothic, Carpenter Gothic, I House
- Website: Nash Farm
- NRHP reference No.: 10000866
- RTHL No.: 17960

Significant dates
- Added to NRHP: October 28, 2010
- Designated RTHL: 2014

Thomas J. and Elizabeth Nash Farm is located on 626 Ball Street in Grapevine, Texas. The 5.2-acre farm is now owned by the city and operated by the Grapevine Heritage as a heritage farm museum known as Nash Farm.

The farm was added to the National Register on October 28, 2010.

== Photo gallery ==
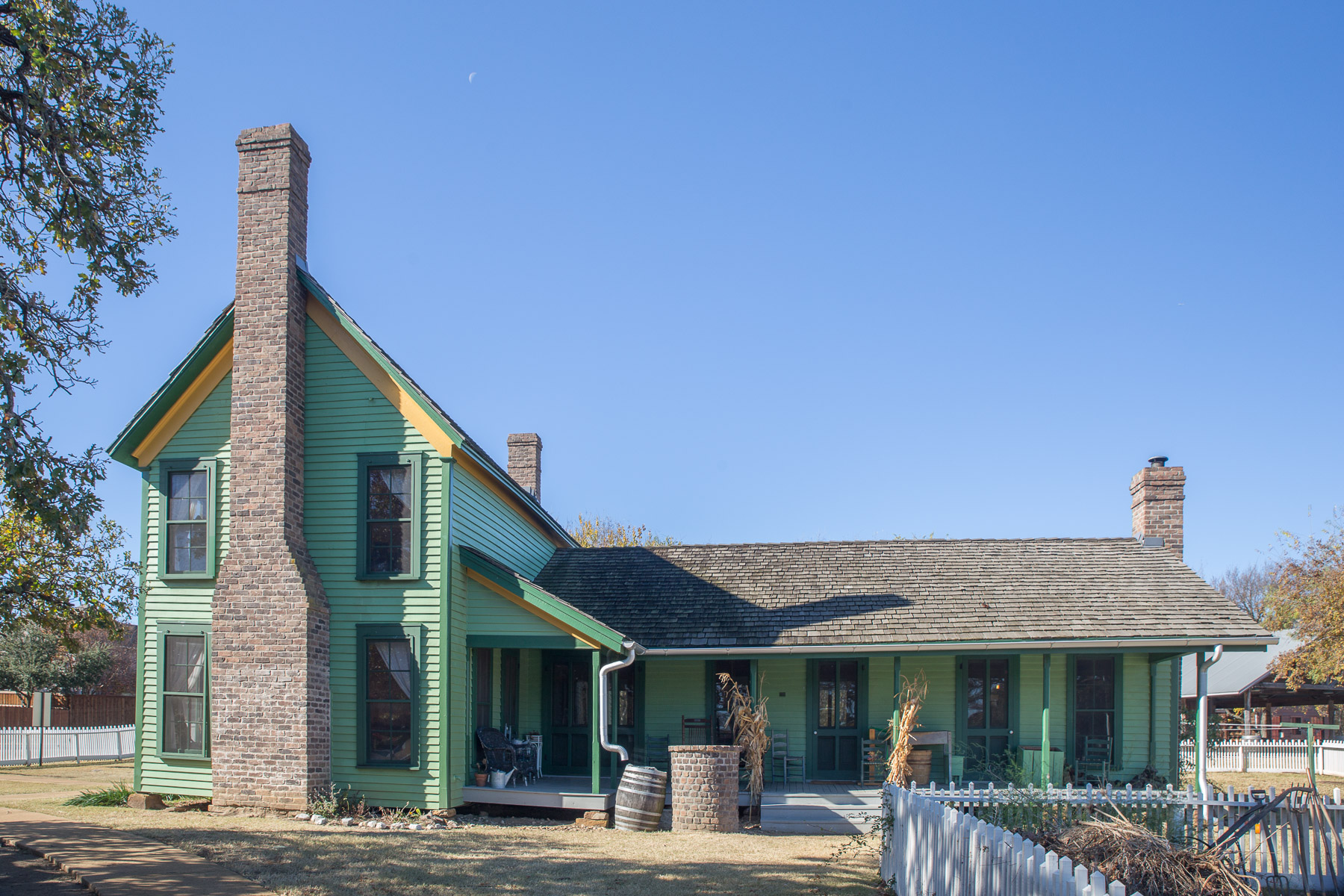

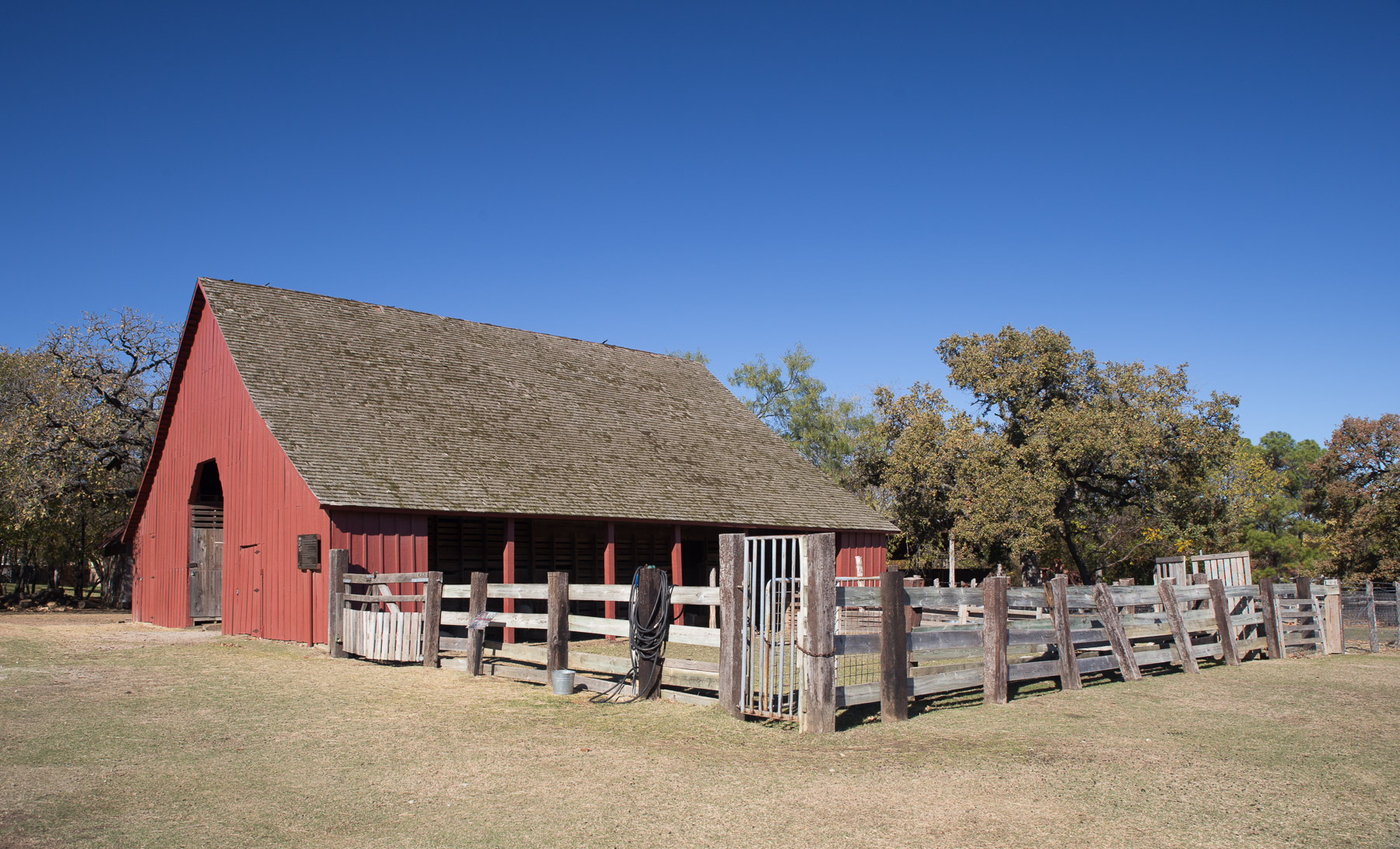

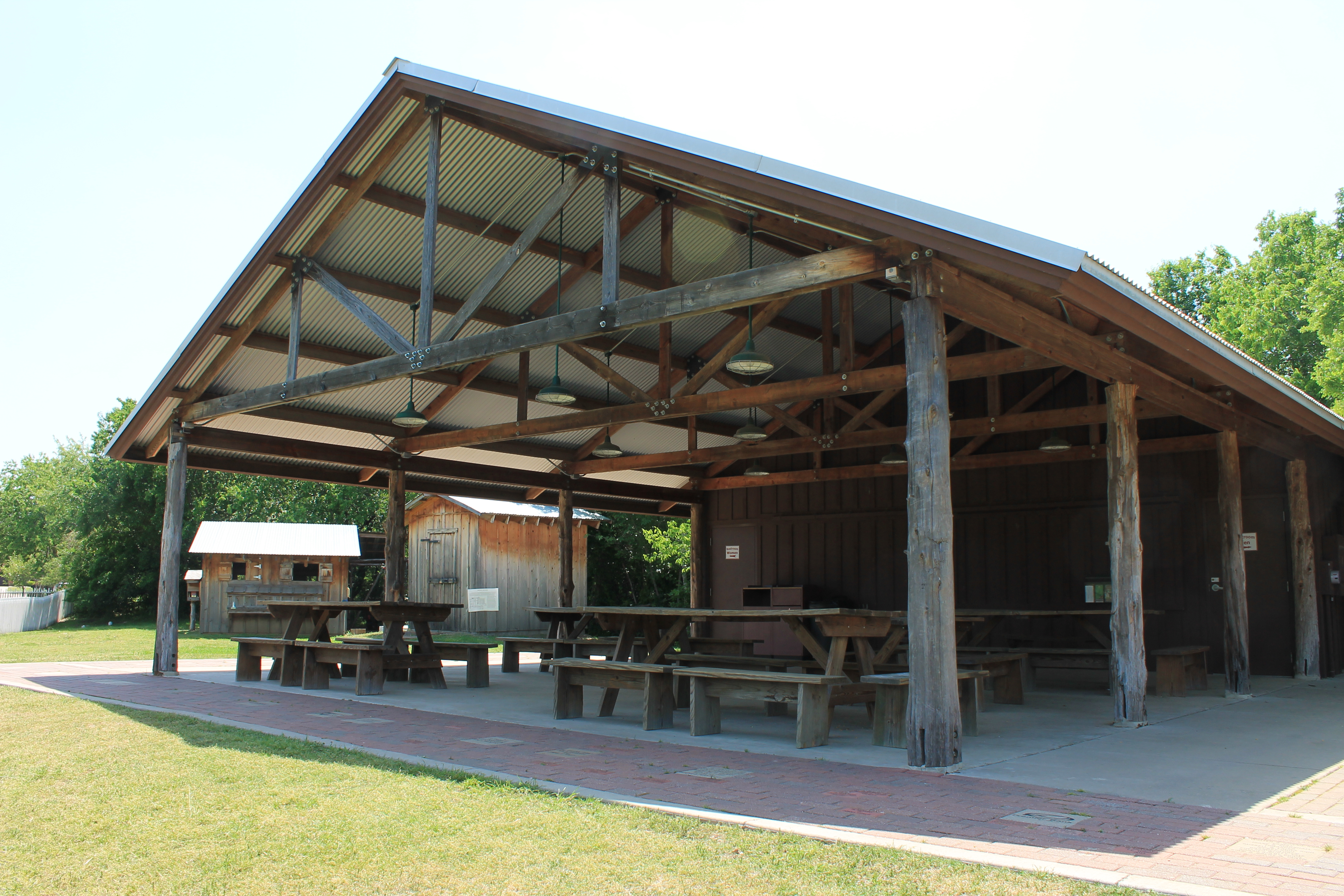

== See also ==
- National Register of Historic Places listings in Tarrant County, Texas
- Recorded Texas Historic Landmarks in Tarrant County
