= Saint James Second Street Baptist Church =

Historic church in Texas, United States

- U.S. National Register of Historic Places
- Recorded Texas Historic Landmark
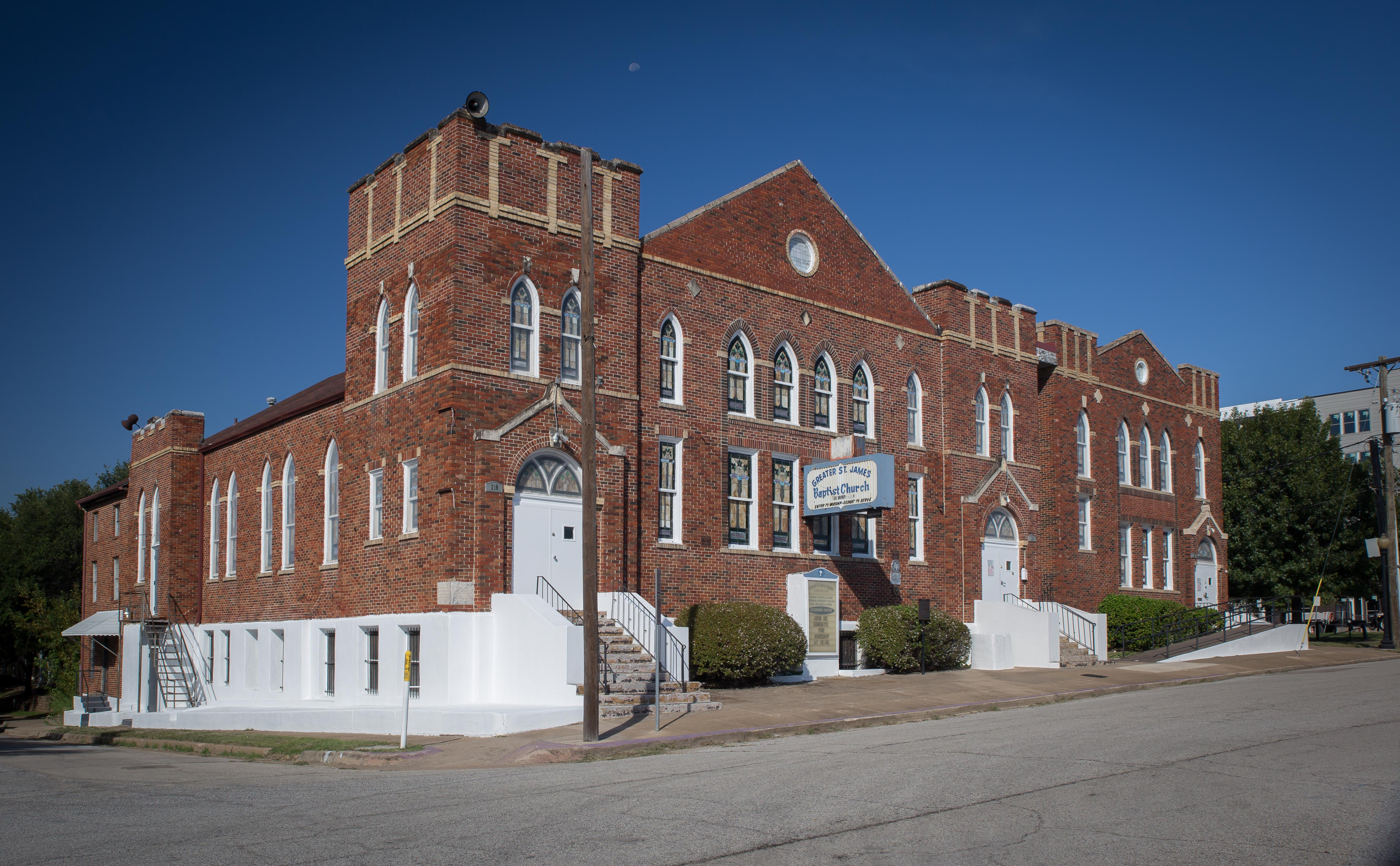
- St. James Church in 2022

- Location within Texas Location within the United States
- Location: 210 Harding St., Fort Worth, Texas
- Coordinates: 32°45′34″N 97°19′28″W
- Area: less than one acre
- Built: 1913
- Built by: George R. Powell, B.G. Rhodes
- Architect: Frank J. Singleton
- Architectural style: Late Victorian
- NRHP reference No.: 99000883
- RTHL No.: 2266

Significant dates
- Added to NRHP: July 22, 1999
- Designated RTHL: 1986

Saint James Second Street Baptist Church is a historic church at 210 Harding Street in Fort Worth, Texas. The congregation was founded in 1895 by the Reverend J. Francis Robinson. Construction of the church began in 1913, by architect Frank J. Singleton. African-American contractor George Powell built the south wing, while B.G. Rhodes built the north wing. Short square entry towers frame the Gothic Revival style red-brick building, and the lancet-shaped art glass windows give it a fortress-like appearance.

Services were held in the basement until construction was finished in 1918. For many years the church held graduation ceremonies for I.M. Terrell High School. The church was designated as a Recorded Texas Historic Landmark in 1986. It was added to the National Register in 1999. In 2004, an electrical fire sparked a three-alarm blaze and caused $100,000 in damage.

== See also ==
- National Register of Historic Places listings in Tarrant County, Texas
- Recorded Texas Historic Landmarks in Tarrant County
