= Westover Manor =

Historic house in Texas, United States

- U.S. National Register of Historic Places
- Recorded Texas Historic Landmark
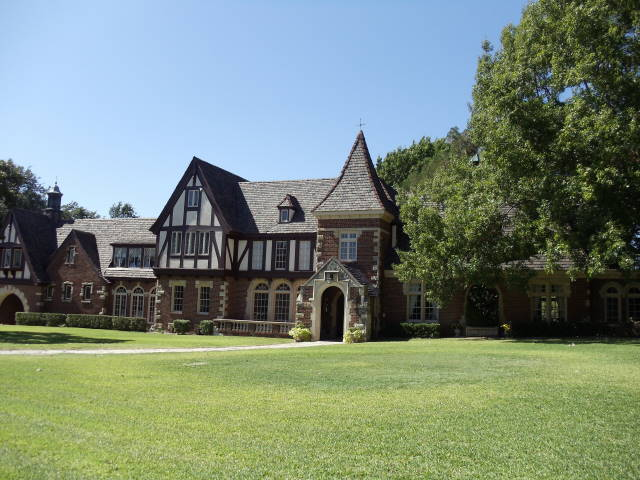
- Westover Manor in 2011

- Location within Texas Location within the United States
- Location: 8 Westover Rd., Westover Hills, Texas
- Coordinates: 32°44′31″N 97°24′14″W
- Area: 2.6 acres (1.1 ha)
- Built: 1929
- Built by: A. Clayton Luther, John E. Byrne
- Architect: Victor Marr Curtis, et al.
- Architectural style: Tudor Revival, Jacobethan Revival/Norman
- NRHP reference No.: 88002709
- RTHL No.: 5771

Significant dates
- Added to NRHP: 15 December 1988
- Designated RTHL: 1988

Westover Manor is a historic house located in Westover Hills, Texas. It was added to the National Register of Historic Places on December 15, 1988.

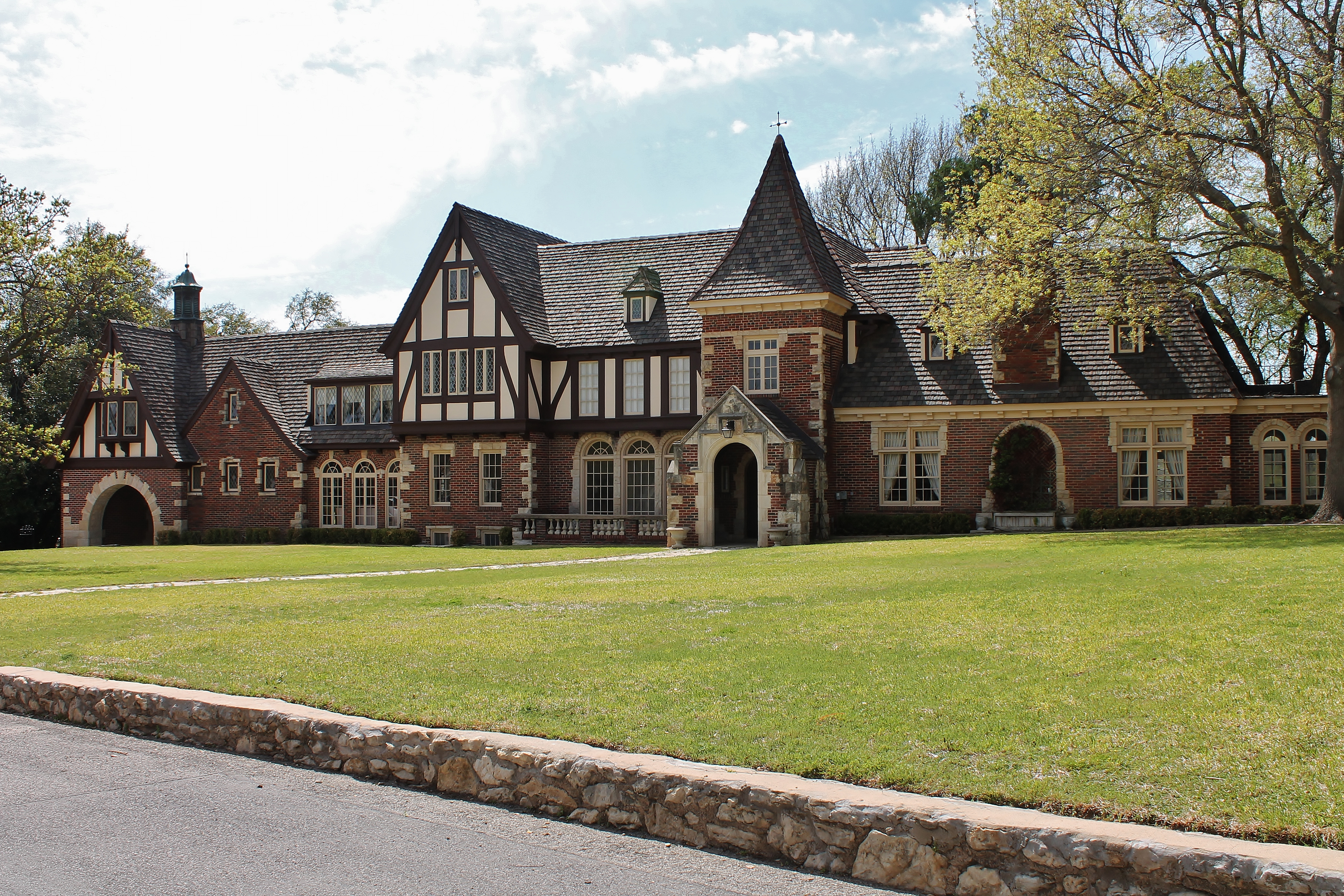
Westover Manor in 2014

== See also ==
- National Register of Historic Places listings in Tarrant County, Texas
- Recorded Texas Historic Landmarks in Tarrant County
