= Marrow Bone Spring Archeological Site =

- U.S. National Register of Historic Places
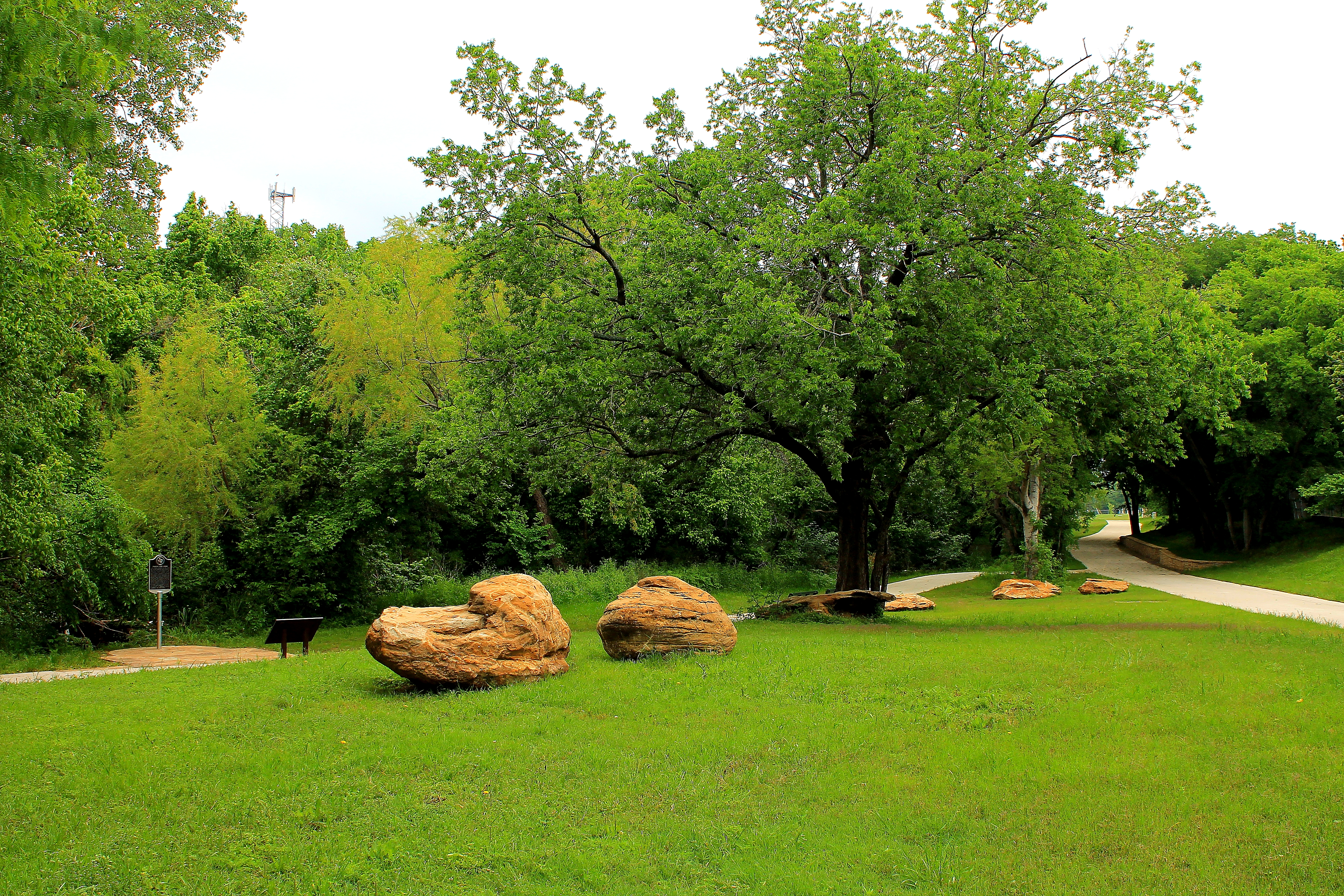
- Around state historical marker near Marrow Bone Spring

- Location within Texas Location within the United States
- Location: Vandergriff Park in Arlington, Texas
- Coordinates: 32°42′7″N 97°6′47″W
- Area: 10 acres (4.0 ha)
- NRHP reference No.: 78002980
- Added to NRHP: November 21, 1978

Marrow Bone Spring Archeological Site is located in Marrow Bone Spring Park, north of Vandergriff Park, in Arlington, Texas, United States. It was added to the National Register of Historic Places in November 21, 1978.

== History ==
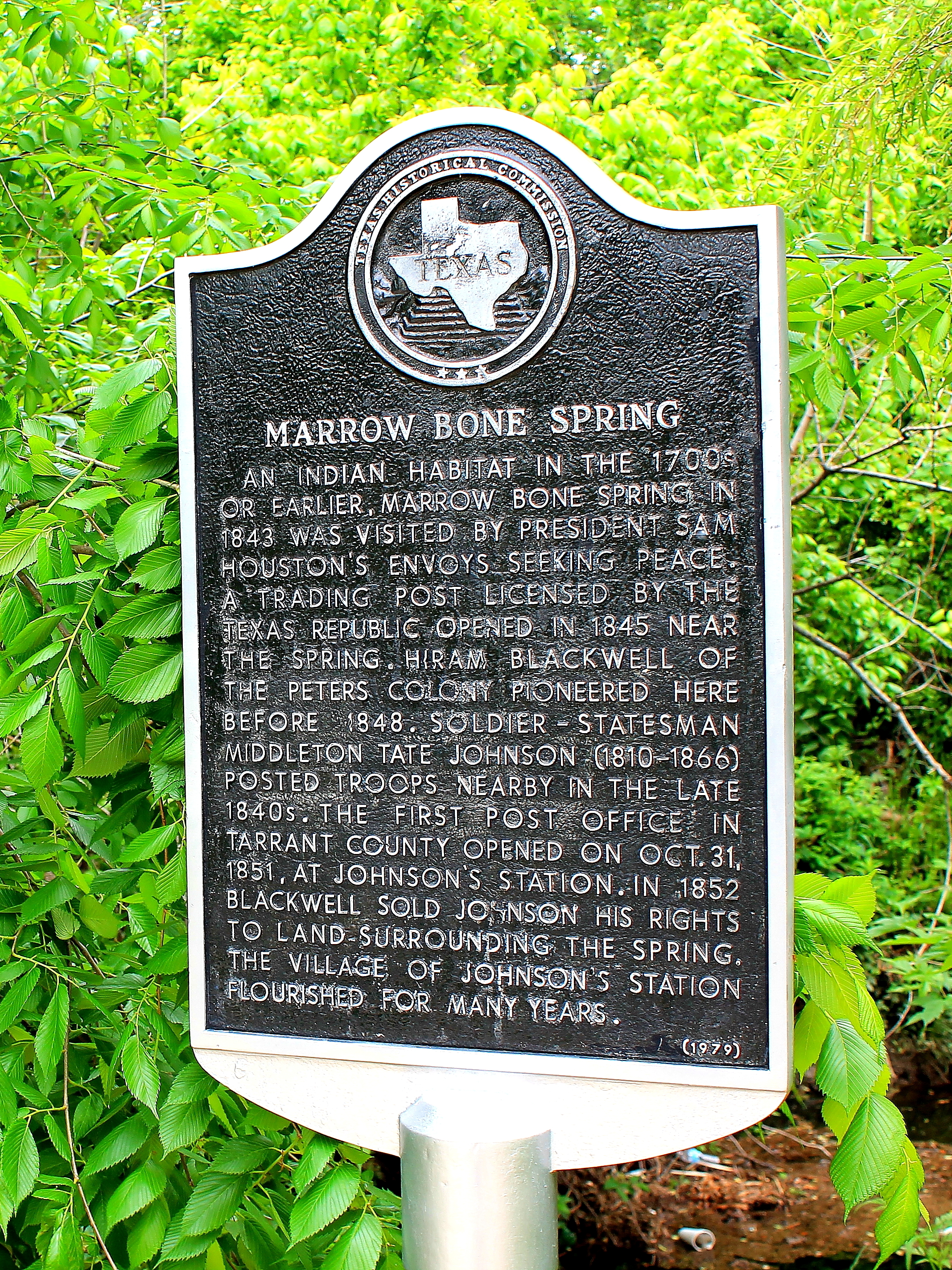
The plaque at Marrow Bone Spring

Historians disagree on what happened at the site. The name is theorized to have been coined because of an argument between La Salle and Sieur Moranget, discussing the bone marrow of a buffalo, that 11 Indians witnessed.

Marrow Bone Spring was Indian habitat in the 1700s or earlier. In 1843, the first white settlement consisting of President Sam Houston's envoys seeking peace, south of the Trinity River was at Marrow Bone Spring, where old Indian arrowhead stones were discovered. In 1845, Mathias Travis and I.C. Spence opened a trading post and bartered with Indians from the region. Among goods exchanged were the Indians' pelts and belts for staple food, mirrors, and black neckties.

On December 22, 2010, bids were heard to build a trail and parking lot facilities around the site. On June 4, 2013, bids were heard to repair erosion around the area.

== See also ==
- National Register of Historic Places listings in Tarrant County, Texas
