= Fort Worth Public Market =

- U.S. National Register of Historic Places
- Recorded Texas Historic Landmark
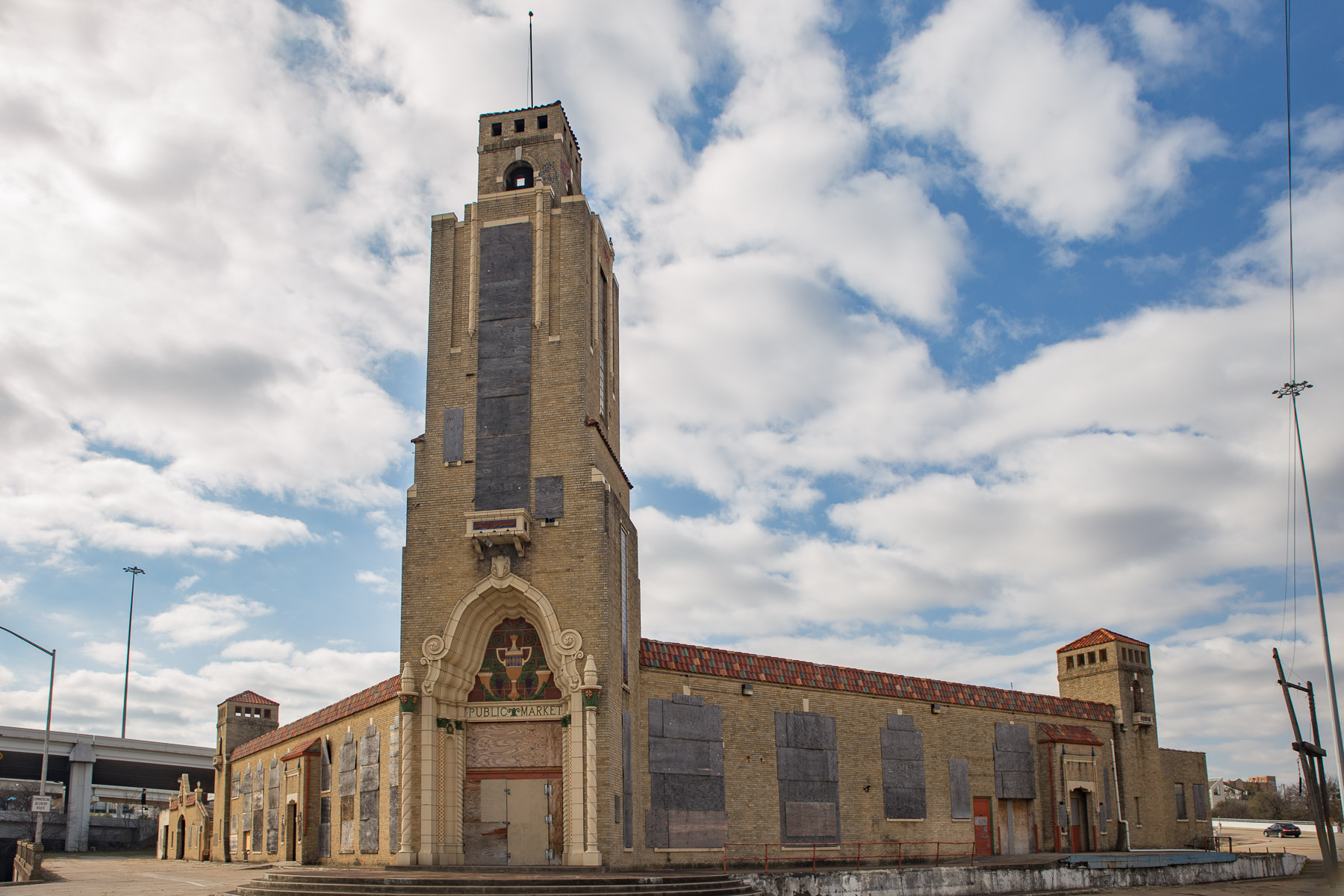
- Public Market in 2022

- Location within Texas Location within the United States
- Location: 1400 Henderson St., Fort Worth, Texas
- Coordinates: 32°44′39″N 97°20′16″W
- Area: less than one acre
- Built: 1930
- Architect: B. Gaylord Noftsger
- Engineer: Quisle & Andrews
- Architectural style: Mission/Spanish Revival, Spanish Colonial Revival
- NRHP reference No.: 84001981
- RTHL No.: 2031

Significant dates
- Added to NRHP: July 5, 1984
- Designated RTHL: 1980

Fort Worth Public Market is a historic farmers' market and retail building located in Fort Worth, Texas. The building was designed by B. Gaylord Noftsger, a native of Oklahoma City. Developer John J. Harden, also from Oklahoma, spent $150,000 on the building, which opened to the public on June 20, 1930. The building is noted for its terracotta tile and multi-colored tile roof. The main tower is decorated with terracotta columns and pilasters. The building housed various businesses such as grocers, bakers and butchers. At its peak, the Public Market had space for 145 farmer and vendor stalls and 30 permanent retail shops.

The building was purchased in 1944 by R.C. Bowen of Bowen Properties; in 2010 a fire destroyed a shed behind the main building. In 2012 the building was purchased by oil and gas mogul Bob Simpson, who sold the building to MC Estates in 2014. It was named a Texas Historical Landmark in 1980 and added to the National Register of Historic Places on July 5, 1984.

== See also ==
- National Register of Historic Places listings in Tarrant County, Texas
- Recorded Texas Historic Landmarks in Tarrant County
