= Grapevine Commercial Historic District =

Historic district in Texas, United States

- U.S. National Register of Historic Places
- U.S. Historic district
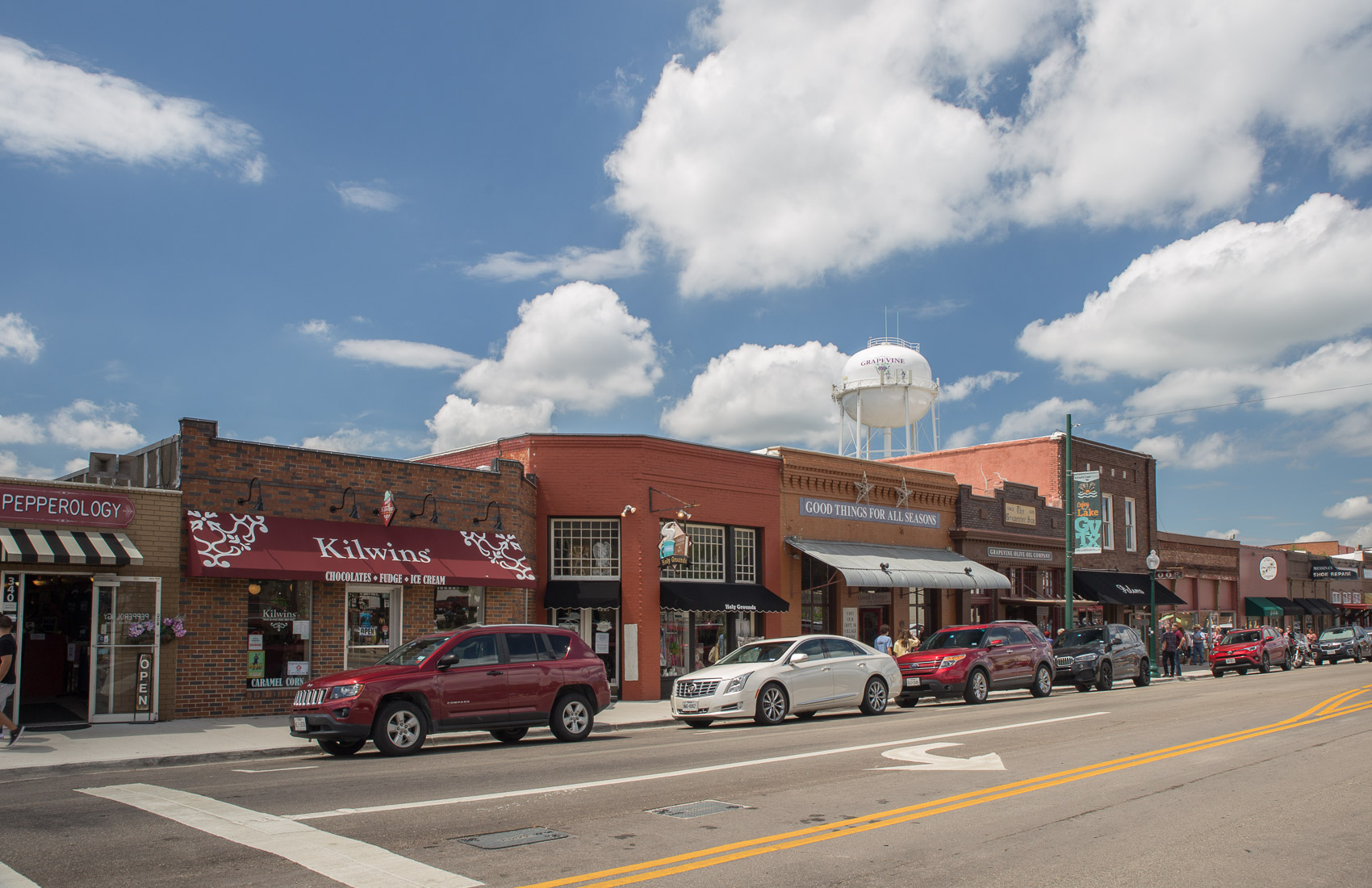
- S. Main St. in 2021

- Location within Texas Location within the United States
- Location: 300-530 S. Main St., Grapevine, Texas
- Coordinates: 32°56′12″N 97°4′43″W
- Area: 8.5 acres (3.4 ha)
- Architectural style: One-part commercial block, Early Commercial
- MPS: Grapevine MPS (64500637)
- NRHP reference No.: 92000097 (original); 97000444 (increase 1); 02001569 (increase 2)

Significant dates
- Added to NRHP: March 9, 1992
- Boundary increases: May 16, 1997; December 19, 2002

Grapevine Commercial Historic District is located in Grapevine, Texas.

It was added to the National Register on March 9, 1992.

== Photo gallery ==
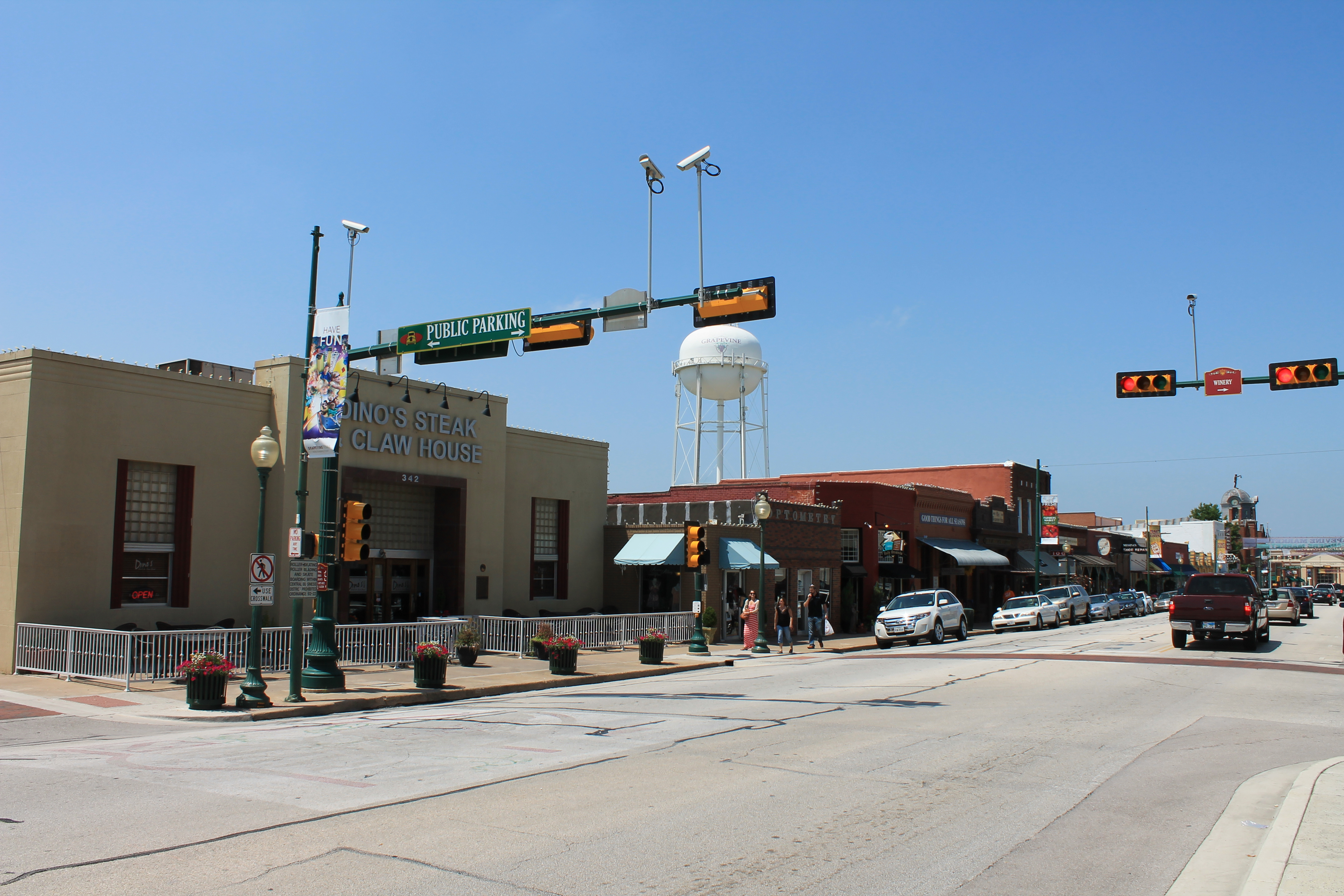

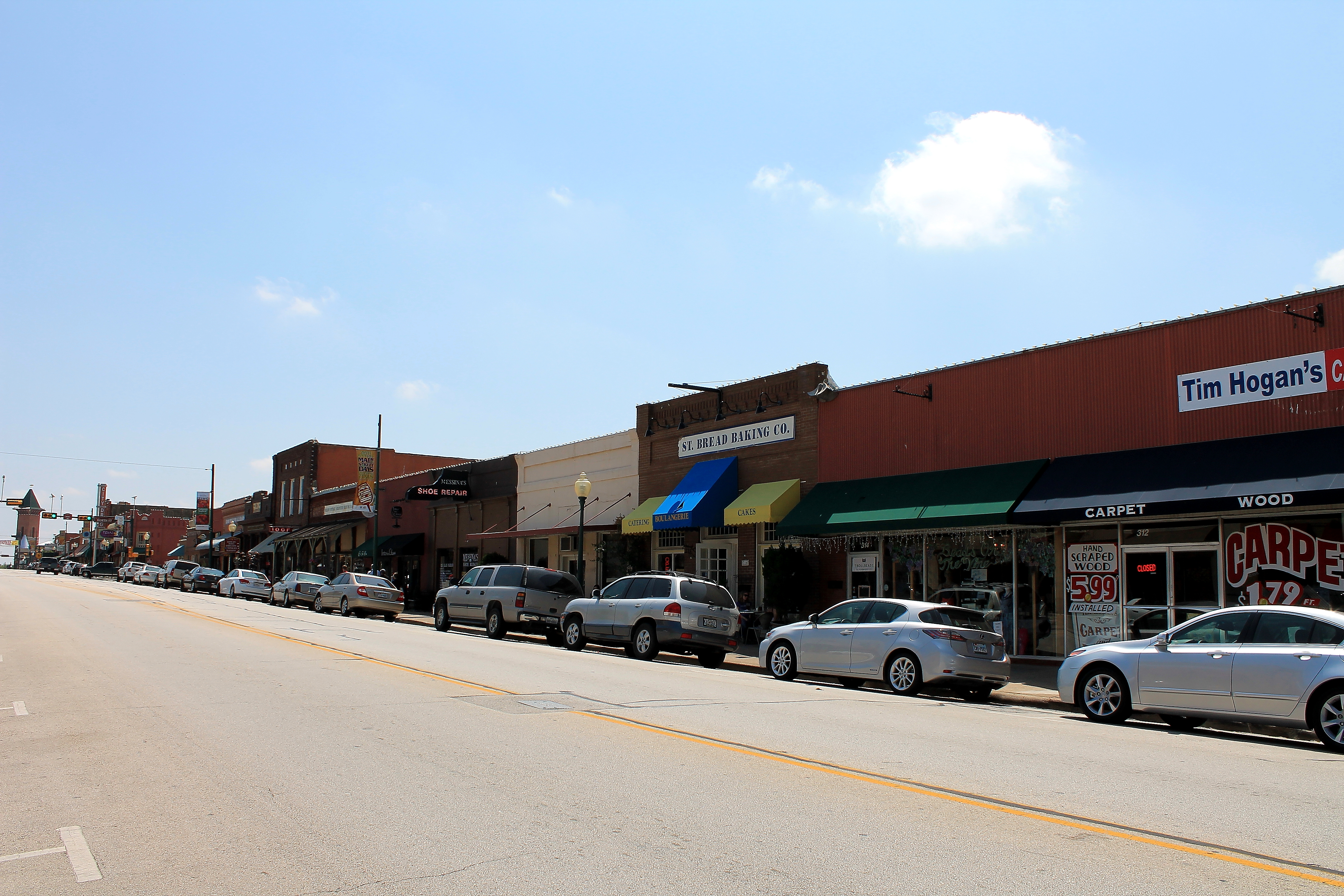

== See also ==
- Historic districts in the United States
- National Register of Historic Places listings in Tarrant County, Texas
