= Leuda–May Historic District =

Historic district in Texas, United States

- U.S. National Register of Historic Places
- U.S. Historic district
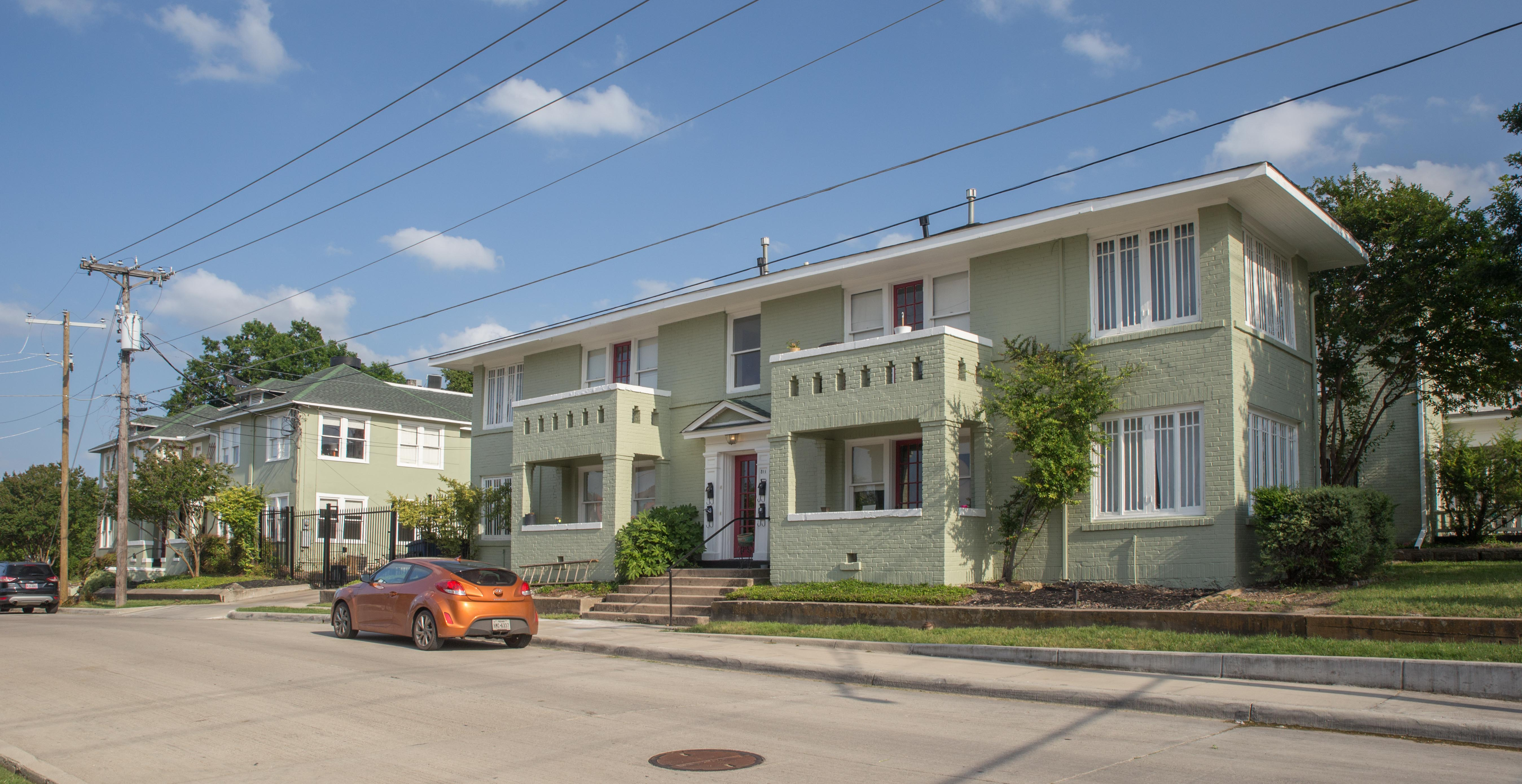
- W. Leuda St. in 2019

- Location within Texas Location within the United States
- Location: 301-311 W. Leuda and 805-807 May Sts., Fort Worth, Texas
- Coordinates: 32°44′14″N 97°19′44″W
- Area: less than one acre
- Architectural style: Colonial Revival, Prairie School
- NRHP reference No.: 05000240
- Added to NRHP: May 30, 2005

Leuda–May Historic Apartments are located approximately 3/4 of a mile south of downtown Fort Worth, Texas. The district is composed of five buildings that were built between 1914 and 1936. Three of the buildings are apartment buildings and the other two are 2-story garage/apartment buildings.

It was added to the National Register on May 30, 2005.

== See also ==
- National Register of Historic Places listings in Tarrant County, Texas
