= Inspiration Point Shelter House =

- U.S. National Register of Historic Places
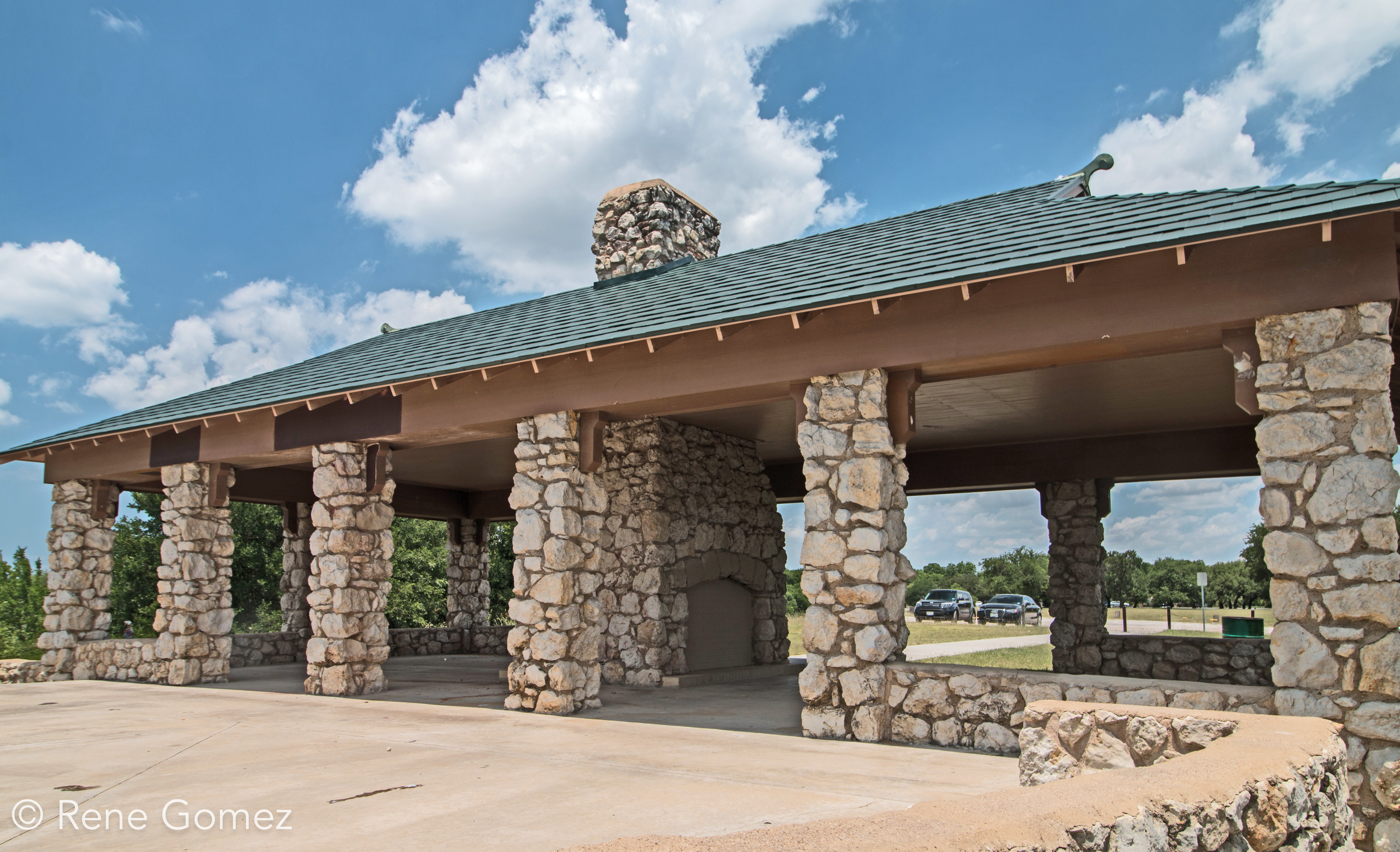
- Shelter House in 2018

- Location within Texas Location within the United States
- Location: Roughly 250 yds. S. of 2400 blk. of Roberts Cut Off Rd. in Marion Sansom Park, Fort Worth, Texas
- Coordinates: 32°45′32″N 97°19′38″W
- Area: less than one acre
- Built: 1927
- Built by: Thomas S. Byrne
- Architect: E.W. Van Slyke & Co.
- Architectural style: Rustic
- NRHP reference No.: 14000105
- Added to NRHP: March 31, 2014

Inspiration Point Shelter House is an open-air pavilion located at Marion Sansom Park in Fort Worth, Texas. Built in 1927, the pavilion stands on a limestone bluff facing south-southwest overlooking Lake Worth dam, an old fish hatchery and the Naval Air Station Joint Reserve Base. The structure was designed in a style sometimes referred to as National Park Service Rustic or Parkitecture. It was built primarily of limestone. On December 22, 1973, a fire destroyed the original roof. The pavilion was restored 38 years later in 2011. It was added to the National Register of Historic Places on March 31, 2014.

== See also ==
- National Register of Historic Places listings in Tarrant County, Texas
