= Roy A. and Gladys Westbrook House =

Historic house in Texas, United States

- U.S. National Register of Historic Places
- Recorded Texas Historic Landmark
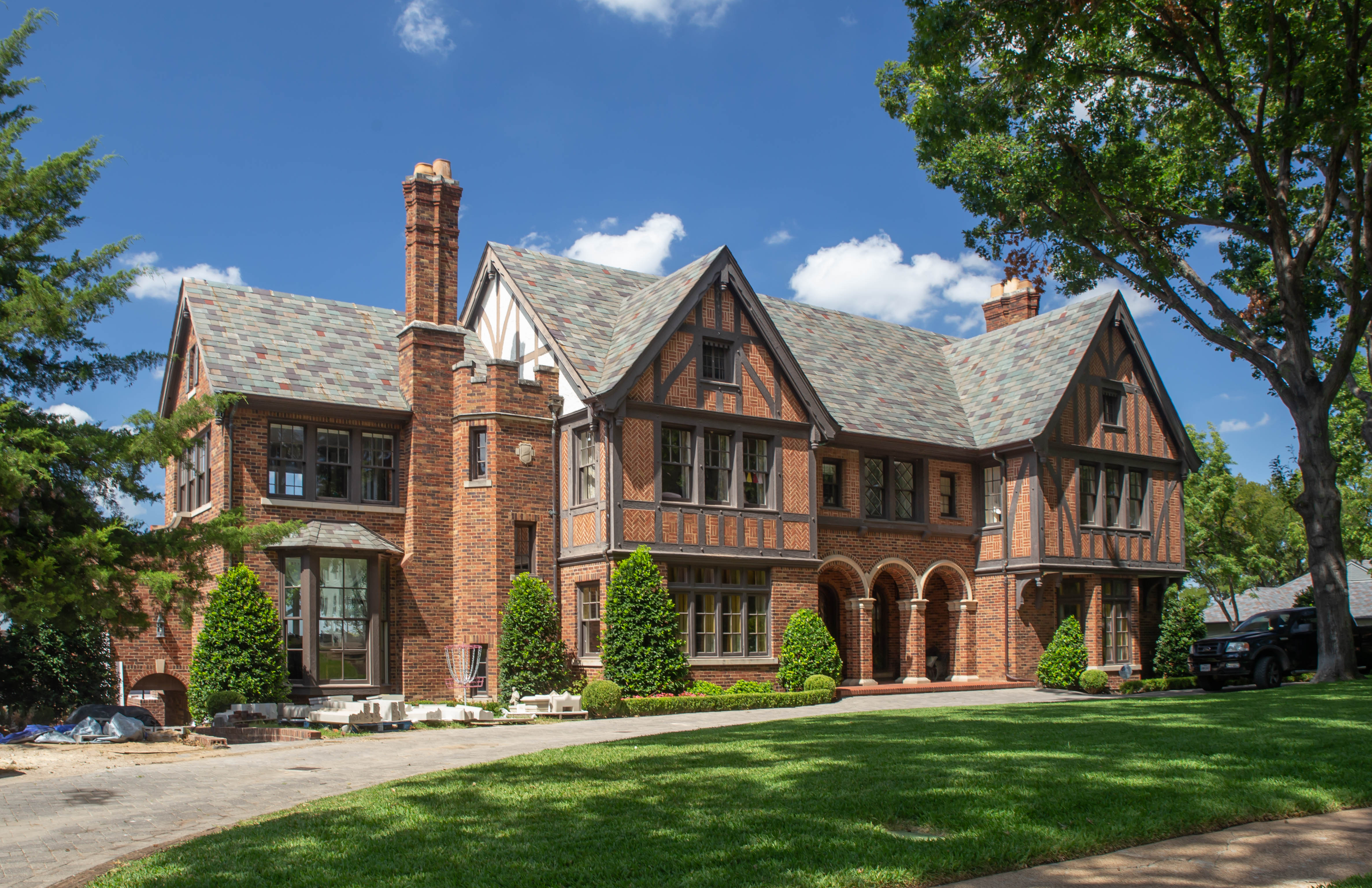
- Westbrook House in 2019

- Location within Texas Location within the United States
- Location: 2232 Winton Terrace W., Fort Worth, Texas
- Coordinates: 32°43′20″N 97°21′33″W
- Area: 1.5 acres (0.61 ha)
- Built: 1928
- Architect: Joseph Pelich
- Architectural style: Tudor Revival
- NRHP reference No.: 08001300
- RTHL No.: 15766

Significant dates
- Added to NRHP: January 8, 2009
- Designated RTHL: 2009

Roy A. And Gladys Westbrook House is located in Fort Worth, Texas, United States. It was added to the National Register of Historic Places on January 8, 2009.

In 1946, oilman William Clark acquired the house. He divorced his second wife in 1950, and on February 13, 1951, married Mary Waterstreet Tuerpe. By 1953, Clark had become convinced that Tuerpe had married him for his money, and he sought an annulment. He also changed his will so that Tuerpe would get just $10. The majority of his $750,000 estate was given to charity. Twelve days after making the change, on May 22, 1953, his body was discovered in the house; he had been shot on May 19. The original finding of suicide was changed to murder. His wife, Mary Clark, and three ex-convicts were charged in the plot. Two of the three men who were accused as accomplices were murdered themselves before the case went to trial. In 1955, Tuerpe was acquitted, and the one surviving accomplice was given a five-year sentence in exchange for his cooperation in the prosecution. Tuerpe remained in the house for another fifty years.

== See also ==
- National Register of Historic Places listings in Tarrant County, Texas
- Recorded Texas Historic Landmarks in Tarrant County
