= Henderson Street Bridge =

- U.S. National Register of Historic Places
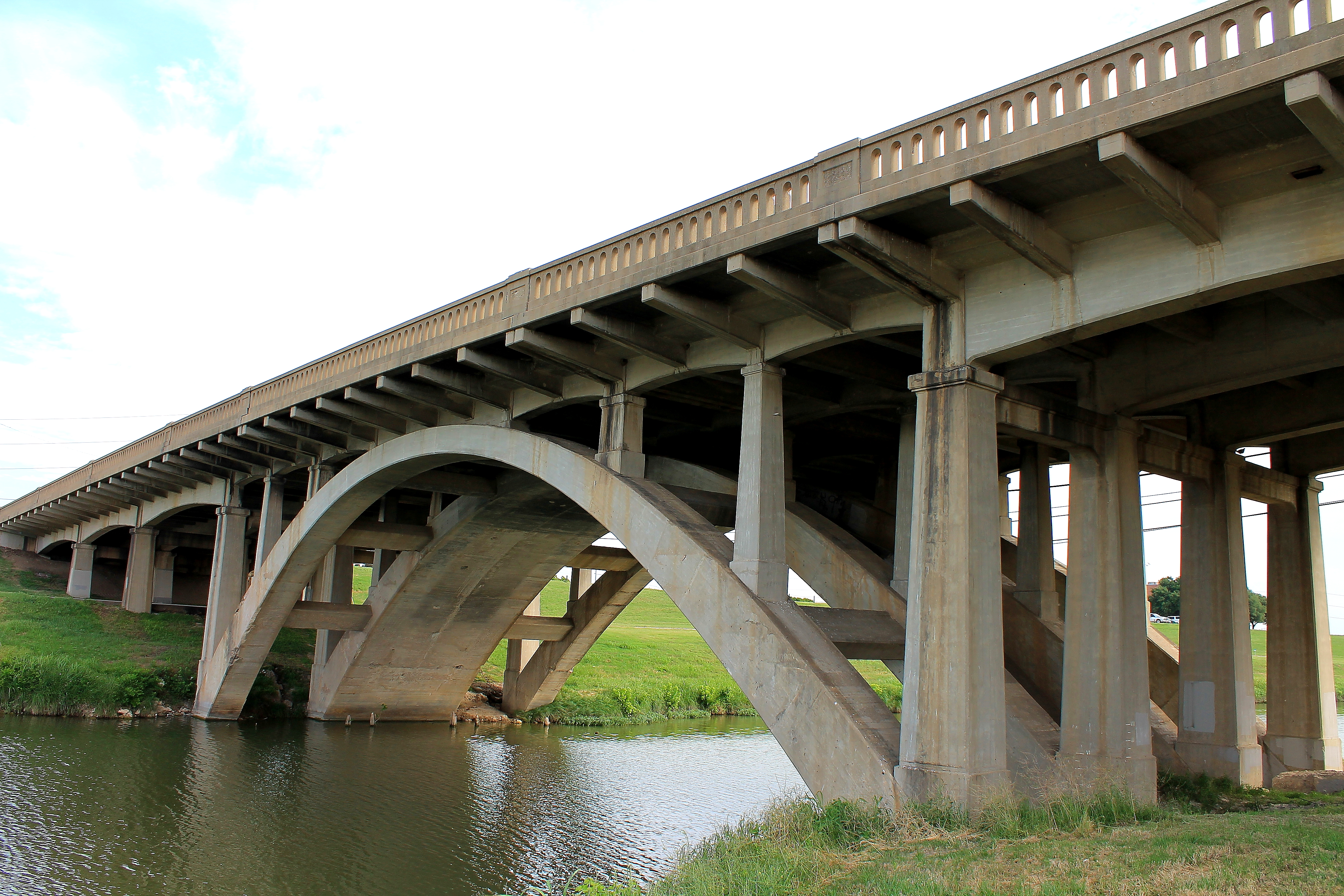
- Henderson Street Bridge in 2012

- Location within Texas Location within the United States
- Location: Henderson Street at the Clear Fork of the Trinity River, Fort Worth, Texas
- Coordinates: 32°45′29″N 97°20′32″W
- Area: 1.4 acres (0.57 ha)
- Built: 1930
- Built by: Dudley Lewis, Frank Parrott
- Architect: I.G. Hendrick, C.M. Thelin
- Architectural style: Open Spandrel Concrete Arch
- MPS: Historic Bridges of Texas MPS
- NRHP reference No.: 11000128
- Added to NRHP: March 21, 2011

Henderson Street Bridge is located in Fort Worth, Texas. It was erected in 1930. The bridge spans over the Clear Fork of the Trinity River.

It was added to the National Register of Historic Places as part of the Historic Bridges of Texas MPS on March 21, 2011.

== Photo gallery ==
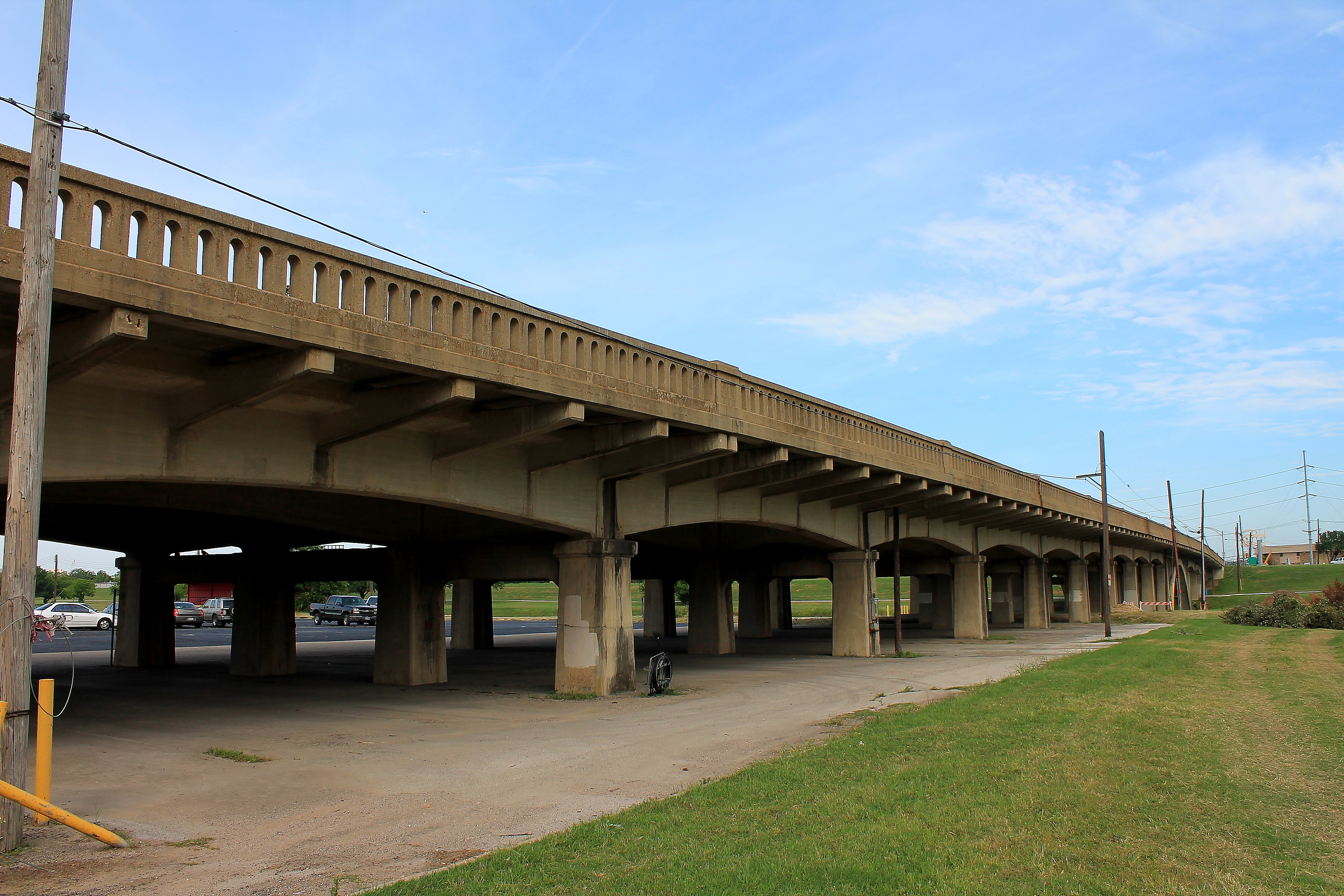

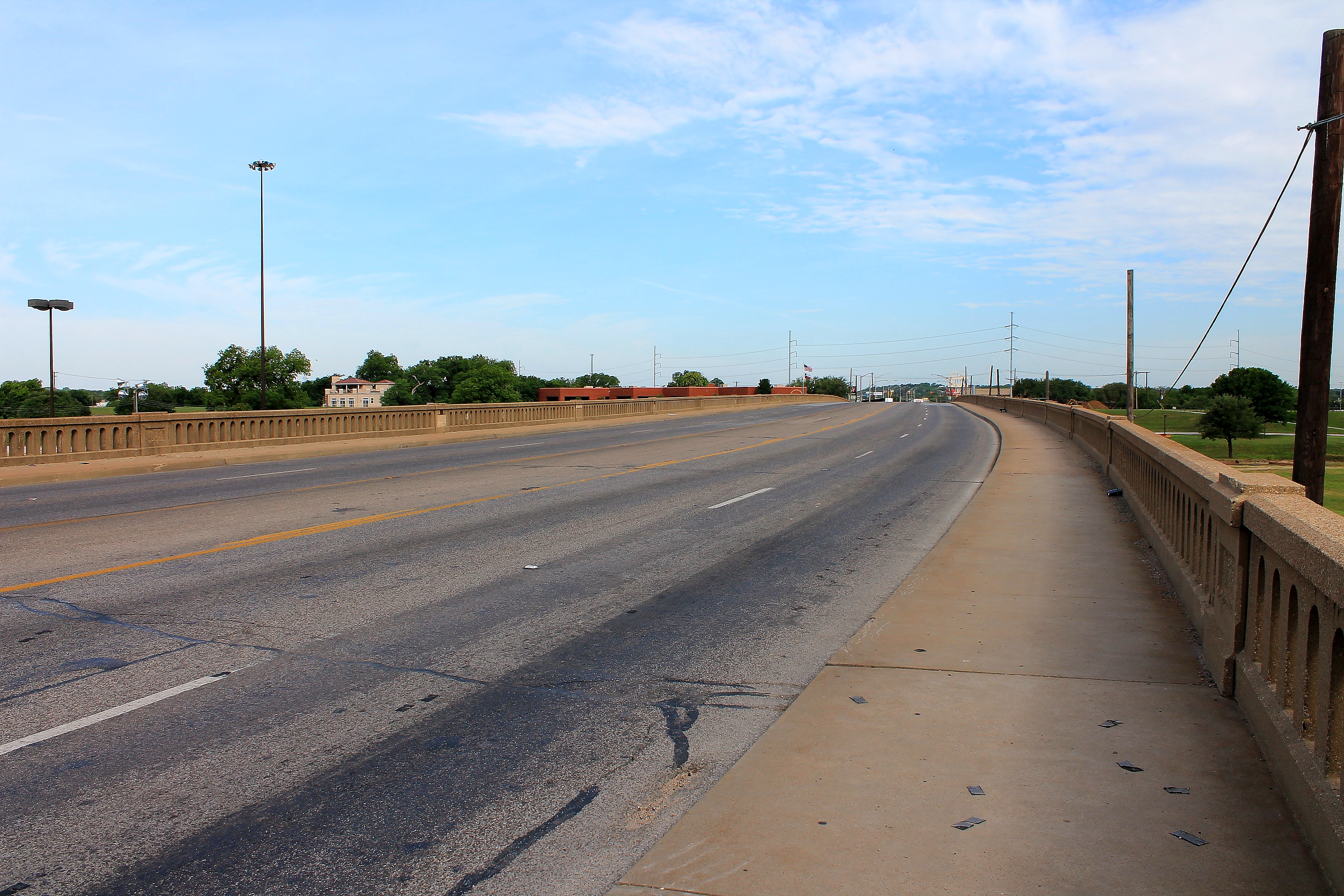

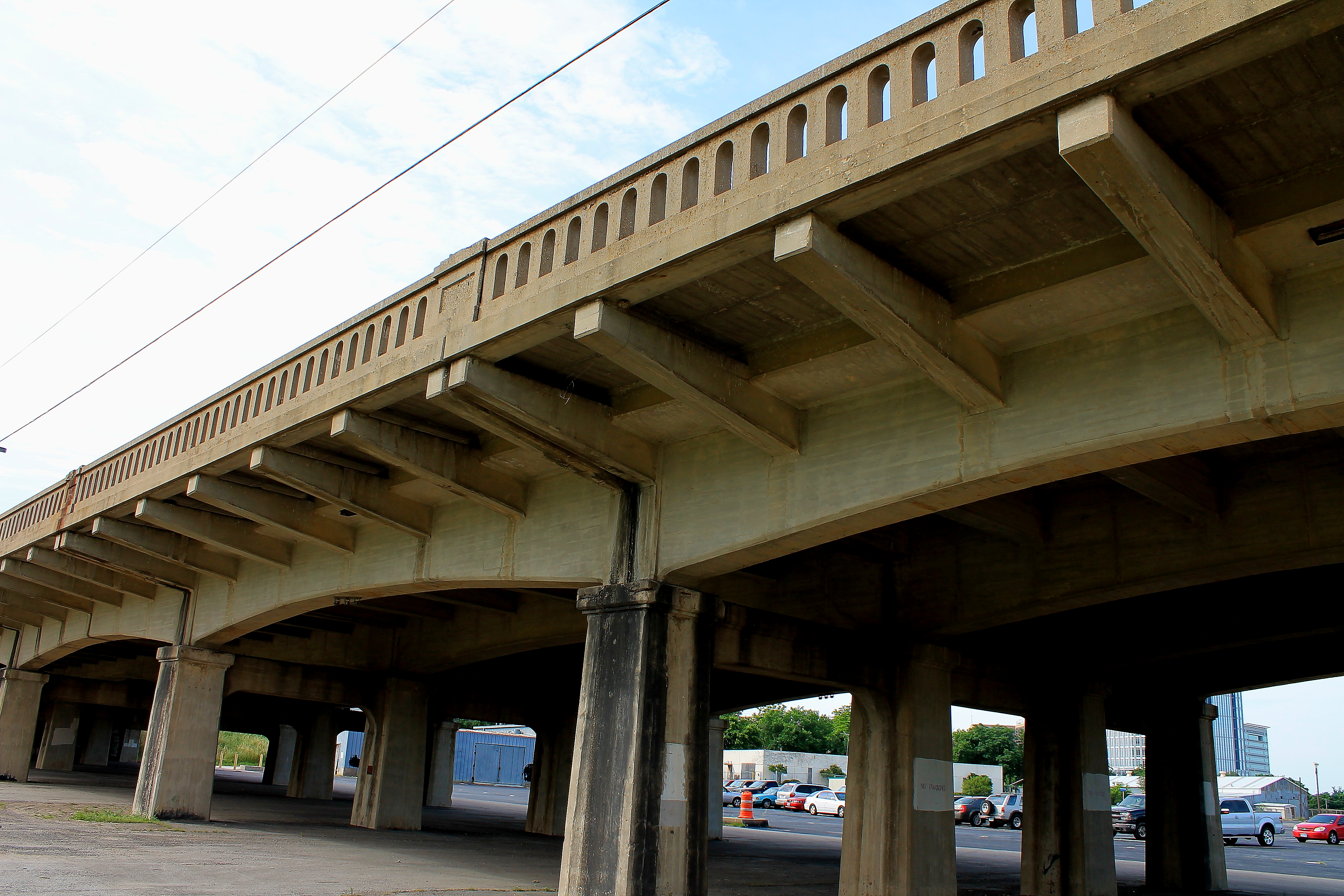

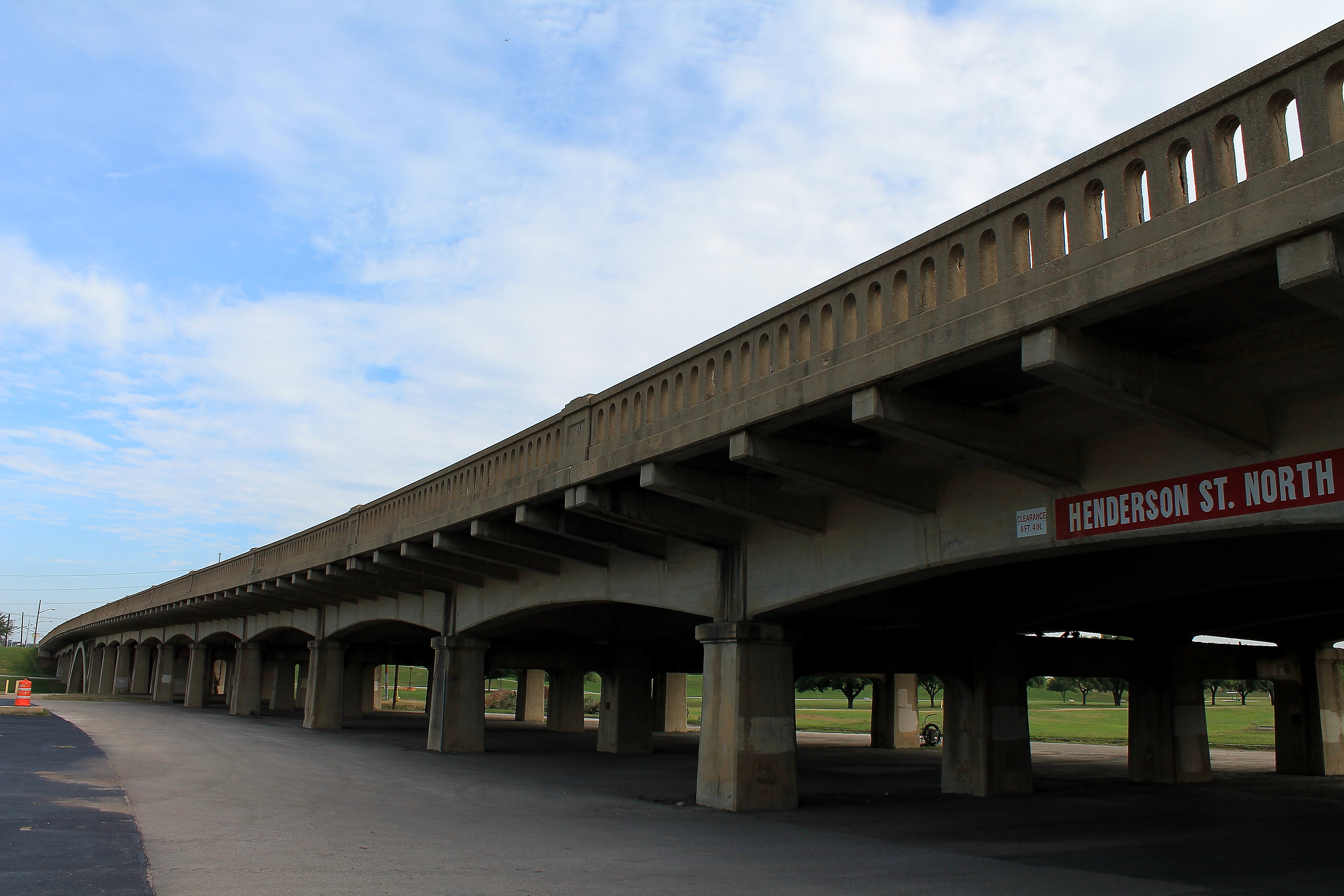

== See also ==
- National Register of Historic Places listings in Tarrant County, Texas
- List of bridges on the National Register of Historic Places in Texas
