= Westworth Village, Texas =

- City
- City of Westworth Village
- Motto: "The Hidden Jewel of the Metroplex"
- Location of Westworth Village in Tarrant County, Texas
- Coordinates: 32°45′36″N 97°25′26″W
- Country: United States
- State: Texas
- County: Tarrant

Area
  - Total: 2.08 sq mi (5.40 km^{2})
  - Land: 2.07 sq mi (5.37 km^{2})
  - Water: 0.012 sq mi (0.03 km^{2})
- Elevation: 600 ft (180 m)

Population (2020)
  - Total: 2,585
  - Density: 1,250/sq mi (481/km^{2})
- Time zone: UTC-6 (CST)
  - Summer (DST): UTC-5 (CDT)
- ZIP code: 76114
- Area code: 817
- FIPS code: 48-78064
- GNIS feature ID: 2412244
- Website: Westworth Village, Texas

Westworth Village is a city in Tarrant County, Texas, United States. The population was 2,585 at the 2020 census.

== History ==
The town's growth was helped in large part by the construction and development of Carswell Air Force Base. In 1941, the Fort Worth Chamber of Commerce deeded 1,400 acres to the federal government for the construction of the base, and the town was incorporated the same year.

== Geography ==
According to the United States Census Bureau, the city has a total area of 2.0 square miles (5.2 km^{2}), all land.

=== Climate ===
The climate in this area is characterized by hot, humid summers and generally mild to cool winters. According to the Köppen Climate Classification system, Westworth Village has a humid subtropical climate, abbreviated "Cfa" on climate maps.

== Demographics ==
Historical population
Census	Pop.	Note	%±
1950	529		—
1960	3,321		527.8%
1970	4,578		37.9%
1980	3,651		−20.2%
1990	2,350		−35.6%
2000	2,124		−9.6%
2010	2,472		16.4%
2020	2,585		4.6%
U.S. Decennial Census

=== 2020 census ===
As of the 2020 census, Westworth Village had a population of 2,585, with 1,138 households and 672 families residing in the city. The median age was 37.0 years, 20.5% of residents were under the age of 18, and 19.3% were 65 years of age or older. For every 100 females there were 99.5 males, and for every 100 females age 18 and over there were 95.8 males age 18 and over.

Of the households in Westworth Village, 29.4% had children under the age of 18 living in them, 42.9% were married-couple households, 22.8% were households with a male householder and no spouse or partner present, and 28.2% were households with a female householder and no spouse or partner present. About 32.8% of all households were made up of individuals and 11.8% had someone living alone who was 65 years of age or older.

There were 1,233 housing units, of which 7.7% were vacant. The homeowner vacancy rate was 4.3% and the rental vacancy rate was 8.1%.

100.0% of residents lived in urban areas, while 0.0% lived in rural areas.

Racial composition as of the 2020 census
Race	Number	Percent
White	1,750	67.7%
Black or African American	133	5.1%
American Indian and Alaska Native	56	2.2%
Asian	52	2.0%
Native Hawaiian and Other Pacific Islander	11	0.4%
Some other race	182	7.0%
Two or more races	401	15.5%
Hispanic or Latino (of any race)	725	28.0%

== Education ==
Westworth Village is served by the Fort Worth Independent School District.

Schools that serve Westworth Village include:

- Burton Hill Elementary School (Ft.Worth)
- Stripling Middle School (Fort Worth)
- Arlington Heights High School (Fort Worth)

== Infrastructure ==
=== Police Department ===
The Westworth Village Police Department, based out of the Westworth Village Justice Center, serves the city.

=== Naval Air Station ===
The Naval Air Station Joint Reserve Base Fort Worth has some territory in Westworth Village.
