= History of the Jews in Natchez, Mississippi =

The history of the Jews in Natchez, Mississippi starts before the 1840s, and most likely precedes verifiable records. By the late 19th century, the Jewish population of Natchez reached roughly 5%, which was higher than other places in the state of Mississippi. Many of these Jewish residents co-mingled with the local white non-Jewish planters and landowners, some Natchez Jews even owned slaves and fought in the Confederate States Army. By the 21st century the Jewish population of Natchez has dropped to around a dozen residents, in part due to the economic downturn.

== 18th century: the colonial era ==
=== French colonial empire ===
It is unclear when the earliest Jewish settlers arrived in Natchez, but it was most likely during the colonial period in the early 18th century. In 1722, the French of the French colonial empire instated the Black Code, which barred Jewish residents from the French North American colonies. It is thought that most likely Jewish settlers came to Natchez during the time period of the French, as the laws were not always enforced.

=== Kingdom of New Spain ===
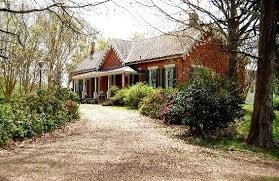
Glenfield Plantation, once owned by Benjamin Monsanto

The 18th century Spanish of the Kingdom of New Spain imposed Jewish voting restrictions. Benjamin Monsanto, of the Monsanto family, and the owner of the Glenfield Plantation which used enslaved labor, was an 18th-century Jewish resident of Natchez. In 1798, Jews conducted orthodox services in Natchez, and they had a cemetery on S. Canal Street. Under the Spanish rule, Natchez went from growing tobacco and cattle farming to growing cotton, something that continued for the next century. Cotton farming required more labor, and was often worked by enslaved African people; and by the early 19th century Natchez became a major site for the slave trade.

== 19th century: commerce, and the American civil war ==
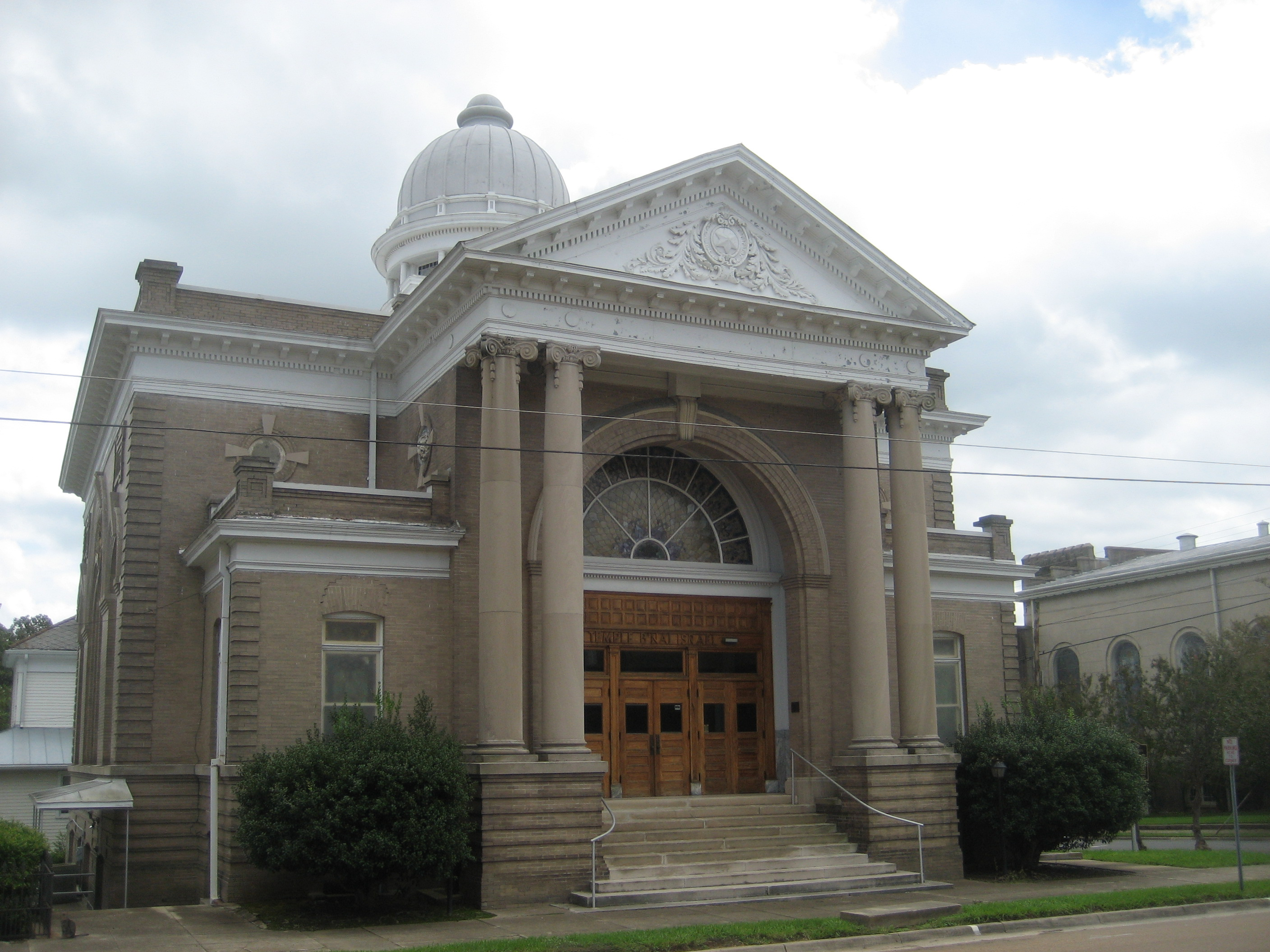
Temple B'Nai Israel in the Natchez-On-Top-of-the-Hill Historic District

=== Early Jewish community ===
The majority of the Natchez residents that were Jewish had immigrated during a second period of immigration in the early 19th century from Alsace–Lorraine (then a territory of the German Empire) and the Kingdom of Bavaria, and they gravitated toward dry goods and clothing merchant roles in the neighborhood of Natchez Under-the-Hill. The first merchant was John Mayer, who arrived in 1841 from New Orleans and worked as a tailor and merchant in Natchez for multiple decades. He was followed by fellow Jewish merchants in Natchez, including Solomon Schatz, Solomon Bloom (or Solomon Blum), David Moses, Aaron Beekman, I. David, Joseph Tillman, and Simon Adler. Towards the end of the 19th century other Jewish professions came to Natchez, included A.H. Geisenberg, a surgeon; Sim H. Lowenburg, an attorney; Julius Lemkowitz, an attorney; and Cassius Tillman, a deputy sheriff, county treasurer, and tobacco merchant.

The Temple B'nai Israel in Natchez congregation was formed in 1840, and the temple was built in 1905. By the 1870s, Temple B'nai Israel in Natchez was also the largest Jewish congregation in the state, and one-third of all mercantile businesses in the city of Natchez were owned by members of this temple.

A group of German-speaking immigrants who were merchants purchased land for a cemetery in Natchez in 1840. The group was led by Moses Hasan and Joseph Deutch, and established a chevra kadisha (Jewish burial society) in Natchez. Around 1860, the group disbanded for a year due to the upcoming war. In the late 18th century, Jewish residents were holding Jewish minyan prayer services.

Jews were not major landowners in Natchez, and tended to not own large quantities of enslaved people. However Jacob Soria, was a Natchez Jew who owned a human commodity auction house that sold enslaved people.

=== American civil war ===
During the outbreak of the American Civil War, Natchez Jews usually supported the Confederate States Army with many joining the cause. Simon Mayer became a major in the Confederate States Army. A few of the Natchez Jews formed close social ties with the Union Army's Jewish sutlers, and two of John Mayer's daughters marrying two of the sutlers. By 1862, Natchez was under the Union Army control, with relatively small amount of property damage or physical violence. One Natchez Jewish causality from the war was Rosalie Beekman, the 7-year-old daughter of merchant Aaron Beekman.

After the emancipation of enslaved Black people in Natchez, the city experienced rapid change. Plantation owners sold their land in order to secure cash, and the plantation system switched to sharecropping and tenant farming. In the post-war society, merchants became socially important which gained the Jewish Natchez population social and political power. By the late 19th century, Natchez had roughly a 5% Jewish population, which was significantly higher than other places in the state of Mississippi. By 1877, there were 28 Jewish-owned shops in Natchez, making up more than half the dry goods and cotton-buying operations in the city.

The Standard Club was a Jewish social club on the corner of Franklin Street and Pearl Street, where they hosted balls, dances, billiards, and other social events in the 1890s. The Prentiss Club was an all-male social club which allowed Jewish members on the corner of Pearl Street and Jefferson Street.

== 20th century ==
From 1899 to 1914, Rabbi Seymour Bottigheimer from Virginia led the Natchez congregation, which provided the first stable rabbi in the community. The peak of the Natchez Jewish population by numbers happened in 1902, with 450 residents.

In 1903, a fire broke out at the Temple B’nai Israel, and the Jewish congregation made plans for a new synagogue. The Natchez Methodist congregation allowed the Jewish congregation worship in their church temporarily, while many affluent white Christians from the city donated to the synagogue's rebuild fund. The new Temple B’nai Israel building was completed in 1905, with a reported 600 people in attendance including Jewish people from surrounding cities.

Around 1907, the boll weevil arrived in Natchez, decimating the cotton crops. Several Jewish businesses closed in the following years, and synagogue lost members. From 1913 to 1950, the synagogue struggled with holding a rabbi. By 1927, Natchez had one-third of the Jewish population found at its peak, with only 150 Jewish residents. In 1927, Isadore Levy (who was from New Orleans, and born to a Jewish father but did not practice Judaism) and his sons built the Eola Hotel in Natchez, which remained open until the Wall Street crash of 1929. By 1936, there were nineteen businesses in Natchez under Jewish ownership, including Geisenberger & Friedler, Abrams Department Store, and Krouse Pecan Co.. Jewish resident Saul Laub served as mayor of Natchez, from 1929 to 1934. In 1935, Jewish resident Jane Wexler served as queen of the Natchez Pilgrimage, a Confederate–themed festival celebrating the antebellum era of the city and which awarded royal court titles in a pageant.

By the 1940s, Temple B’nai Israel only had roughly 90 members, with majority of members living in Natchez and some of the members coming from nearby Fayette, Bude, Lorman, Ferriday, Waterproof, and Winnsboro. By 1979, less than thirty families still attended the synagogue.

== 21st century ==
In the 1990s, the Museum of the Southern Jewish Experience in Utica, Mississippi (now in New Orleans) offered historical tours of Jewish Natchez, which were mentioned in a 1998 newspaper article in The New York Times.

By 2010, only around a dozen Jewish residents still lived in Natchez.

== List of notable Jews from Natchez ==
- Saul Laub, former mayor of Natchez from 1929 to 1935
- Benjamin Monsanto
- Henry Jacobs, the first Jewish immigrant and resident to receive U.S. citizenship in the 1790s

== See also ==
- History of the Jews in the Southern United States
- History of the Jews in the United States
- Museum of the Southern Jewish Experience in New Orleans
