= H. A. Overbeck =

American architect (1861–1942)

Harry A. Overbeck
- Born: July 19, 1861; Cincinnati, Ohio, U.S.
- Died: January 20, 1942
- Resting place: Restland Memorial Park
- Education: Massachusetts Institute of Technology, Ohio Architectural and Mechanical Institute
- Occupation: Architect
- Spouse: May B. Pettigrew

Harry A. Overbeck (1861–1942) was an American architect. He was active in Omaha, Nebraska and then for most of his career in Dallas, Texas. He designed several prominent buildings including a Mississippi Landmark and properties on the National Register of Historic Places.

== Early life and education ==
Harry A. Overbeck was born on July 19, 1861, in Cincinnati, Ohio. He father was a contractor, whom he worked under for few early years. His brother J. Edward Overbeck was also an architect.

Overbeck continued his studies at Massachusetts Institute of Technology (MIT), and the Ohio Architectural and Mechanical Institute. He married May B. Pettigrew from Kansas City, Missouri.

== Career ==
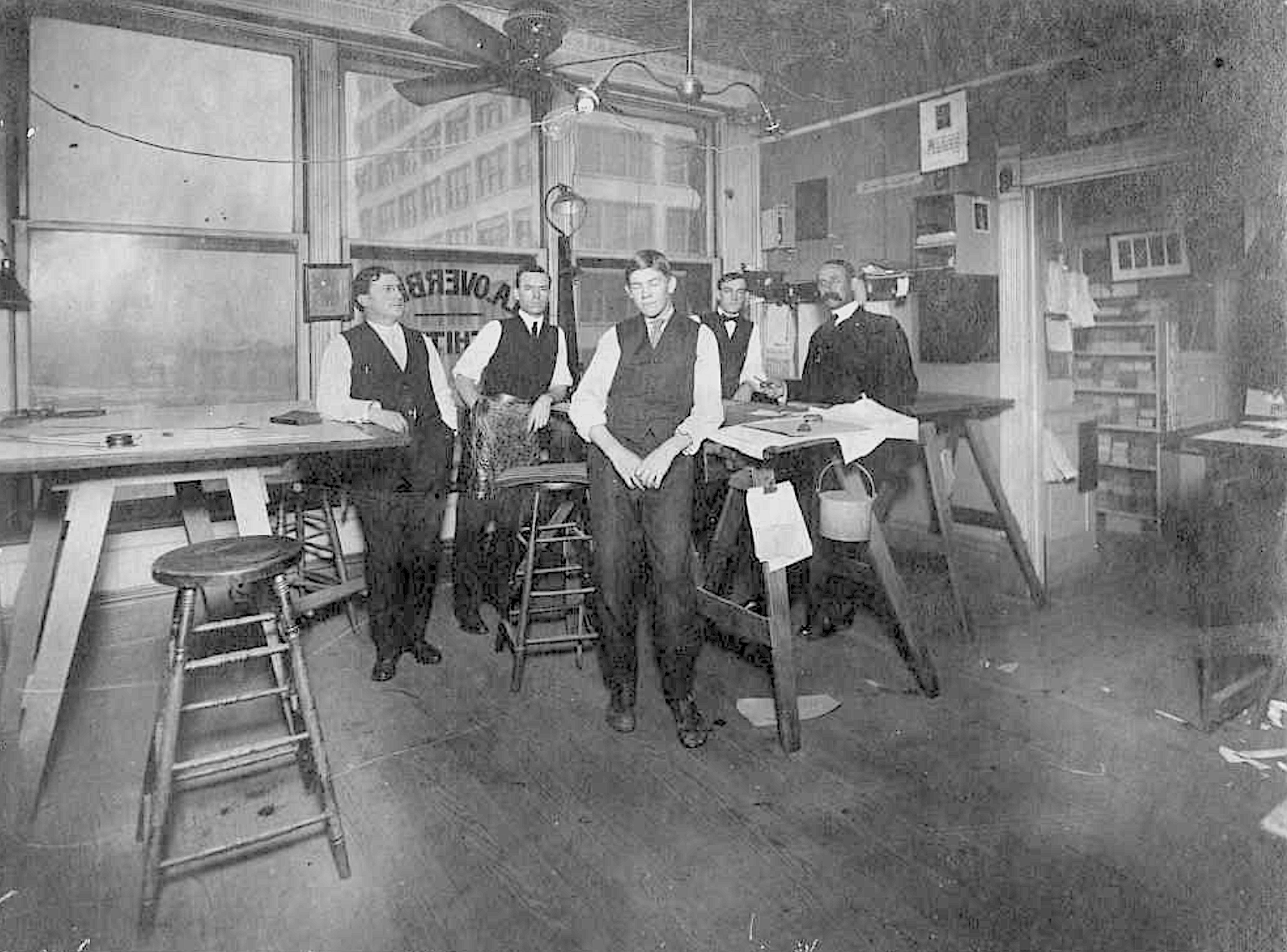
The staff and office of Harry A. Overbeck, Dallas architect (c. 1900 – c. 1910)

In his early career he worked briefly in Minneapolis and St. Paul, Minnesota, before established an architecture firm around 1885 in Omaha, Nebraska. His work for the state fair in Omaha led to a commission for the Texas State Fair Association and brought him to Dallas in 1895. He had an office in the Slaughter Building in Dallas.

In 1914, Overbeck was chosen as the president of the Texas State Association of Architects. His 1917 plans for designing a "humane" county jail in Dallas (known as Tom Green County Jail), included a pipe organ for music; but the state commissioners bailed on raising the funds, and his fundraising efforts stopped due to the activities around World War I. He was involved in overseeing the removal of the clock tower from the Dallas County Courthouse in 1919. In 1927, he became a member of the American Institute of Architects (AIA) College of Fellows.

He died on January 20, 1942, and is buried in Restland Memorial Park in Dallas. The Southern Methodist University (SMU) libraries houses The George W. Cook Dallas/Texas Image Collection, which contains a 1900s photograph of Overbeck's office and its staff.

== List of works ==
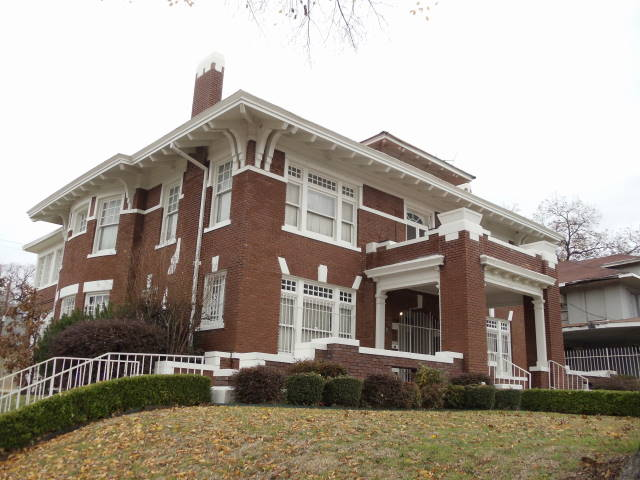
Levi–Topletz House (c. 1914) in Dallas, Texas

- Linz Building (1898), Dallas, Texas; demolished in 1963
- Temple Emanu-El (c. 1898), Dallas, Texas; synagogue that became a Unitarian church, before being demolished in 1961 for a highway project
- Temple B'nai Israel (1905), Natchez, Mississippi; listed as a Mississippi Landmark
- Hebrew Union Temple (1906), Greenville, Mississippi
- Levi–Topletz House (c. 1914), Dallas, Texas; listed on the National Register of Historic Places
- Levi–Moses House (c. 1915), Dallas, Texas; listed on the National Register of Historic Places
- Dallas Fire Station No. 16 (1917), Dallas, Texas
- Missouri–Kansas–Texas Railroad (MKT) headquarters (1912–1914), 701 Commerce Street in West End Historic District, Dallas, Texas; now known as the Katy Building
- Crane Building (1909), Dallas, Texas; which was fireproof
- Hale County Courthouse (1910), Plainview, Texas
- Hughes Brothers Manufacturing / Gulf Cone Building (1903), Dallas, Texas
- Texas Moline Plow Building (1903), at 302 North Market, Dallas, Texas
- Purse and Company Building (1905) at 601 Elm, Dallas, Texas
- St. Paul's Hospital (1898), Dallas, Texas; formerly known as St. Paul's Sanatorium, demolished 1968
- Dallas County Jail and Criminal Courts building (1915), at 500 Main Street, Dallas, Texas
- Holy Trinity College building (1906), Dallas, Texas; a precursor of Dallas University, demolished 1963
- L. G. Bromberg House in the South Boulevard-Park Row Historic District, Dallas, Texas
- Peter Farrell House in Munger Place, Dallas, Texas
