= Dallas Fire Station No. 16 =

- U.S. National Register of Historic Places
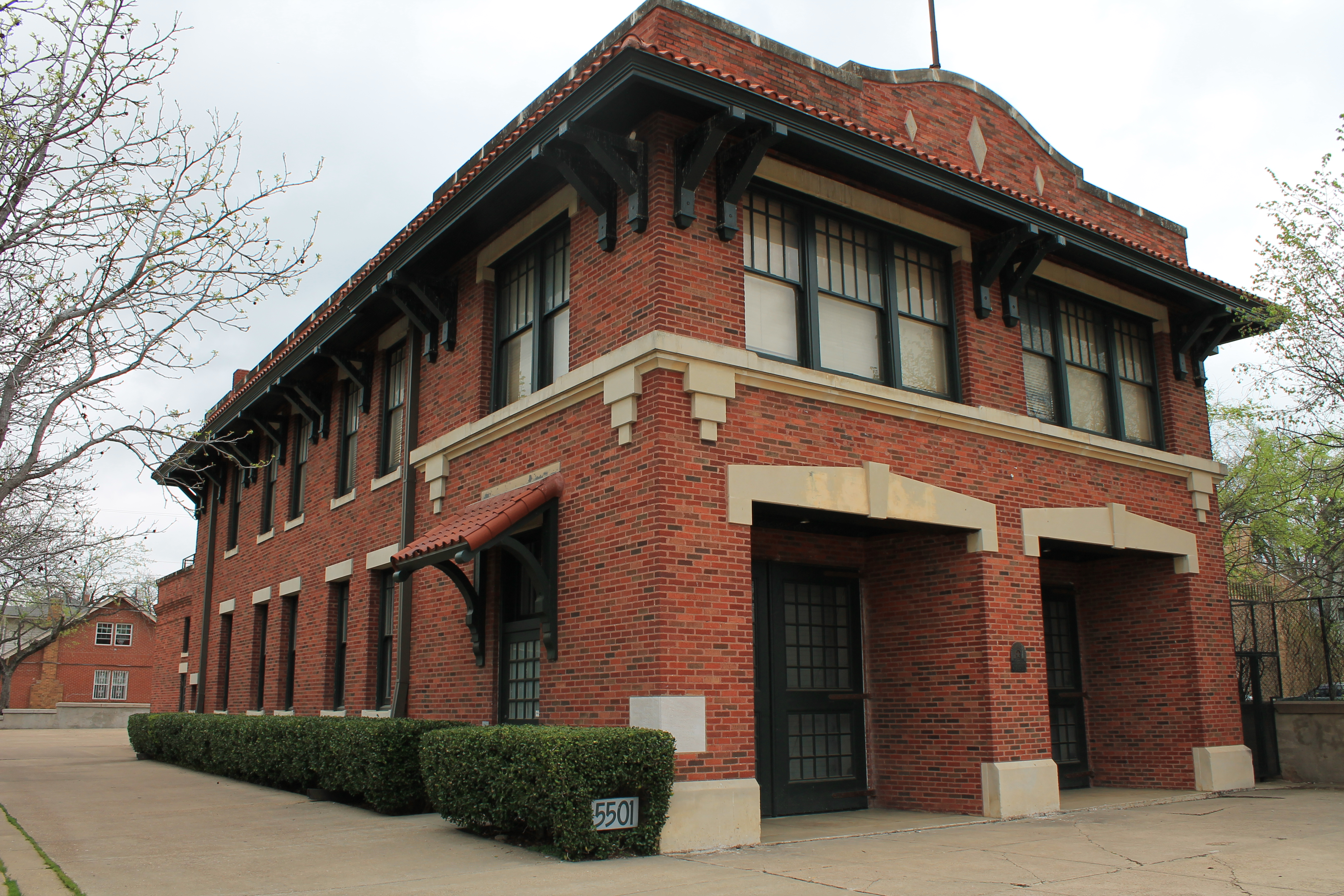
- Fire Station No. 16 in 2012

- Location within Texas Location within the United States
- Location: 5501 Columbia Ave., Dallas, Texas
- Coordinates: 32°47′56″N 96°45′18″W
- Area: less than one acre
- Built: 1917
- Built by: G. G. Johnson
- Architect: H. A. Overbeck
- Architectural style: Prairie School, Mission/Spanish Revival
- NRHP reference No.: 97000363
- Added to NRHP: April 17, 1997

Dallas Fire Station No. 16, at 5501 Columbia Ave. in Dallas, Texas, was built in 1917. It was listed on the National Register of Historic Places in 1997.

It is a two-story red brick building designed by architect H. A. Overbeck. It has a "curvilinear Mission Revival parapet, cast stone geometric detailing, and knee brackets supporting a shed roof with red clay tiles." It also incorporates Prairie School architecture.

== See also ==
- National Register of Historic Places listings in Dallas County, Texas
