= Katy Building =

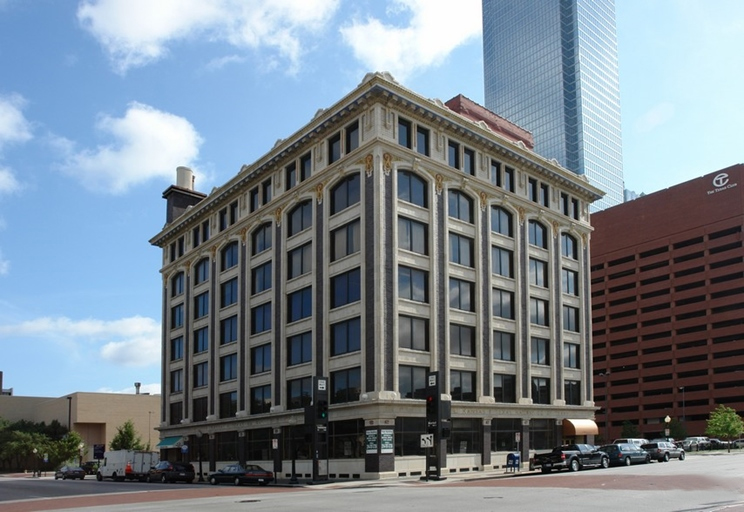
- Interactive map of the Katy Building area

General information
- Type: Commercial offices
- Location: 701 Commerce Street Dallas, Texas, 75202
- Coordinates: 32.778528°N 96.805611°W
- Completed: 1914
- Owner: Novel Coworking
- Management: Novel Coworking

Height
- Roof: 30.18 m (99.0 ft)

Technical details
- Floor count: 8

Design and construction
- Architect: H. A. Overbeck

The Katy Building is an eight-floor historic building located in downtown Dallas' West End Historic District at 701 Commerce St. The Katy Building was constructed from 1912–1914 for Dallas businessman Col. John M. Simpson. For over 50 years, the 57,500-square-foot building served as the headquarters for the Missouri–Kansas–Texas Railroad (MKT), which gave the building its name (Katy, short for KT).

The seven-story, terra cotta and masonry building was designed by H. A. Overbeck in the Beaux-Arts/Historism style. It featured fire proof construction, office spaces, and a power plant in the basement. Although the MKT occupied most of the building as their headquarters, rental space was available for other businesses as well. While the interior of the building has been extensively renovated over the years, the historic character of the building has been preserved.

== Current use ==
Workspace provider Novel Coworking purchased the Katy Building in 2014 and renovated the building's interior to provide private offices and co-working space for entrepreneurs and small businesses that need flexible, short-term workspace.

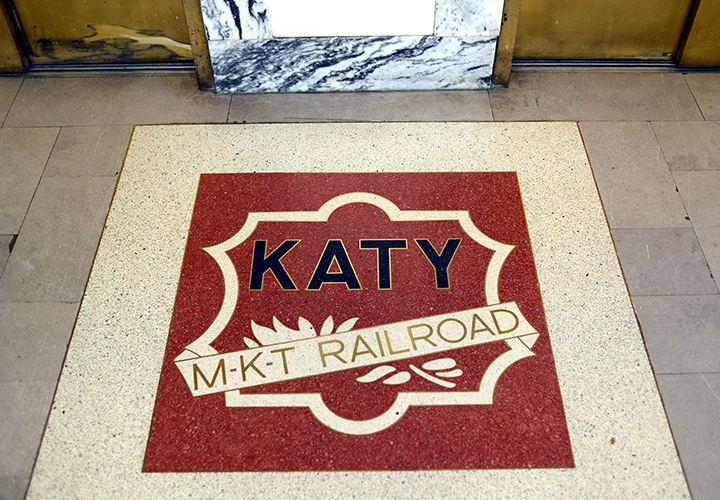
Historic plaque inside building
