= Temple B'nai Israel (Natchez, Mississippi) =

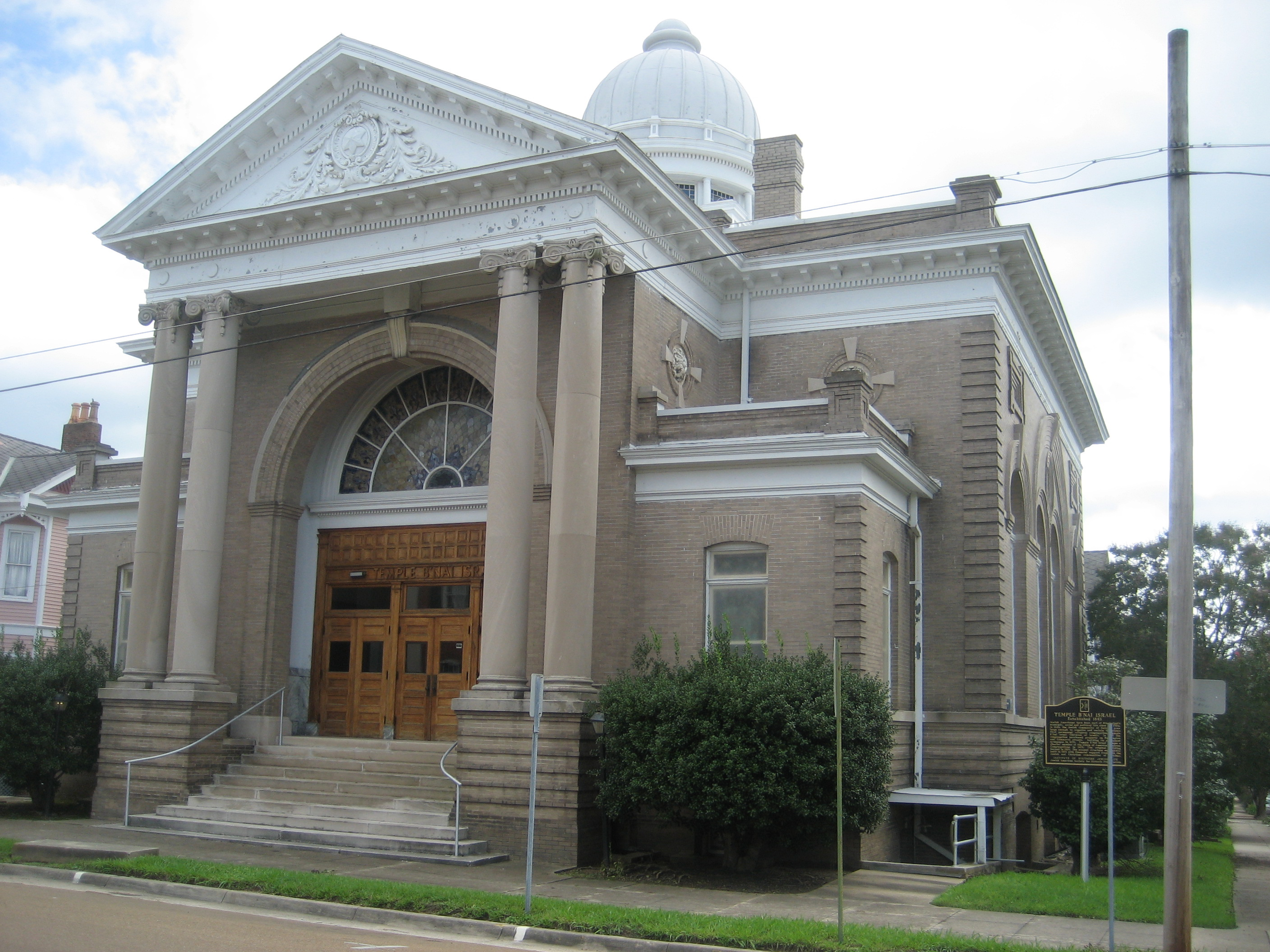

Religion
- Affiliation: Judaism

Location
- Location: 213 S. Commerce St. Natchez, Mississippi, U.S.
- Coordinates: 31.557918°N 91.403798°W

Architecture
- Architect: H. A. Overbeck
- Established: 1905
- Designated as NHL: Mississippi Landmark
- Designated: September 11, 2002

Temple B'nai Israel is a synagogue built in 1905 and located at 213 South Commerce Street in the Natchez On-Top-of-the-Hill Historic District in Natchez, Mississippi. The congregation is the oldest in the state, established in 1840. The building is listed as a Mississippi Landmark since 2002.

== Pre-history of the building ==
The congregation was formed in 1840 during a second wave of Jewish immigration to the area, and it is the oldest Jewish congregation in the state of Mississippi. In 1866, a German immigrant named Samuel Ullman sought for the congregation to adopt Jewish Reform traditions that would include women and children, and his idea which eventually won out.

By the 1870s, Temple B'nai Israel in Natchez was also the largest Jewish congregation in the state, and one-third of all mercantile businesses in the city of Natchez were owned by members of this temple. From 1899 to 1913, Rabbi Seymour Bottigheimer from Virginia led the Natchez congregation, which provided the first stable rabbi in the community. in 1903, the Temple B'nai Israel was destroyed in a fire, and the congregation made plans for a new building. The Methodist congregation temporarily allowed the Jewish congregation worship in their church, while many affluent white Christians from Natchez donated to the synagogue's rebuild fund.

== History of the building ==
The architect of the present building was H. A. Overbeck, he had previously designed a synagogue in Dallas, Texas. The cornerstone for the building was laid in July 1904, and the space was dedicated on March 25, 1905, with Rabbi Isaac Mayer Wise of Cincinnati and more than 600 in attendance. The design of this temple may have influenced Overbeck's similarly designed Hebrew Union Temple, built in 1906 in Greenville, Mississippi. The new Beaux-Arts style building featured arched stained glass windows, a central dome, and an ornate ark made in Italian marble. It was designed to accommodate 450 people seated, with a balcony.

The building was part of the history exhibition, From Alsace to America: Discovering Southern Jewish Heritage (1998) sponsored by the Museum of the Southern Jewish Experience. By 2010, only around a dozen Jewish residents lived in Natchez.

== See also ==
- National Register of Historic Places listings in Adams County, Mississippi
