= Levi–Topletz House =

Historic building in Dallas, Texas, U.S.

- U.S. National Register of Historic Places
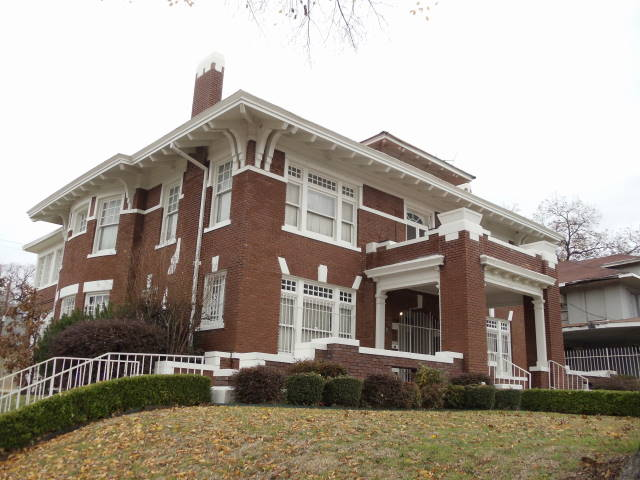
- Location: 2603 Martin Luther King Jr. Blvd., Dallas, Texas, U.S.
- Coordinates: 32°46′02″N 96°46′13″W
- Area: less than one acre
- Built: 1914
- Architect: H.A. Overbeck
- Architectural style: Renaissance
- MPS: East and South Dallas MPS
- NRHP reference No.: 95000317
- Added to NRHP: March 23, 1995

Levi–Topletz House is a historic brick residential building in Dallas, Texas, U.S.. It displays elements and characteristic of the Italian Renaissance revival and Prairie School styles. It is one of the few residences of the Edgewood Addition (1912) that is surviving on Martin Luther King, Jr. Boulevard (formerly Forest Avenue), the principal streetcar route across the South Dallas neighborhood. The original owner of the house was Jewish businessman, Leo S. Levi, who commissioned the building.

It has been listed on the National Register of Historic Places since 1995, for the architecture. The building is associated with the historic context, "The Development of East and South Dallas: 1872–1945". It is also known as Phase IV--East Dallas DAL/DA 9.

== See also ==
- History of the Jews in Dallas
- National Register of Historic Places in Dallas County, Texas
- Levi–Moses House, located nearby and also NRHP-listed
