= Levi–Moses House =

Historic building in Dallas, Texas, U.S.

- U.S. National Register of Historic Places
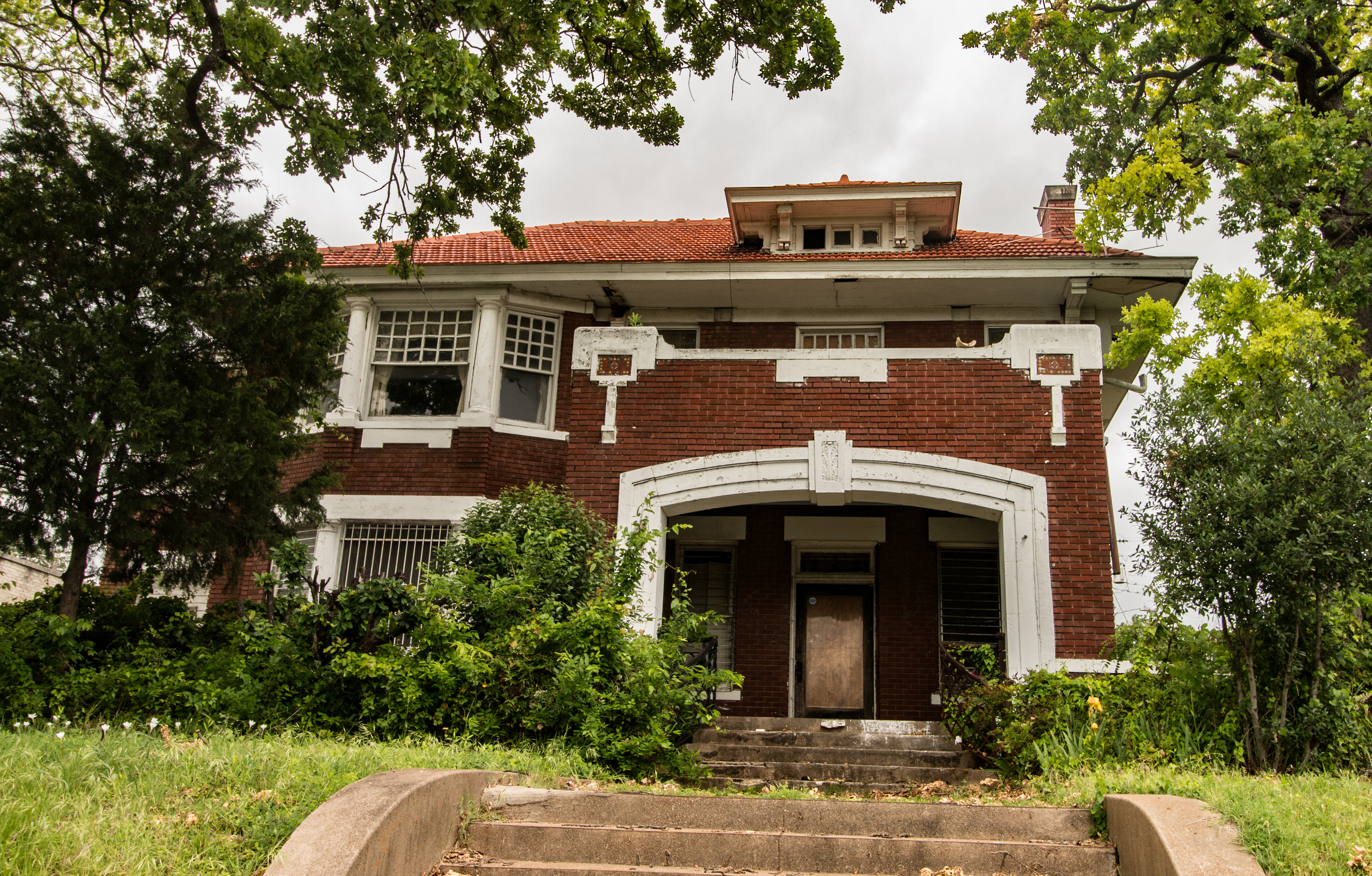
- Location: 2433 Martin Luther King Jr. Blvd., Dallas, Texas, U.S.
- Coordinates: 32°45′56″N 96°46′20″W
- Area: less than one acre
- Built: 1915
- Architect: H.A. Overbeck
- Architectural style: Renaissance
- MPS: East and South Dallas MPS
- NRHP reference No.: 95000316
- Added to NRHP: March 23, 1995

Levi–Moses House is a historic residential building in Dallas, Texas, U.S.. It was designed by architect H. A. Overbeck with elements of Italianate, Renaissance revival, and Prairie School styles. It is one of the few residences of the Edgewood Addition (1912) that is surviving on Martin Luther King, Jr. Boulevard (formerly Forest Avenue), the principal streetcar route across the South Dallas neighborhood. The Edgewood Addition was home to many prominent Jewish families who built their homes near Temple Emanu-El (which is no longer existing in that location). The original owner of the house was Charles G. Levi and then his son-in-law Jacob Moses who succeeded him.

It has been listed on the National Register of Historic Places since 1995, for the architecture. It is also known as Phase IV--East Dallas DAL/DA 16.

== See also ==
- History of the Jews in Dallas
- National Register of Historic Places in Dallas County, Texas
- Levi–Topletz House, located nearby and also NRHP-listed
