= Monsanto family =

Sephardic Jewish merchant and banking business family

The Monsanto family is a historical Sephardic Jewish merchant and banking business who played a significant role in founding the Jewish community in Colonial Louisiana (then transferring between French and Spanish rule) in the 18th century. They had originated in the Iberian Peninsula but moved to Amsterdam and spread out through the Dutch Empire and to the Americas at Curaçao. The family arrived in Louisiana in the 1760s, and one of their members, Isaac Monsanto, was one of the wealthiest merchants in New Orleans. The family engaged in the Atlantic slave trade and owned African slaves at their plantations at Natchez, Mississippi (this was later known as Glenfield Plantation) and Trianon, New Orleans. Not including their former estate in New Orleans, by the 1780s, the Monsantos kept 51 slaves for their personal use and sold other enslaved African people to Louisiana plantations.

== History ==
The Monsanto family were Sephardic Jews, who derive their name from Monsanto (meaning "Holy Mountain"), a village in Portugal. They had lived for a time as Marranos; people who outwardly conformed to the Catholic Church but continued to practice Judaism in private. They were active in trade in Andalusia, Spain (they were located at Seville and Málaga) for a time during the 17th century, before moving on to Amsterdam, in the United Provinces of the Netherlands during the lifetime of Isaac Rodriguez Monsanto (1645–1695). It is in the Netherlands that the Monsanto brothers who came to the Americas were born. They first moved out across the Atlantic Sea to Curaçao in the Caribbean, which was then part of the Netherlands Antilles.

In the aftermath of the Seven Years' War, with both realms under the House of Bourbon, the Treaty of Fontainebleau (1762) stipulated that French Louisiana, then part of New France, be transferred to New Spain as Spanish Louisiana. The transfer was actually gradual and in a state of flux during the time that the Monsanto family arrived. Previously, Jews were technically barred from living in French America from 1685 onwards under the terms of the Code Noir, though this was not enforced as strictly during the political flux of the mid-1700s and so the Monsanto family were able to operate. This and the end of the Seven Years' War, which meant the opportunity for trade with Europe, attracted Jews to New Orleans who had been involved in the slave trade in the Caribbean (ie - Curaçao, Jamaica and Saint-Domingue) and also the inter-American slave trade between the Caribbean and territories bordering the Gulf of Mexico.

Indeed, it was Isaac Monsanto (died 1778) who was the first member of the family to arrive in New Orleans from Dutch Curaçao, with his fellow Sephardi trade partners; Isaac Henriques Fastio and Manuel de Britto. He developed a strong working relationship with Louis Billouart, Chevalier de Kerlérec, the French Governor, which opened him up to trade with Abraham Gradis, a prominent Jewish merchant in Bordeaux. These Sephardi merchants, along with David Mendes France, Samuel Israel, Joseph Palacios and Alexander Solomons becoming pioneers in founding the Louisiana Jewish community in the 1760s. Aside from Isaac Monsanto, his siblings, who lived with him at first in New Orleans included the brothers Manuel, Benjamin and Jacob Monsanto, as well as the sisters Angélica, Eleanora and Gracia Monsanto. They lived together for a while at Chartres Street in the French Quarter. Isaac Monsanto founded the fortunes of the family and in 1767 purchased a slave plantation at Trianon beyond the city limits of New Orleans and had become one of the richest merchants in the city by 1769. He was also a banker and Superior Court translator; despite a Spanish restrictions on certain forms of trade, Isaac Monsanto funded a British expedition up the Mississippi River to the Illinois territory they had won in the French and Indian War. This illegal trade angered the local Catholic Criollo population who erupted in protests and consequently, the Spanish Governor, Alejandro O'Reilly, expelled the Monsantos and other Jews from New Orleans for their illegal trading in 1769 (though they were not completely pushed out of Louisiana). They then moved out to Manchac near Lake Pontchartrain (then part of British North America), where they were trade partners of John Fitzpatrick and Point Coupee, still part of Spanish Louisiana. Isaac Monsanto would dip in and out of New Orleans itself with little suppression from the Spanish authorities, now that the Sephardim's economic influence had been reduced. The governor Luis de Unzaga Amézaga 'le Conciliateur', characterized by his tolerance and also with Sephardic origins, signed the visas for the merchant Isaac Monsanto and his son Jacob Monsanto, who had businesses between Manchac, Mobile and Pensacola and from 1774 in New Orleans too again.

The Monsanto sisters settled in Pensacola in British Florida and married in quick succession; Pierre André Tessier de Villauchamps (Eleanora), Thomas Topham (Gracia) and George Urquhart (Angélica). Urquhart, a Lowland Scot, was involved in local politics in West Florida. During the American Revolution, Manchac was captured by the Spanish ending Monsanto influence there. After the death of her husband in 1779, Angélica Monsanto married another Lowland Scot, Dr. Robert Dow and returned to New Orleans. After the death of Isaac, the brothers Manuel, Benjamin and Jacob Monsanto continued on their merchant activities. As well as the earlier slave plantation at Trianon, Benjamin Monsanto and his wife Clara owned a 500-acre slave plantation on St Catherine's Creek near Natchez, Mississippi from 1787 onwards (this was later known as Glenfield Plantation). During this time the Monsantos kept 51 Africans as their slaves for personal use (Benjamin owned 17, Angélica owned 8, Eleanora owned 4 and Manuel owned 12) and sold other enslaved Black people to slave plantations owners in Louisiana. One of the biggest slave deals Benjamin Monsanto engaged in occurred in 1785, when he traded thirteen "Negroes" for three thousand pounds of indigo. As well as slaves and indigo, they also traded in liquor, clothes, silverware, lumber, fabric, tea, tobacco, soap, animals furs and horses. As a multilingual and cosmopolitan family who could speak French, Spanish and English, the Monsantos were effective operators among the various different European settlers in the area and even after their "official" expulsion from New Orleans still had strong contacts with the local establishment. Manuel and Jacob Monsanto were back living at Toulouse Street in New Orleans by the mid-1780s. Benjamin Monsanto (died 10 October 1794) was appointed by Manuel Gayoso de Lemos, the Governor of Spanish Louisiana, to teams of citizens who dealt with inventories and appraisals of the slave plantation estates of deceased neighbours. Benjamin Monsanto had a brother, Manuel Jacob Monsanto, who was also prominent in Louisiana, he was known for his involvement in the slave trade where he dealt in African slaves (he engaged in twelve such contracts between 1787 and 1789).

The Monsanto family is the origin of the name of the American agrochemical and agricultural biotechnology corporation Monsanto, which was founded in 1901, in St. Louis, Missouri The founder was John Francis Queeny, who, at age 42, was a 30‑year veteran of the nascent pharmaceutical industry. He funded the firm with his own money and capital from a soft drink distributor. He named the company after his wife's maiden name, Olga Méndez Monsanto, who was an heir of the Monsanto family.

== See also ==
- Pushcarts and Plantations: Jewish Life in Louisiana
- History of the Jews in Curaçao
