= Museum of the Southern Jewish Experience =

Museum in New Orleans, Louisiana

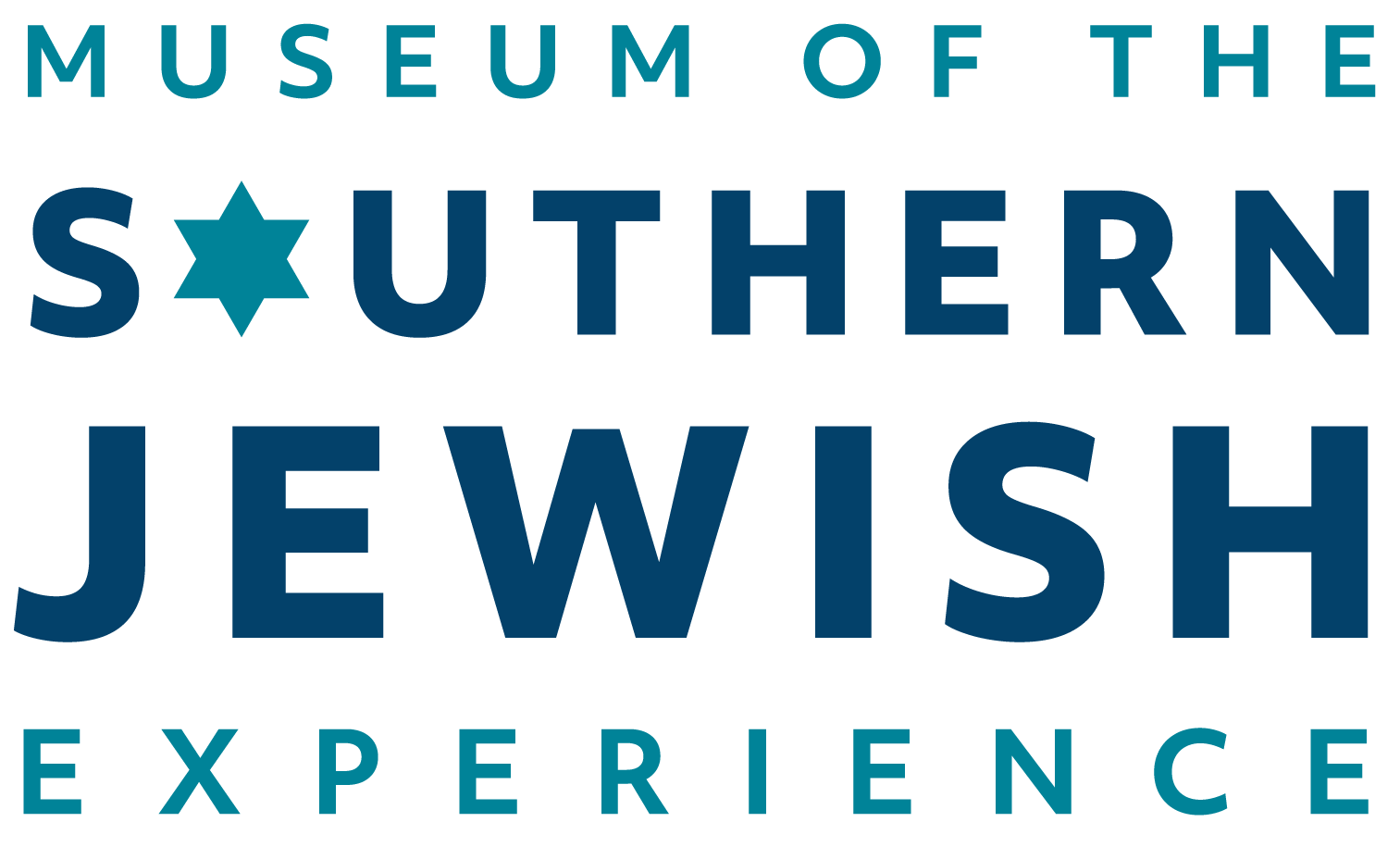

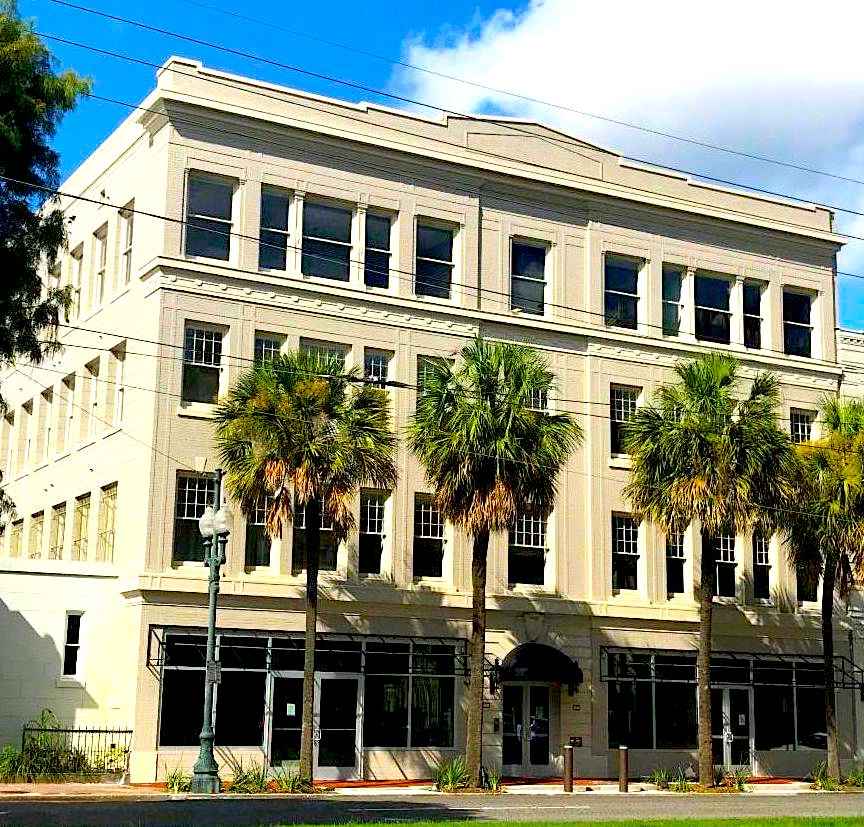
- Established: 1986 in Utica, Mississippi; 2021 in New Orleans
- Location: 818 Howard Avenue, New Orleans, Louisiana
- Type: History, Culture, Religion
- Collections: Judaica, household items, business records, photographs, letters, and other ephemera, Holocaust, civil rights
- Collection size: 5,000+ artifacts and archival items
- Founder: Macy B. Hart
- Executive director: Kenneth Hoffman
- Chairperson: Jay Tanenbaum
- Curator: Michael Jacobs
- Website: www.msje.org

The Museum of the Southern Jewish Experience, or MSJE, is a private, non-profit museum in New Orleans, Louisiana. The museum explores the many ways that Jews in the American South influenced and were influenced by the distinct cultural heritage of their communities. Through exhibits, collections, and programs focused on the history of Southern Jews, the museum encourages new understanding and appreciation for identity, diversity, and acceptance.

The museum presents the history of Jews in thirteen states: Alabama, Arkansas, Florida, Georgia, Kentucky, Louisiana, Mississippi, North Carolina, Oklahoma, South Carolina, Tennessee, Texas, and Virginia.

The museum opened to the public on May 27, 2021. It is a member of the Council of American Jewish Museums, the Southern Jewish Historical Society, the American Alliance of Museums, and the Southern Museums Conference.

The museum's tagline is, "Shalom. Make yourself at home," which combines the Hebrew greeting with traditional Southern hospitality.

== History ==
The Museum of the Southern Jewish Experience in New Orleans traces its origins to 1986 when it opened at URJ Henry S. Jacobs Camp, a summer camp for Jewish children in Utica, Mississippi. The museum served as a clearinghouse and information center supporting the preservation of Jewish culture in the South, particularly in smaller towns, which were rapidly diminishing in size, as younger generations moved to larger urban areas. The Utica site closed in 2012.

In 2017 New Orleans was chosen as the home for the museum. It is located in New Orleans's Arts District, within blocks of the National WWII Museum, the Ogden Museum of Southern Art, the Contemporary Arts Center, and the Southern Food & Beverage Museum. The museum reopened in May 2021. The museum is housed in a renovated 1916 building, occupying its ground floor and half of the second floor.

== Exhibits ==
The MSJE's exhibits were designed in collaboration with Gallagher & Associates and are divided into four galleries. Galleries One and Three are chronological. Gallery One includes exhibits about colonial history, immigration waves, race relations, the Civil War, Southern Jewish peddlers and merchants, and various ways Southern Jews adapted to life in the South. Gallery Three includes exhibits about how Southern Jews reacted to the Holocaust, oral histories of Holocaust survivors who immigrated to the South, the Civil Rights movement, and the changing demographics of the Southern Jewish experience over time. Gallery Two contains a thematic exhibit exploring the foundational elements of the Jewish religion, including holidays, life cycle events, Jewish values and sacred texts. Gallery Four houses temporary exhibitions and special events.

The museum's audio-visual components were produced by Cortina Productions. They include a state-by-state exploration of the museum's collection and an interactive quilt-making table that allows visitors to design an electronic quilt square representing their identity. These squares are then “sewn” together with other squares, metaphorically representing the concept that everyone can contribute to their community's strength and diversity.

Since opening, the museum has received several awards for its exhibits, including Louisiana Endowment for the Humanities' Museum Exhibition of the Year Award, Southeastern Museums Conference's Gold Medal for Exhibition Design and Gold Medal for its Community Quilt installation, and USA Today's 10Best Readers Choice Award for New Attractions.

== Collections ==
The MSJE collection includes more than 5,000+ artifacts, including Judaica, household items, business records, photographs, letters, and other ephemera. Items on display include a Jewish soldier's Civil War diary, a steamer trunk used by a Jewish immigrant who entered the United States through Galveston, Texas, a wedding dress worn at a Jewish wedding in New Orleans in 1895, and the c. 1956 cash register from the original Stein Mart, in Greenville, Mississippi.

The Museum continues to collect artifacts from the thirteen states it represents.

== Programs ==
The museum offers a wide range of public programs, including lectures, panel discussions, film screenings, genealogy and artifact preservation workshops, musical performances, field trips, and specialized tours. Most programs are offered onsite and virtually.

== Research ==
The museum opened its Chapman Family Research Center in 2025. The Center includes the Ben May Reference Library & Reading Room, the Perlin Family Conservation & Digitization Studio, the Ivan M. Sherman, MD, Oral History Studio, and the Joanne B. Fried Archival Vault. With an emphasis on the interconnectedness between Jewish families across the South, the Center brings a distinctly Southern flavor to "Jewish Geography".

== Galleries ==
From the Collection:

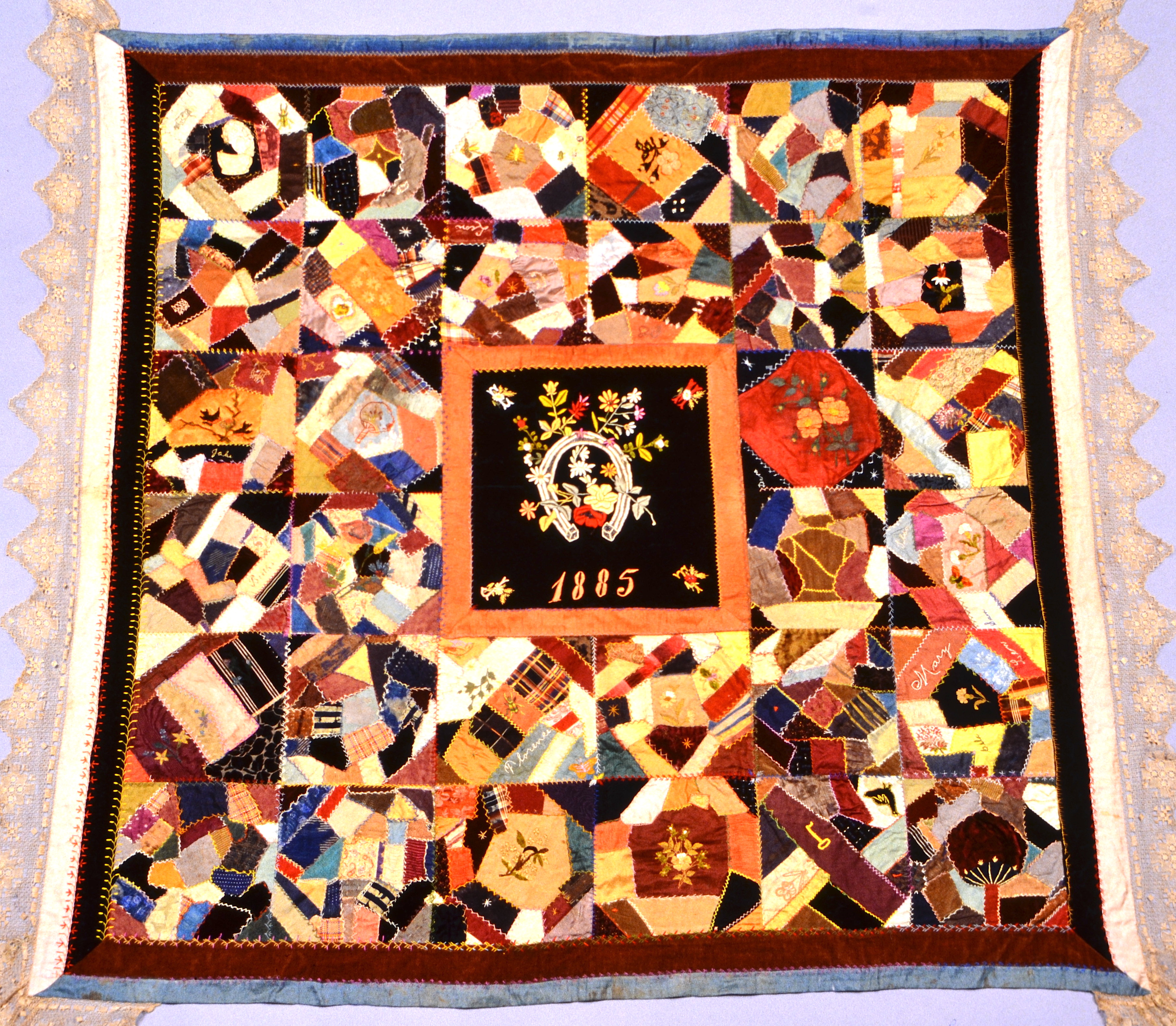
The Jewish Ladies Sewing Circle of Canton, Mississippi, made this quilt in 1885 to be raffled off in support of the synagogue.

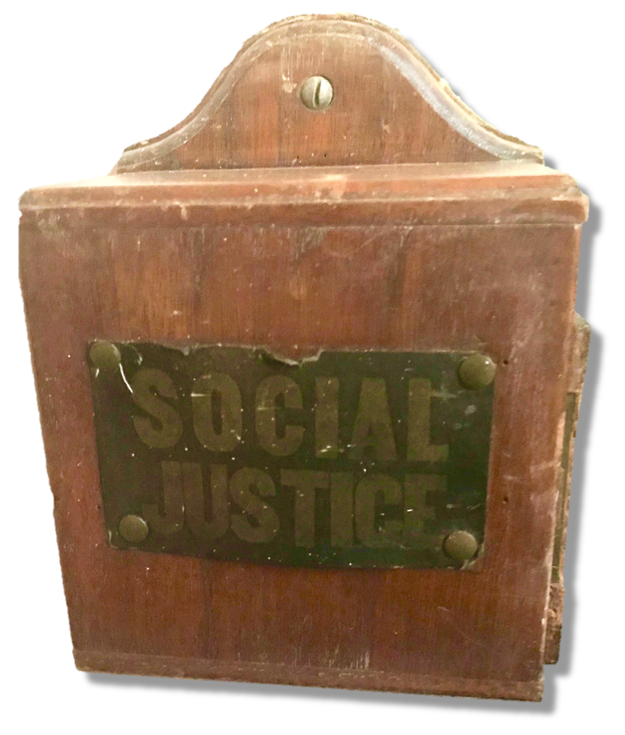
This tzedakah box hung for decades in Temple Sinai, in New Orleans, calling on congregants to support social justice causes.

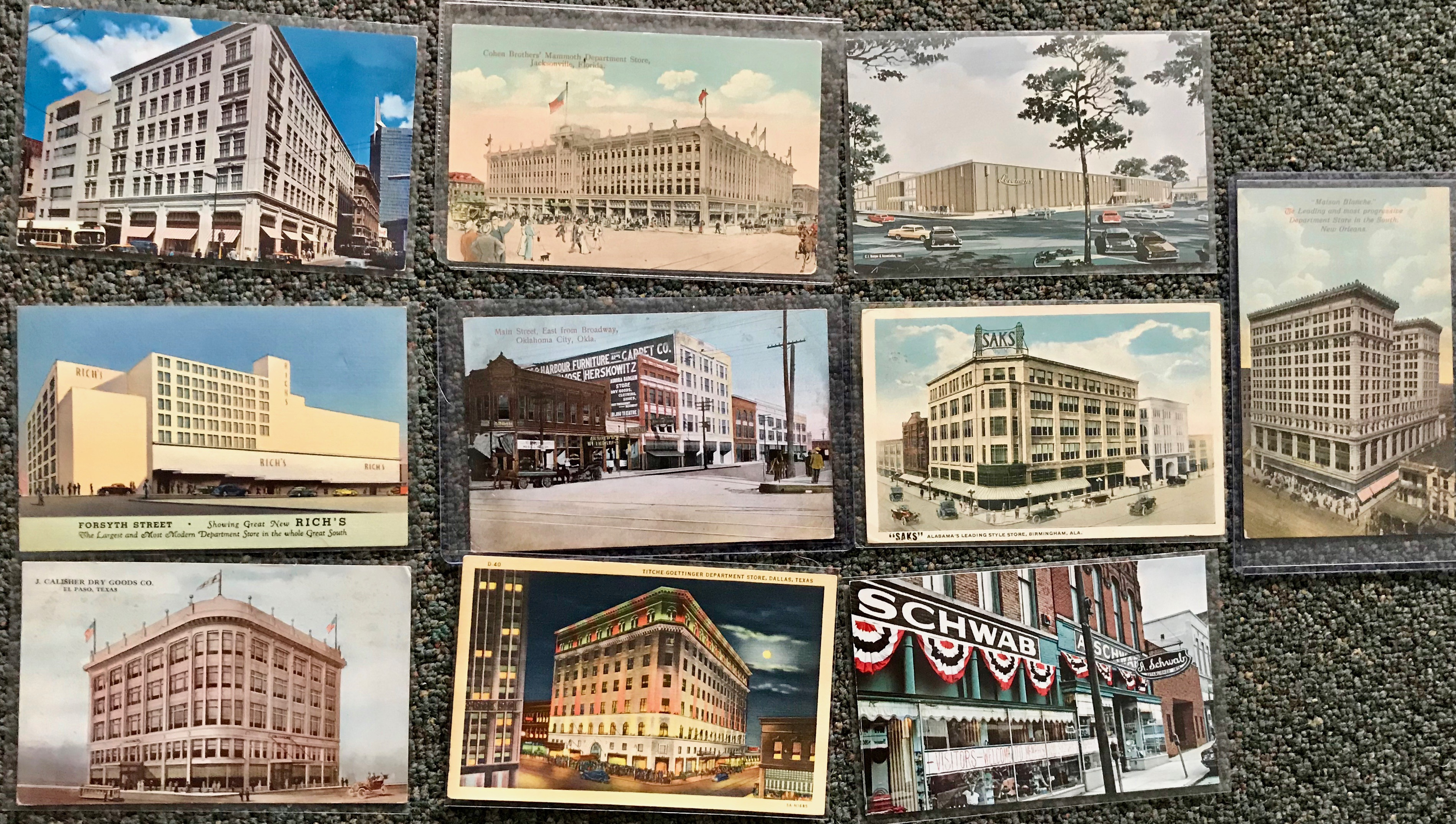
While many Southern Jews made a living in the 19th and early 20th centuries as merchants, a few rose to become owners of major department stores.

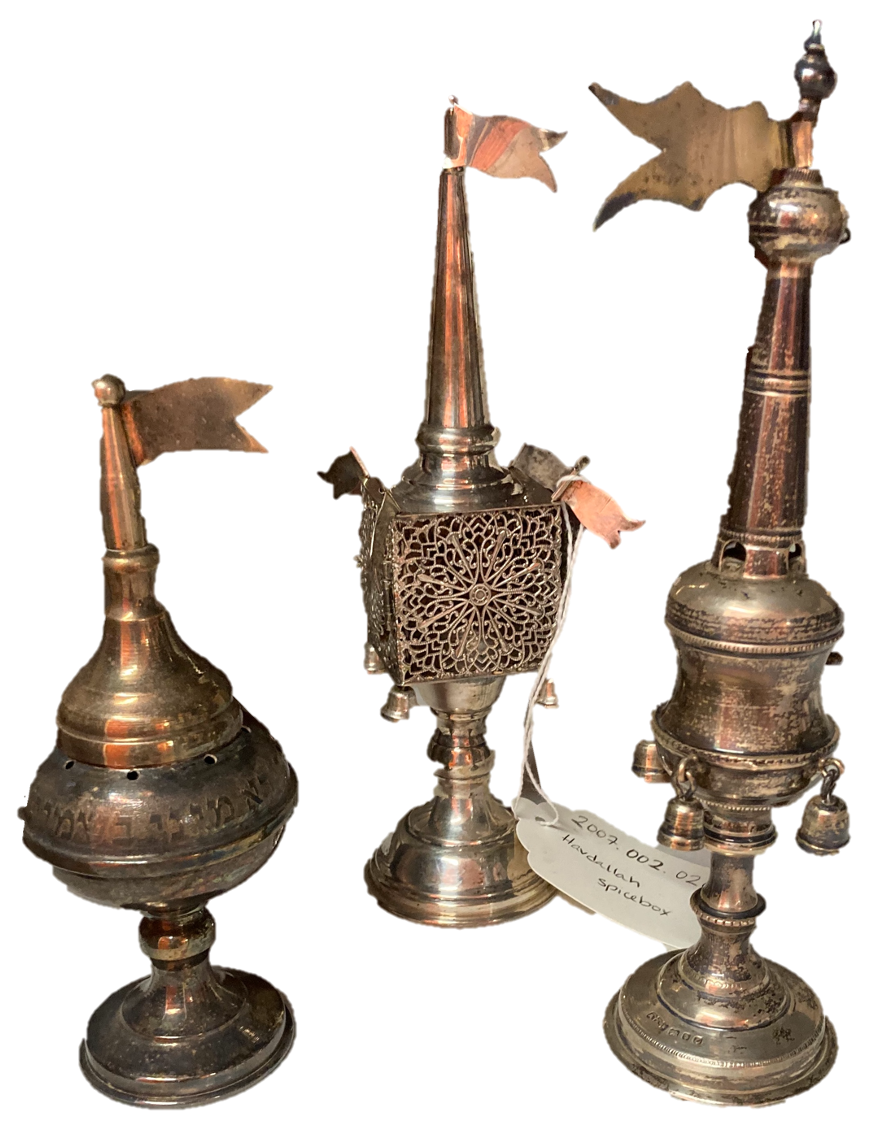
Spice boxes come from Helena, Arkansas that were used in Havdalah services, the ceremony observed at the end of Shabbat each week.

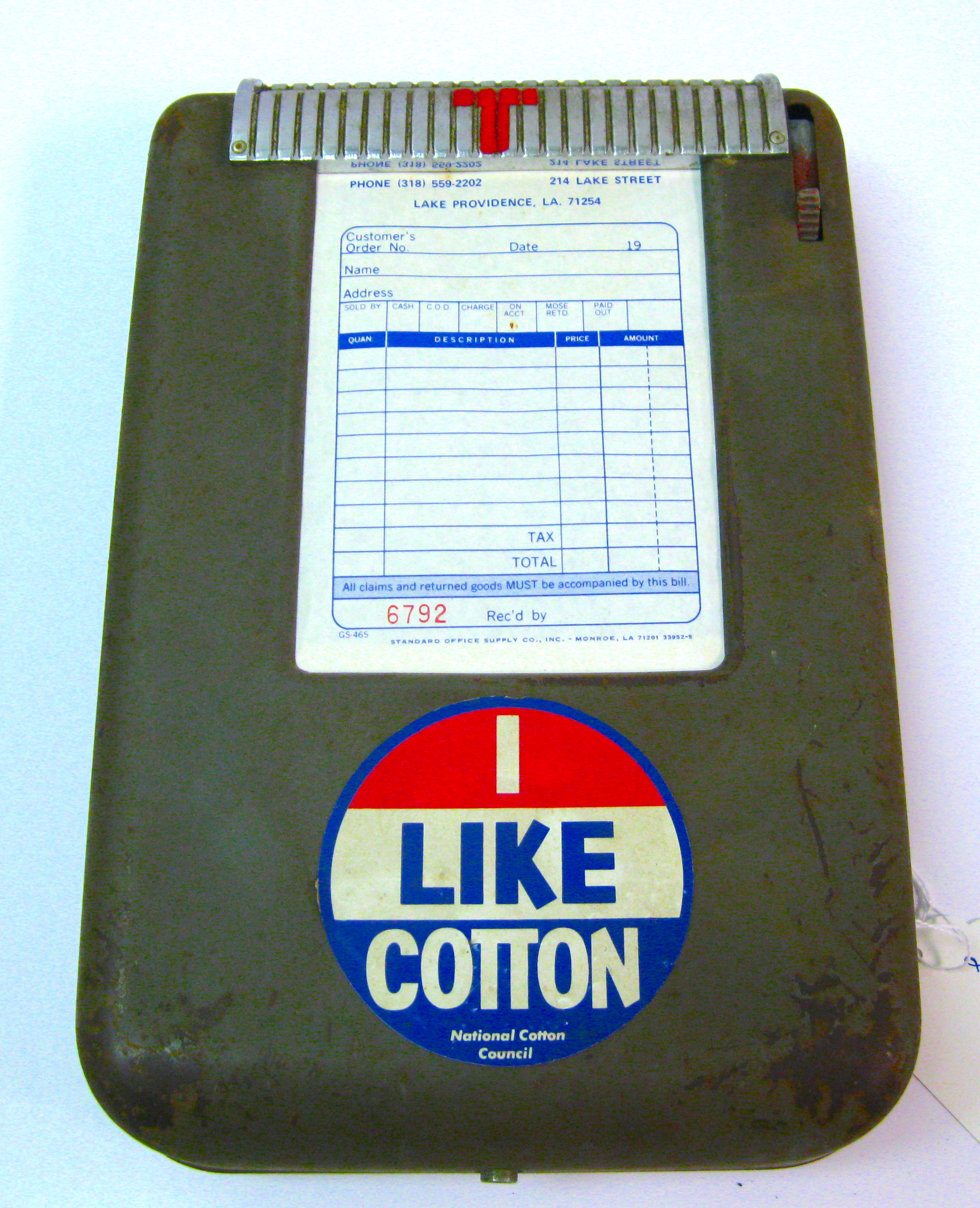
This receipt holder, with "I Like Cotton" sticker, comes from Galanty's, which was in business in Lake Providence, Louisiana, from 1896 to 1996. Many of Galanty's customers were cotton farmers.

From the Exhibits:

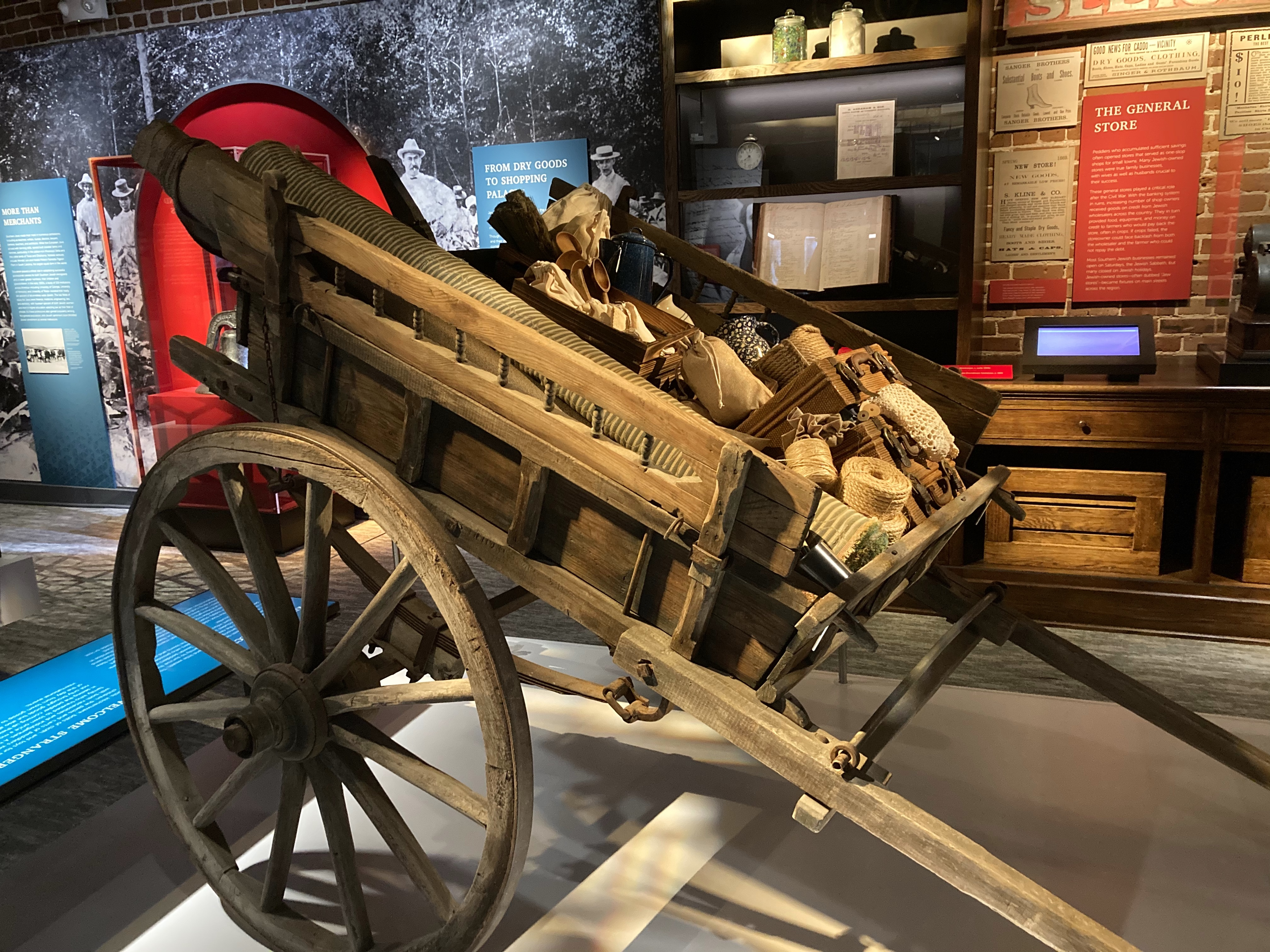
A peddler's cart

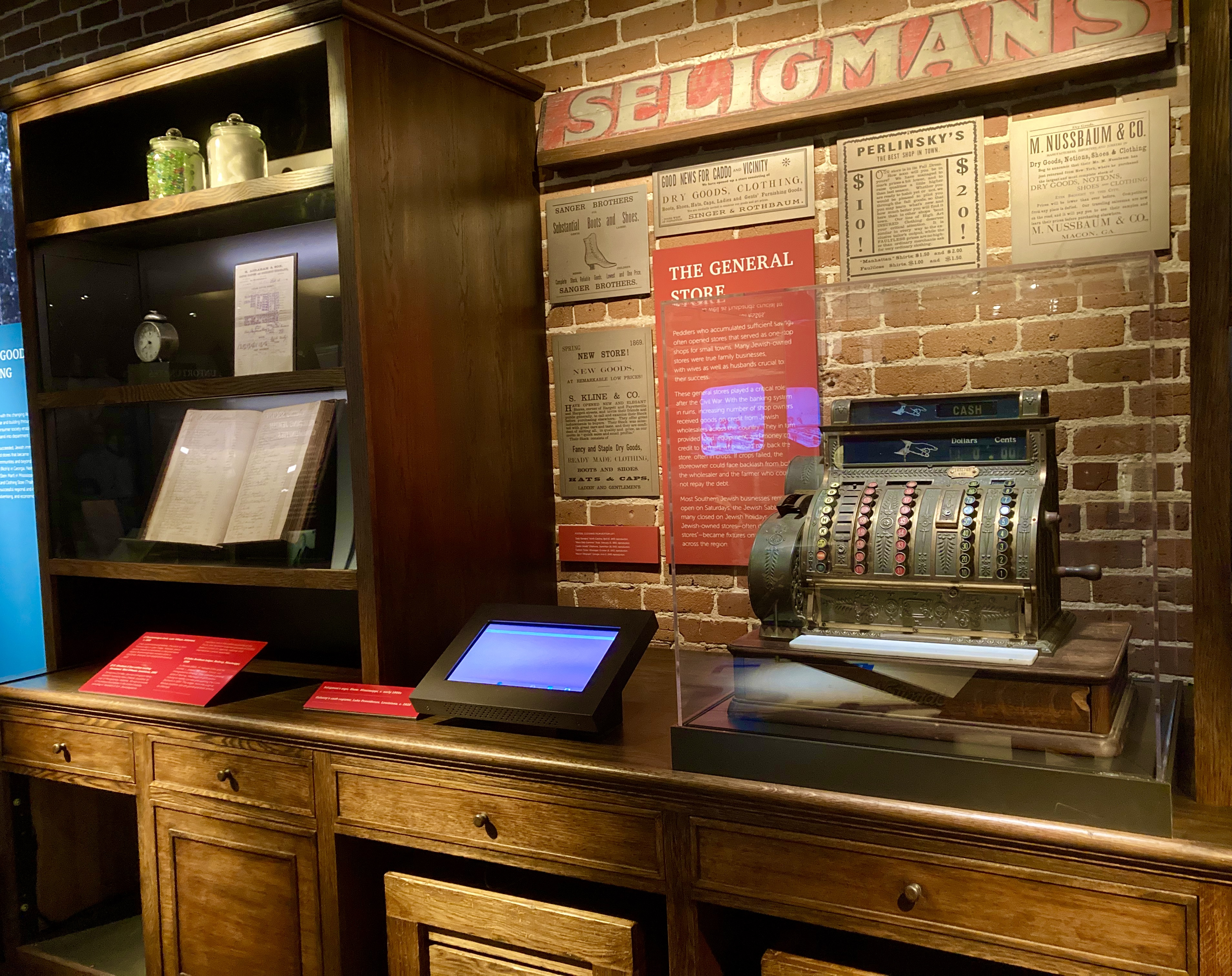
The general store

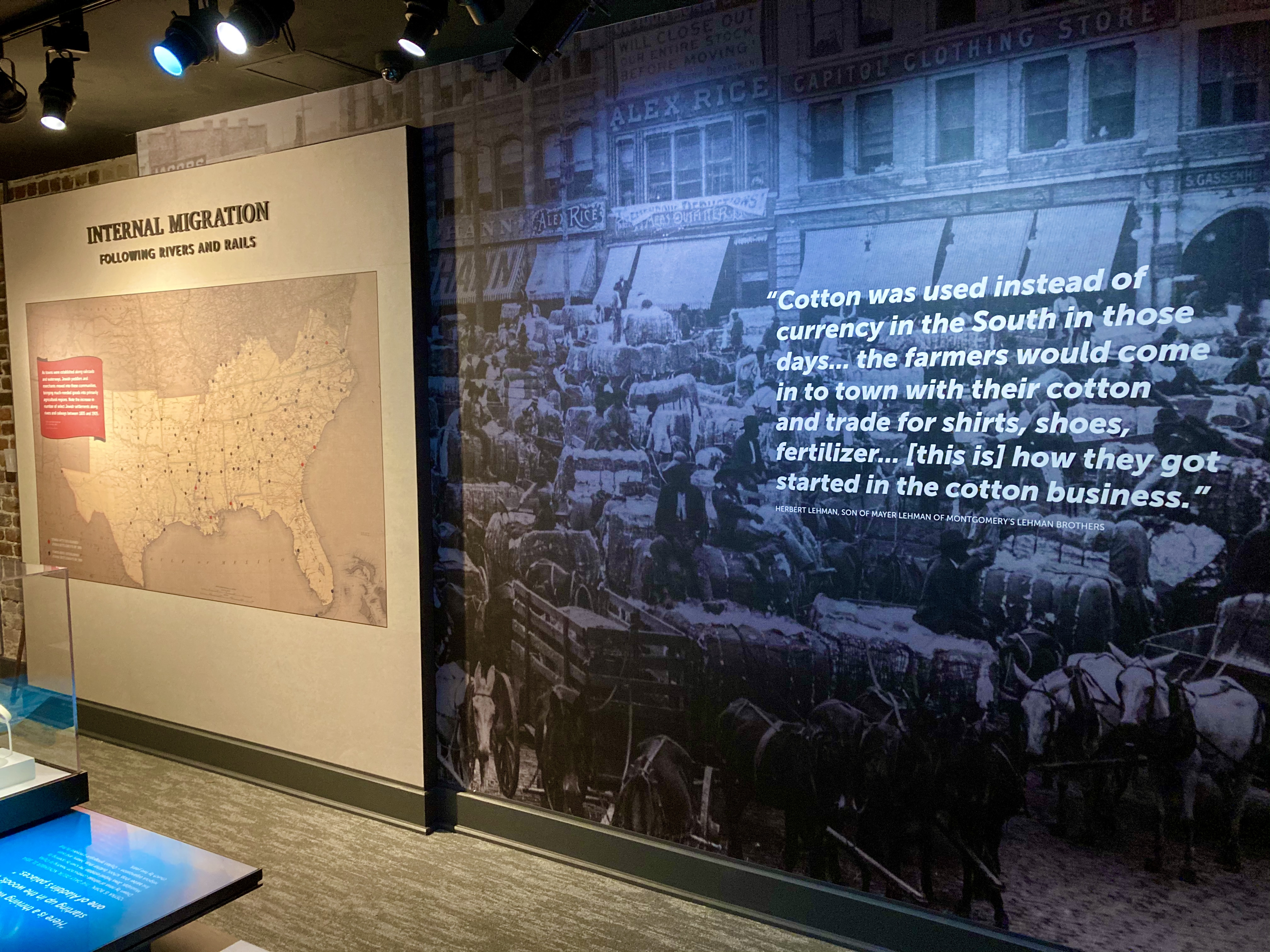
When Cotton Was King

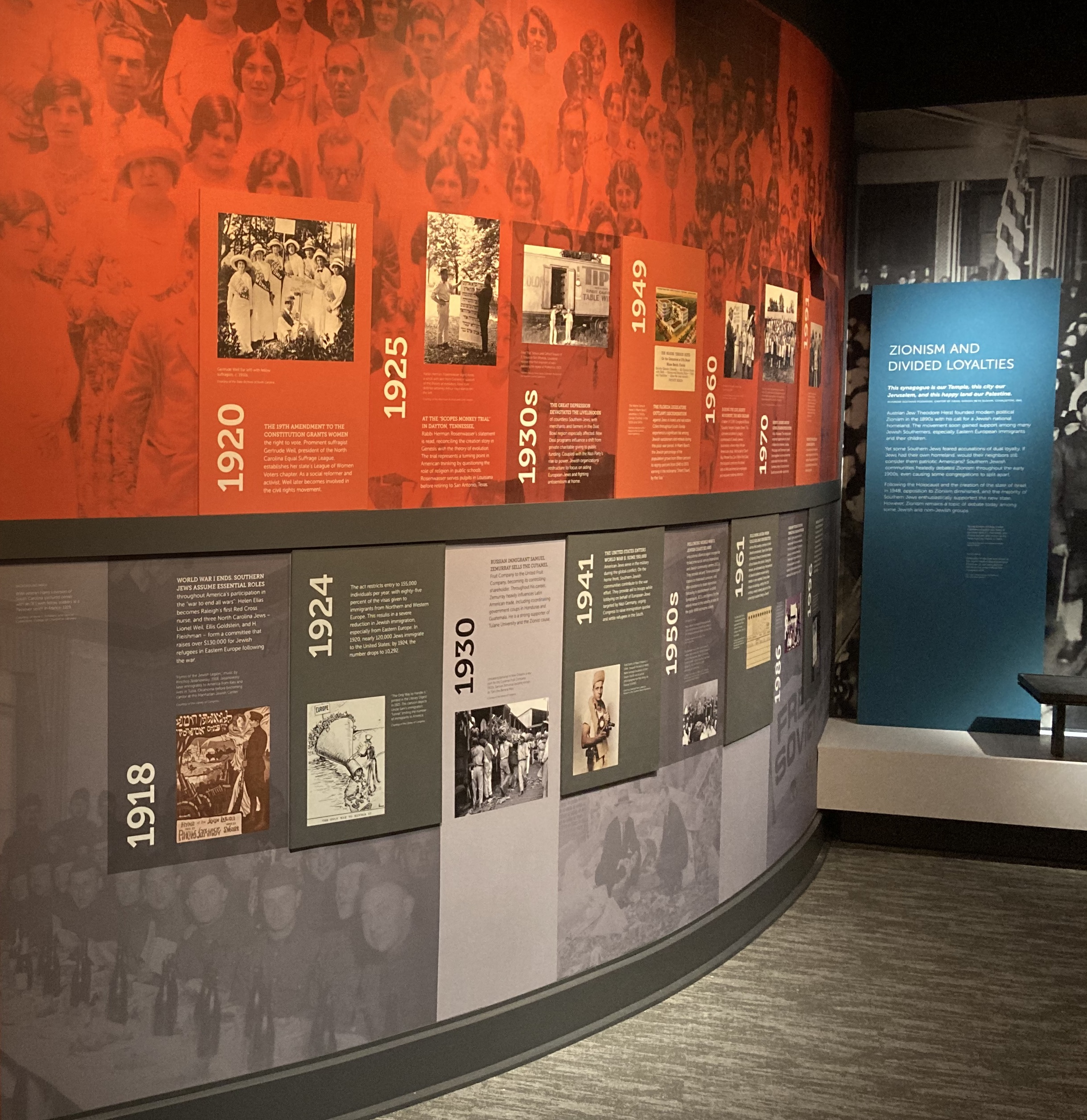
Entering a New Era

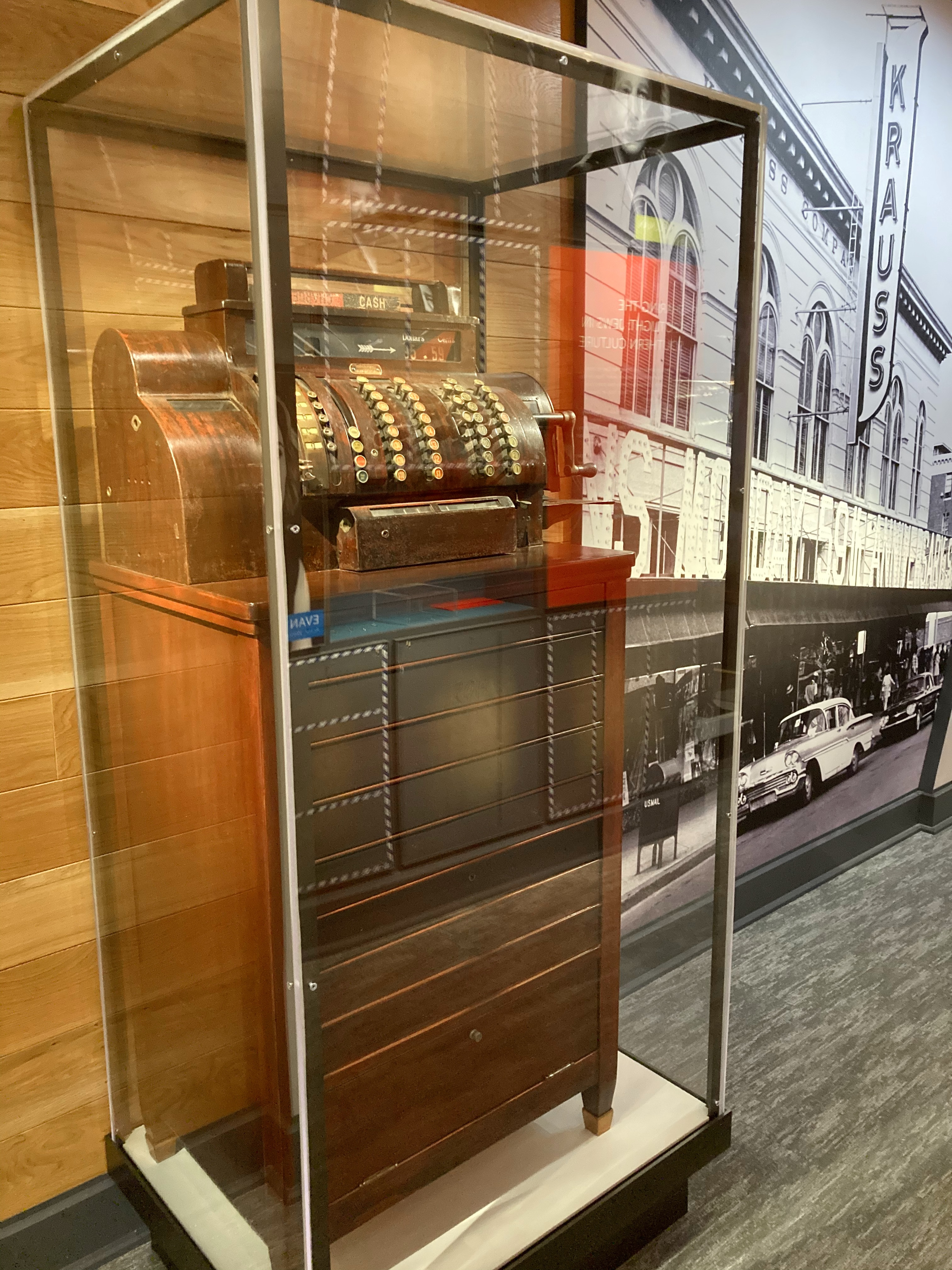
Cash register from the original Stein Mart, in Greenville, MS

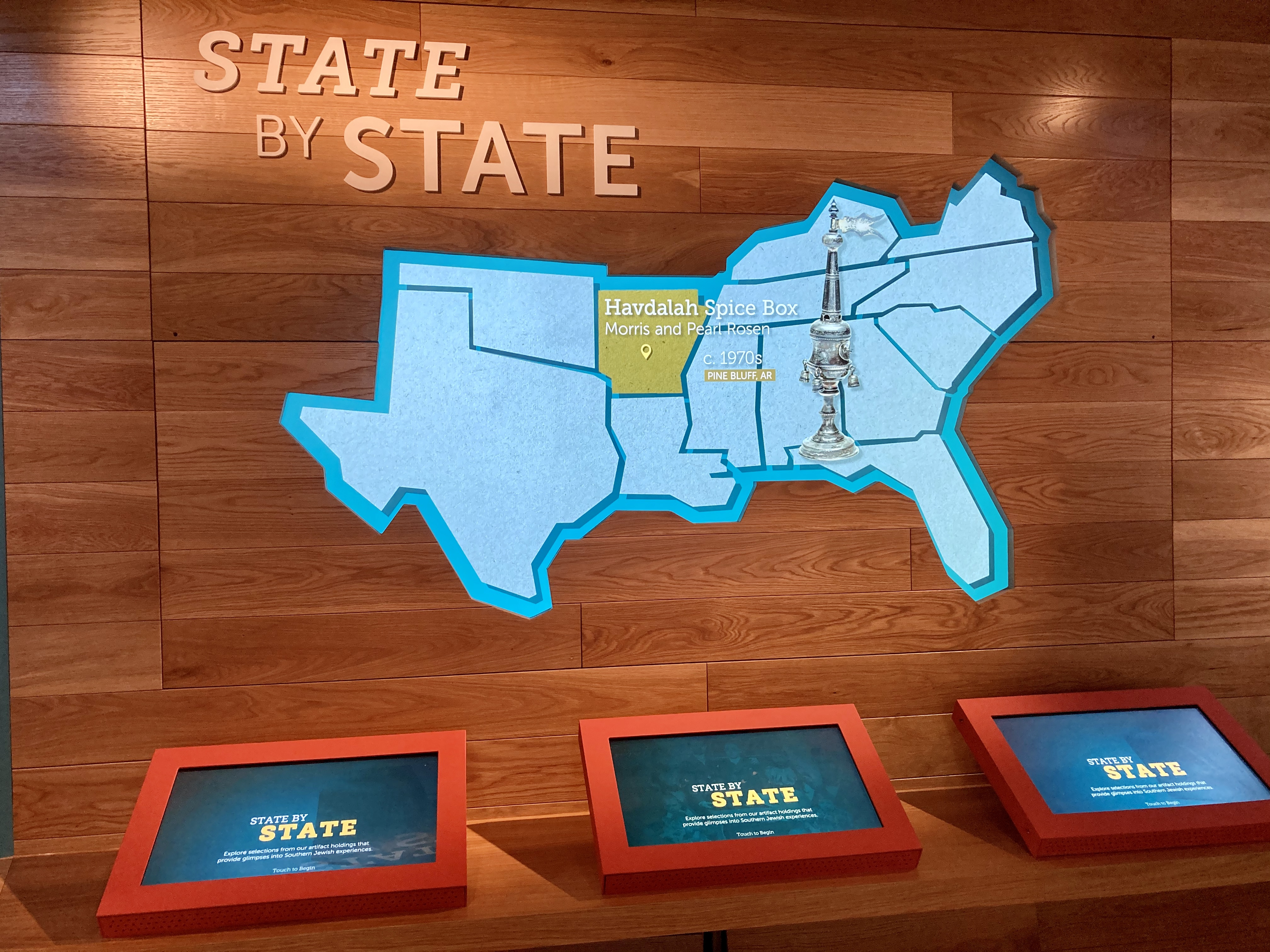
For a Deeper Dive

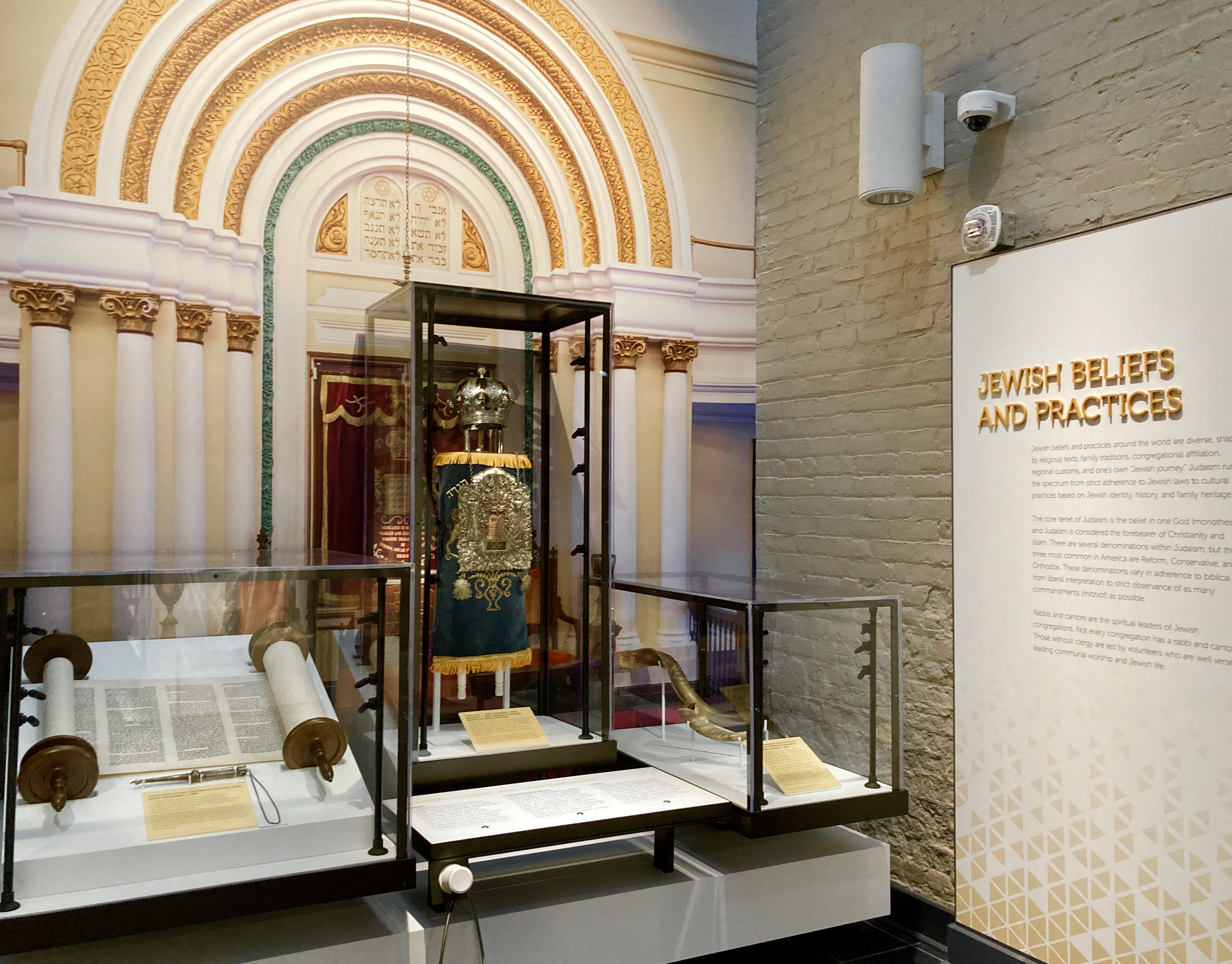
Foundations of Judaism

The Chapman Family Research Center:

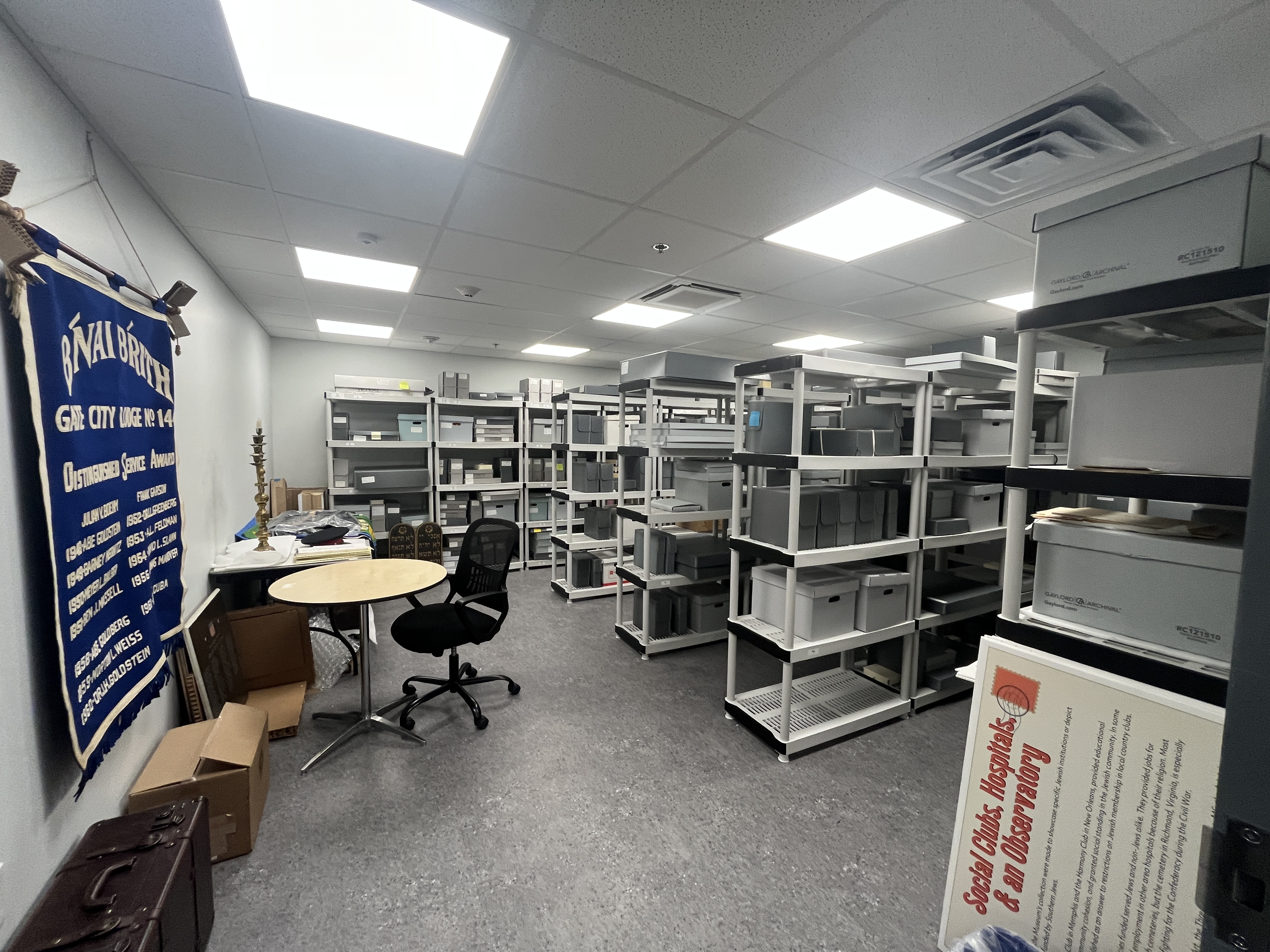
Archival vault

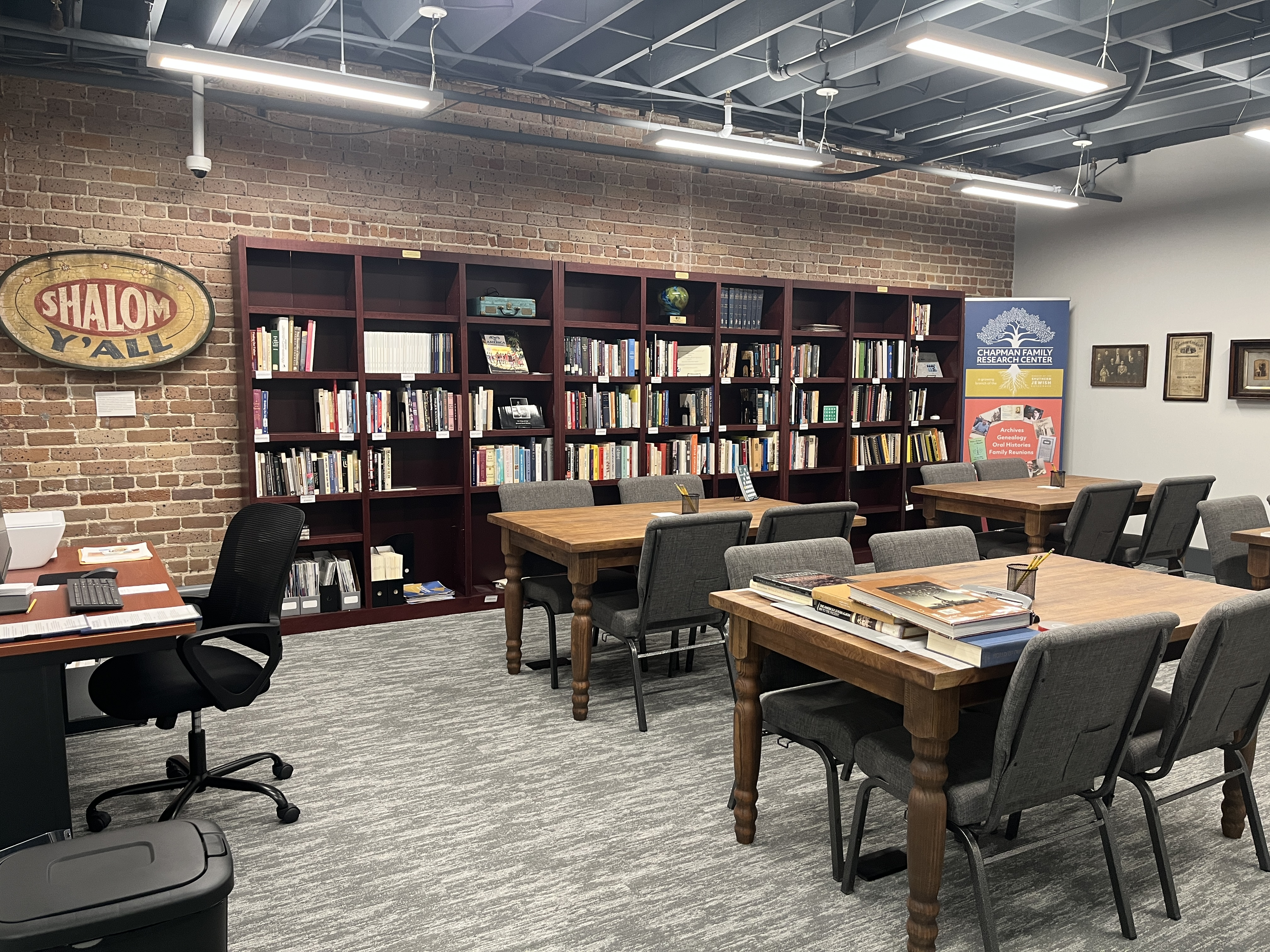
Reference library / reading room
