= Glenfield Plantation =

Historic house in Mississippi, United States

- Glencannon
- U.S. National Register of Historic Places
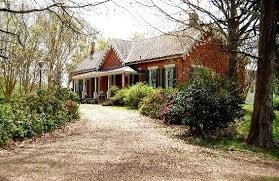
- Glenfield Plantation house

- Location within Mississippi Location within the United States
- Location: Jct. of Providence Rd. and Gov. Fleet Rd., Natchez, Mississippi
- Area: 148.2 acres (60.0 ha)
- Architectural style: Gothic Revival
- NRHP reference No.: 89002322
- Added to NRHP: February 8, 1990

Glenfield Plantation (originally called Glencannon) is a one-level historic antebellum home in Natchez, Mississippi. Glenfield was built in two distinct architectural periods on a British land grant originally deeded to Henry LeFluer by King George III. The original 500 acres grew to 2,000 acres working cotton plantation through various ownerships, circa 1774–1812, and 1845–1850.

Glenfield was listed on the National Register of Historic Places in Mississippi in 1990.

== History ==
Benjamin Monsanto and his wife Clare of the famous Sephardic Jewish slave trading Monsanto family purchased Glenfield Plantation in 1787. During his time, Monsanto had 17 enslaved people at the property, who were forced working the 500 acres (200 ha) of fields.

Glenfield was purchased in April 1880 by Osborne King Field, Sr. The descendants of Osborne King Field, Sr. and his third wife, Virginia Hamilton Field, still reside at Glenfield today as their private residence. Prior to 1880, Glenfield was called "Glencannon" by its previous owners, William and Jane Shipp Cannon.

Though Natchez, Mississippi, surrendered to Union troops, a skirmish during the Civil War was held here on the grounds of Glenfield (then Glencannon). A bullet hole in the front door and other preserved artifacts, including medals and buttons, have been recovered on the grounds in evidence of these facts. Union soldiers had pickets and an encampment on the grounds of Glencannon, as written in the diary of Lucy A. Cannon, the Cannons' 15-year-old daughter. The house has been a historic house museum with tours for the public since 1932 as well as a bed-and-breakfast since 1992.
