= History of the Jews in the Southern United States =

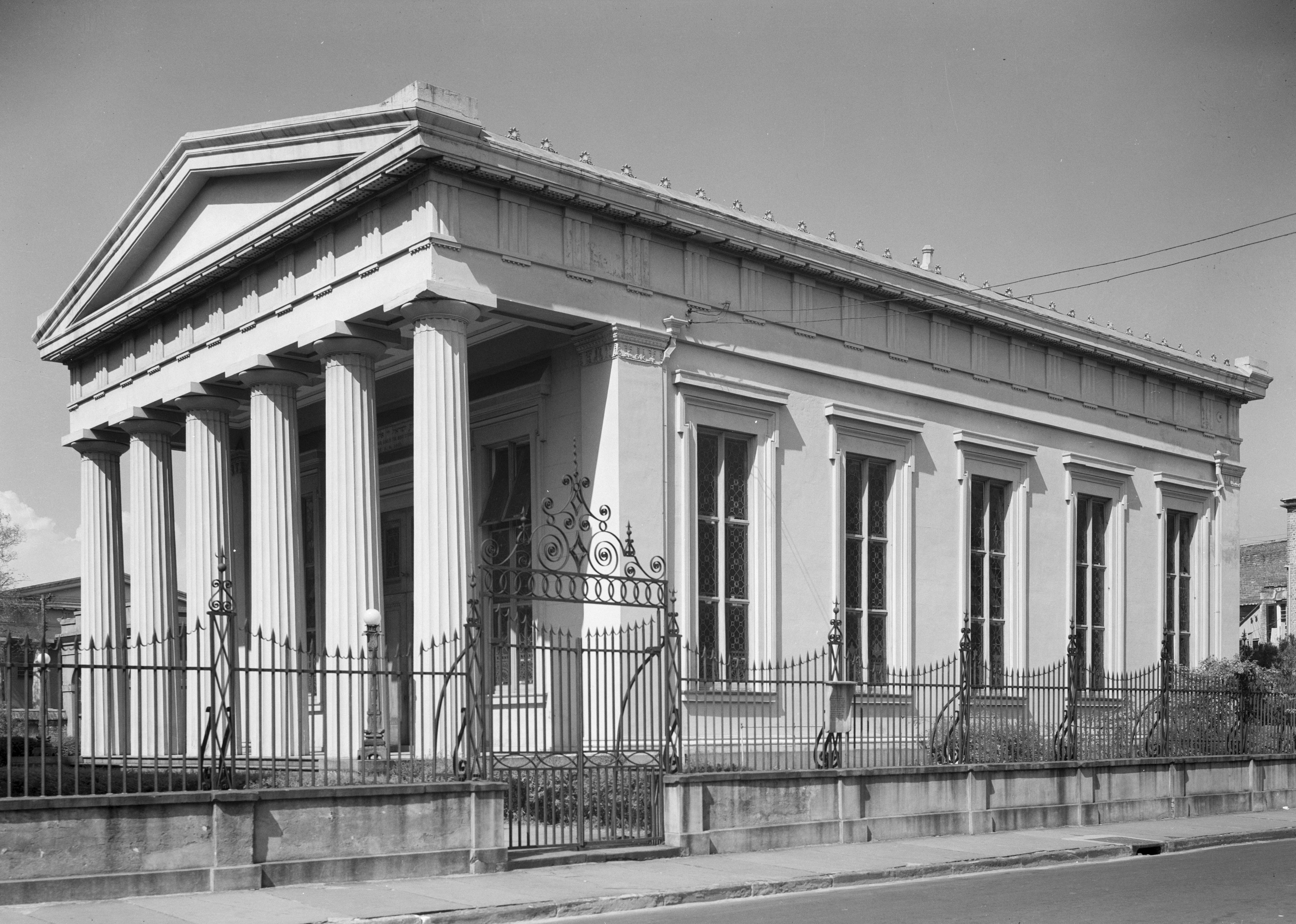
The Kahal Kadosh Beth Elohim Synagogue in Charleston, South Carolina was built in 1749 and remains one of the oldest synagogues still in use in the United States.

Jews have inhabited the Southern United States since the late 1600s when several waves of Western Sephardim and a minority of Ashkenazim settled in the European colonies of Britain, France, and Spain. The community has since contributed to the vibrant cultural and historical legacy of the South in many ways. Although the United States' Jewish population is more often thought to be concentrated in Northern cities, such as New York, thousands of Jewish immigrants chose to settle in the more rural Southern United States forming tight-knit religious communities and creating a unique cultural identity. Jewish immigrants came to the South from various countries, backgrounds and religious traditions within Judaism. Major Jewish communities include Memphis, Tennessee; Houston, Texas; Savannah, Georgia; Charleston, South Carolina; Charlottesville, Virginia; and Wilmington, North Carolina. Jews participated in many important events in Southern history, such as the Civil War, the World Wars, and the civil rights movement.

According to a 2020 national study of Jewish Americans, around 27% or 2,025,000 Jewish-Americans live in the Southern United States.

== History ==
Although a few Jews participated in European colonization efforts during the sixteenth and seventeenth centuries, the majority of Jews arrived in the 1700s, fleeing various European countries in order to avoid becoming victims of persecution and seek out economic opportunities in the colonies. The first major Jewish community in the South was formed in Charleston, South Carolina. By 1700, there was a small Jewish community in Charles Town, as the colony was then called. The Fundamental Constitutions of Carolina, the charter of the colony, guaranteed religious freedom and allowed Jews to own property. For years, up until the mid-1800s, the largest Jewish community on the North American continent was in Charleston, South Carolina.

The South is a geographic and cultural region of the United States made up of sixteen states.

== Peddlers and merchants ==
After 1830 many early German Jewish settlers were traveling peddlers, which facilitated greater mobility and enabled them to save up money and eventually start their own businesses. After 1865 many and perhaps most of the small town merchants in the South were Jewish. They enjoyed a degree of prosperity and tolerance, mainly because they were better able to integrate into the smaller Southern communities. . Instead, animosity was directed African Americans. Jewish merchants were on good terms with Black customers.

== Culture ==
Southern and Jewish culture have often intersected due to the rich and diverse immigrant background of Jews in the South. As with many immigrant groups throughout American history, feelings of identity differed depending on the region and on the extent to which immigrants assimilated to the surrounding culture. Studies have been done examining how Jewish and Southern identity intersect and sometimes come into conflict. While some identify as Southern Jews, putting their Southern and American identity first, others identify as Jewish Southerners, keeping their religion at the forefront of their identity.

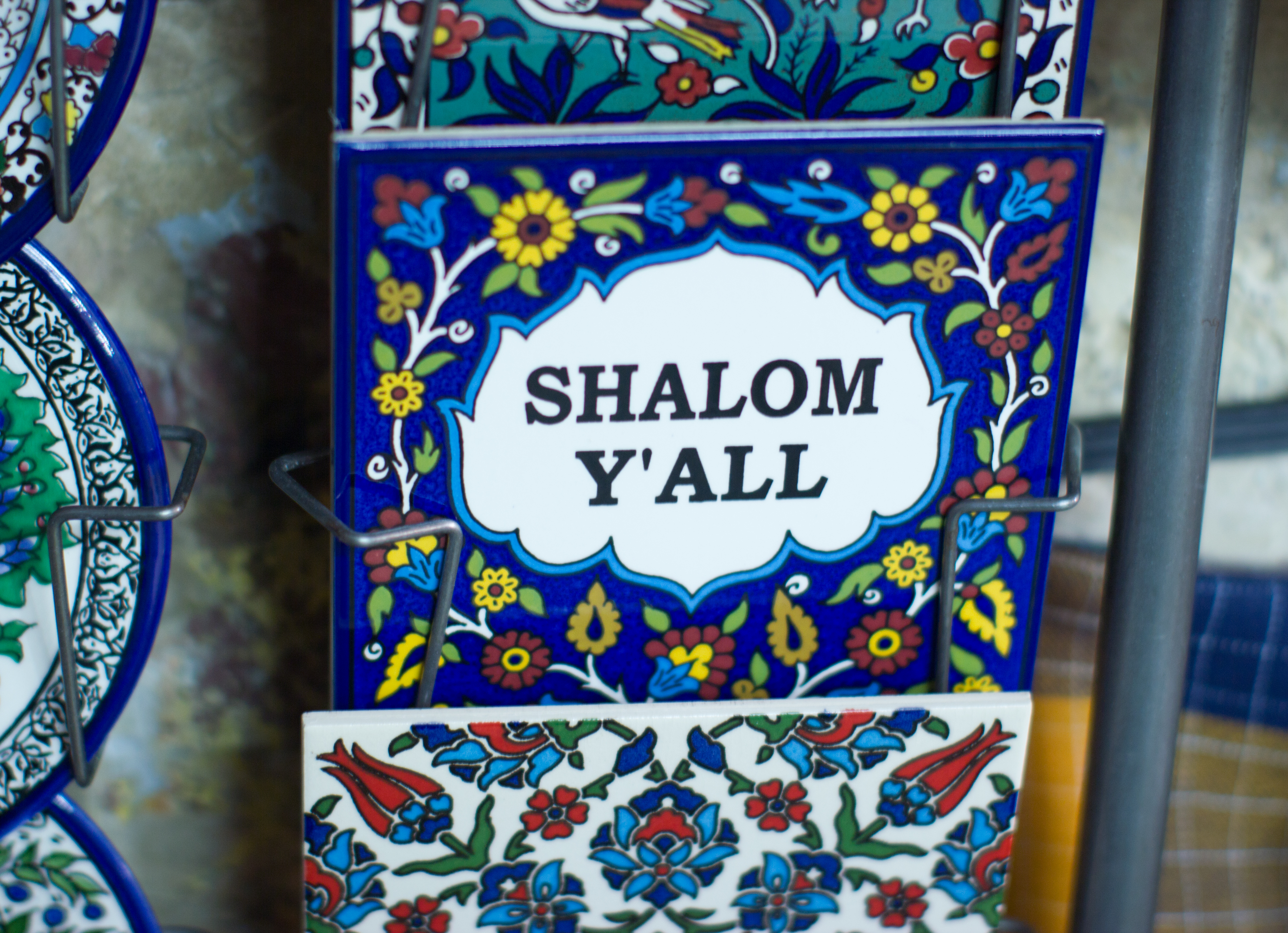
The fusion of Southern and Jewish culture can be seen in this unique phrase.

Due to the different "historical experiences and distinctive cultural patterns" that exist in the Southern United States, Southern Jews differ significantly from Jews living in the North. They experience a type of bicultural identity as a result of adopting many of the customs, practices, and values of Southern life. Southern accents influence Hebrew and Yiddish pronunciation and Southern cultural practices regarding gatherings and celebrations can be seen in Jewish events such as weddings, funerals, and Bar and Bat Mitzvahs. Additionally, Southern Jews make up a smaller proportion of their community's population than their Northern counterparts. They also enjoyed more affluence than Northern Jews, who often belonged to the poor, working class. Southern Jews on the other hand were mostly businessmen or professional workers; "Virtually no Jews had blue collar jobs." They came to the region because they knew it would be a place in which they could prosper economically.

Jews in the South were influenced by many aspects of Southern culture, including food and cuisine. Some early immigrants chose to follow strict kashrut dietary laws while others did not. Regardless, over time many Jewish families adapted their diets to the further assimilate to the Southern culture around them. Some examples of this mixing of cultures can be seen today in hybrid dishes such as matzoh ball gumbo or barbecued matzoh balls. Other culinary assimilation is seen in the Jewish practice of eating sweet potato pancakes and beignets to celebrate Hanukkah.

Southern Jews also differ from Northern Jews in the way they express their Jewishness. Because Northern Jews make up a significant portion of the population and don't assimilate as fully or as quickly as Southern Jews, they can express their Jewishness in an ethnic and cultural manner. Southern Jews on the other hand could be considered more religious Jews rather than cultural or ethnic Jews. This has to do with the fact that most Jewish immigrants who settled in the South came from Germany, where Jewish identity is tied only to religion, rather than Eastern Europe, where Judaism is seen as a cultural and ethnic identity in addition to a religion. "Southern Jews not only maintain and belong to synagogues more than Northern Jews, but they are more likely to attend services regularly."

== Communities ==
=== Georgia ===
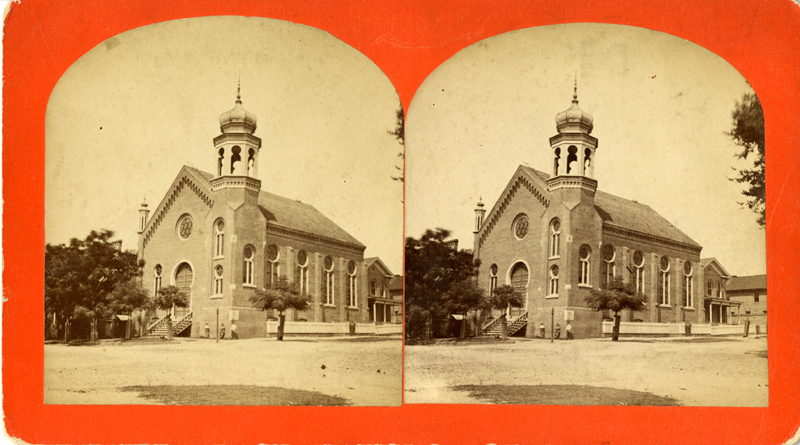
Beth Israel Synagogue, Macon, Georgia, c. 1876

Savannah, Georgia is home to the United States' third oldest Jewish community. On July 11, 1733, forty-two Jewish immigrants coming from London, England arrived in Georgia, drawn by the promise of religious freedom. Jewish immigrants later came from other European countries such as Spain, Portugal, and Germany. It wasn't until 1818 that the population grew large enough for a synagogue to be built. In the 1840s the population swelled once again as a big wave of Jewish immigrants came from Germany. Jews in Georgia were active members of society, participating in various clubs, social activities, and philanthropic institutions. They were also active in the political sphere, serving in local, state, and national offices.

=== North Carolina ===
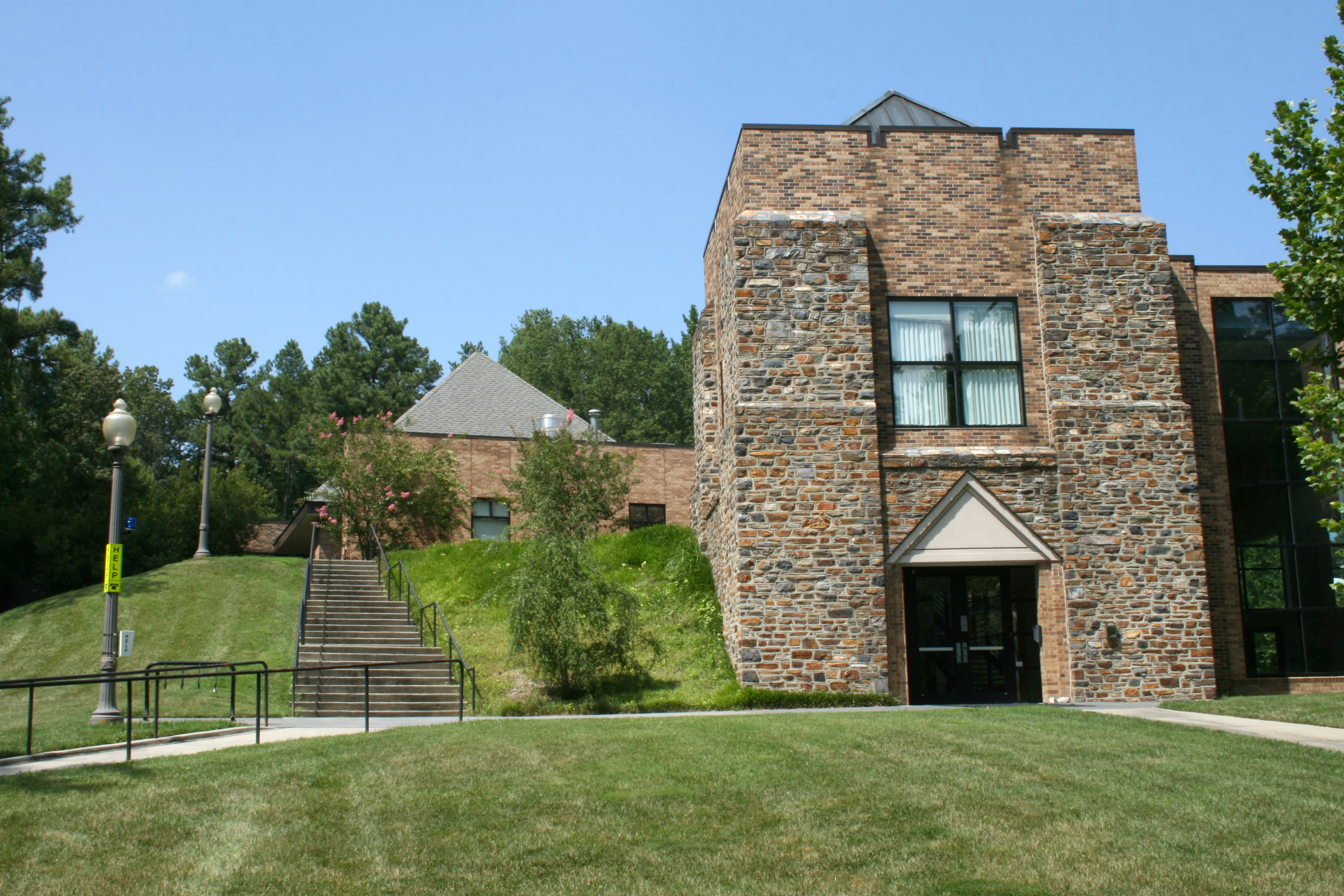
The Freeman Center for Jewish Life on Duke University campus was built in 1999 as a space for Jewish students and faculty.

The first Jew to arrive in North Carolina, Joachim Gans, came with Sir Walter Raleigh's second expedition to Roanoke Island (1585). He was the first Jewish settler in the British colonies, though his stay would not last long. He returned to England within a couple years, where he was taken to court because he refused to state that Jesus was the Messiah. The origins of Jewish community in North Carolina are small, and many of the families that first settled there either remained unmarried or converted and intermarried, keeping Jewish community number low. Many Jews were welcome because of their economic status, but they were also mistrusted. The first congregation was established in Wilmington in 1852. Between 1870 and 1910, the Jewish population in North Carolina skyrocketed. While anti-Semitism rose in the rest of the country following the Civil War, North Carolinian Jews did not seem to feel the same effects, and even seemed to be welcomed by the state. There were instances of Jews not being accepted and leaving, mostly for their unwillingness to integrate into southern practices and culture. Overwhelmingly, when Jews were willing to follow the basic cultural practices of their Christian neighbors, they were welcomed into the community and usually fared well both socially and economically. After the first World War anti-Semitism began to rise, but even with this rise, Jews in North Carolina faced less persecution than their counterparts in other states. During the years of the Great Depression, many Jewish youth attended college and left for Northern cities. The Jewish percentage of students at the University of North Carolina was more than twenty times the Jewish percentage of population of the state, and the university employed a few Jews as professors. UNC also became the first university in the South with a Jewish studies program. Many of the small towns in North Carolina saw local Jews as their friends and neighbors while still expressing anti-Semitism, especially against Jews in other parts of the country. The Holocaust and World War II, which North Carolinian Jews fought in with high numbers, reduced anti-Semitism across the country as they fought against that very idea in Europe.

=== South Carolina ===
The charter of the colony of South Carolina granted liberty of conscience to all settlers, expressly mentioning "Jews, heathens, and dissenters." As a result, Charleston, South Carolina has a particularly long history of Sephardic settlement, which, in 1816, numbered over 600—then the largest Jewish population of any city in the United States.

=== Virginia ===
The Jewish community in Charlottesville, Virginia began in the 1840s and 1850s, when Jewish merchants came for economic opportunities following the Napoleonic Wars. The majority of Jews that came to Virginia at this time settled in larger cities, but some settled in Charlottesville and began to participate in local affairs. Within a few decades, they built a synagogue and founded a religious community. One of the most significant contributions of the Charlottesville Jews was made by the Levy family. After Thomas Jefferson's death, they purchased Monticello and preserved it as a monument to Jefferson for almost 100 years. They attempted to give it to the United States government, who declined. There was a period of disrepair after it was seized by the Confederate government and used as a barn, but the Levy family purchased it again and restored it before eventually selling it to the Thomas Jefferson Memorial Foundation. Thomas Levy, the man who had bought Monticello the second time, had many other successful business ventures in Charlottesville, as did other Jewish people at this time. Despite their contribution, they and other Jews in Charlottesville were discriminated against for their religion and race. The government of Virginia forced them to move their synagogue in favor of a post office, even though there were large unused tracts of land available throughout the city. In 1921, the Ku Klux Klan warned that only 100 percent Americans, that is to say white Christian Americans, were welcome in Charlottesville, and faculty from the University of Virginia supported anti-Semitism from a eugenics standpoint, claiming that Jewish people were genetically inferior to non-Jewish whites. Jews were targeted during the civil rights movement, and Charlottesville became the center of the divide as schools were desegregated.

== Participation in major events ==
=== The Civil War ===
Many Southern Jewish men fought for the Confederacy during the Civil War; Jewish women also donated and helped with the war effort. Many chose to fight because of the economic opportunities the war presented, as well as the war fever that took hold. In addition, many immigrants from Europe appreciated the freedom and tolerance they enjoyed in the United States, and wanted to show that they were contributing members of society. Other Jewish men chose not to fight, such as Alfred Mordecai, a North Carolinian who was the first Jewish graduate of West Point. Mordecai refused to participate in the war because he did not want to fight against his family in the South. Historians have often portrayed Jewish participation in the Civil War as zealous, eager, loyal, and for the most part unanimous; however, recent scholarship has revealed that such enthusiasm and loyalty to the Confederate cause was not so widespread. Many Jews managed to avoid conscription by temporarily or permanently leaving the South while others only chose to enlist in limited positions where they could remain close to home.

In response to antisemitic statements made by prominent abolitionists such as William Lloyd Garrison and Edmund Quincy, American rabbis in both the North and South generally adopted an anti-abolitionist stance. Jayme A Sokolow writes that "with one exception all the Jewish abolitionists were Reform Jewish emigres."

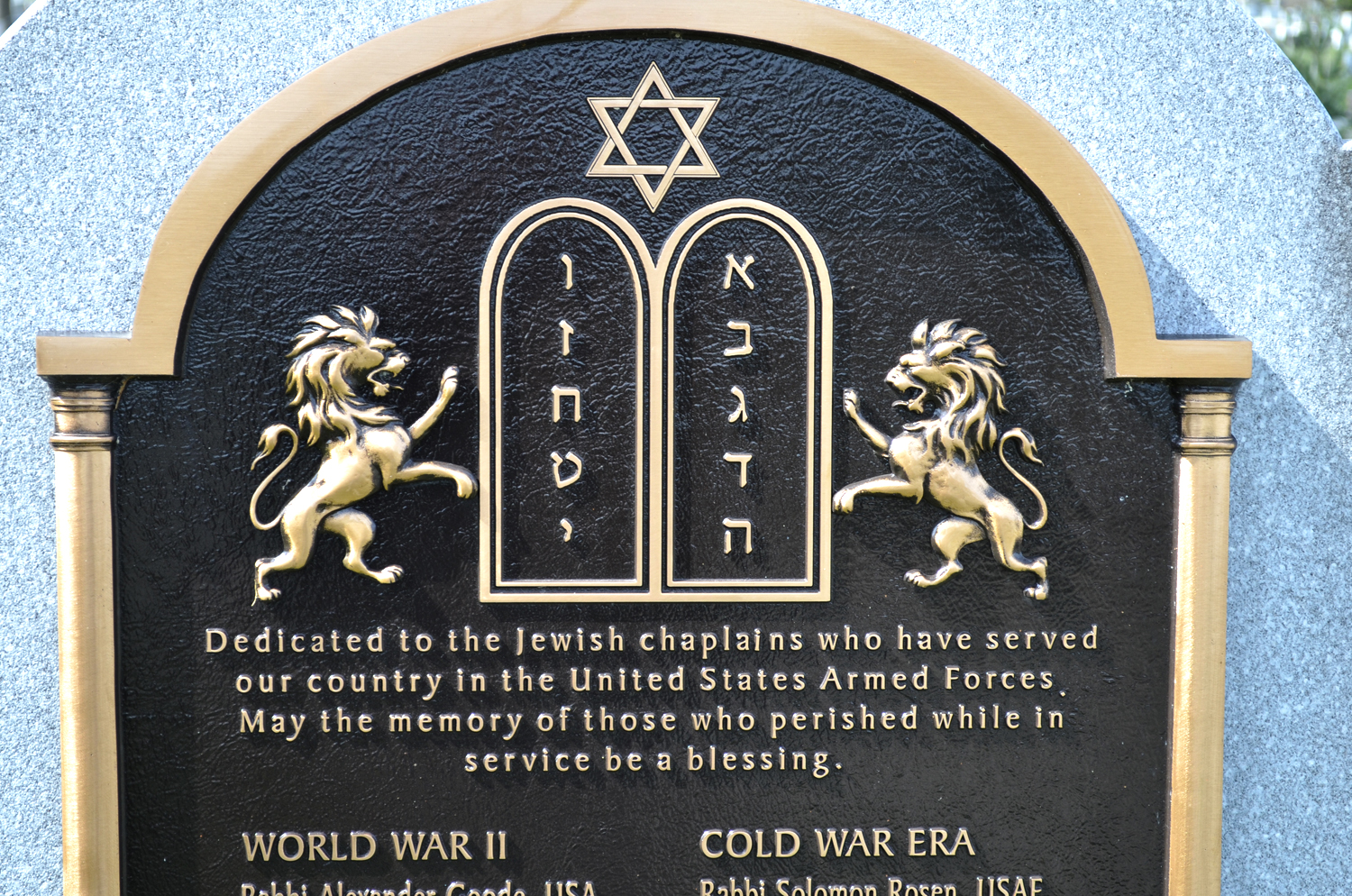
A memorial plaque at Arlington National Cemetery commemorates the service of 14 Jewish Chaplains who have died while serving in World War II, Korea, and Vietnam Wars.

=== World wars ===
As during the Civil War, many Southern Jewish men signed up to fight in both of the world wars. They also began sending some of their young women, who were being accepted into military service. Many rabbis became military chaplains, and Jewish communities as a whole contributed to the war effort. They also responded charitably by contributing to and organizing various fundraisers to help those who were affected by World War I in Europe. The Second World War, with Adolf Hitler's attack on the Jews in Europe, alarmed Jewish people worldwide, and the American South was no different. Jewish communities in Alabama worked alongside national organizations to resettle refugees fleeing Europe both during and after the war.

=== Civil rights movement ===
While many notable Northern Jews participated in the civil rights movement, the Jewish involvement in the South was much more limited. While some Southern Jews may have been sympathetic towards the sufferings of African Americans and their fight for equality, the desegregation crisis caused a spike in antisemitism, reinforcing the idea that Jews already had that keeping the racial status quo would be to their benefit.

However, there were a few Jewish actors who joined the movement despite great personal risks. Sixteen rabbis in St. Augustine, Florida joined with the Southern Christian Leadership Conference to fight segregation, facing violence and arrest alongside African American protesters. Rabbi Jacob Rothschild from Atlanta, Georgia was a good friend of Martin Luther King Jr. and fought alongside him in the civil rights movement. Two Jews, Michael Schwerner and Andrew Goodman, were killed in Mississippi while trying to help African Americans register to vote during the Freedom Summer. Those who publicly supported the movement were often shunned by other members of their community. A rabbi who showed his support for the Scottsboro boys by attending a rally in Alabama was forced to resign from his synagogue. While African American leaders acknowledged these efforts and sacrifices on the part of Southern Jews, they also expressed deep disappointment in the majority of the South's Jews because of their failure to speak up and participate in the movement on a widespread scale.

== Gallery ==
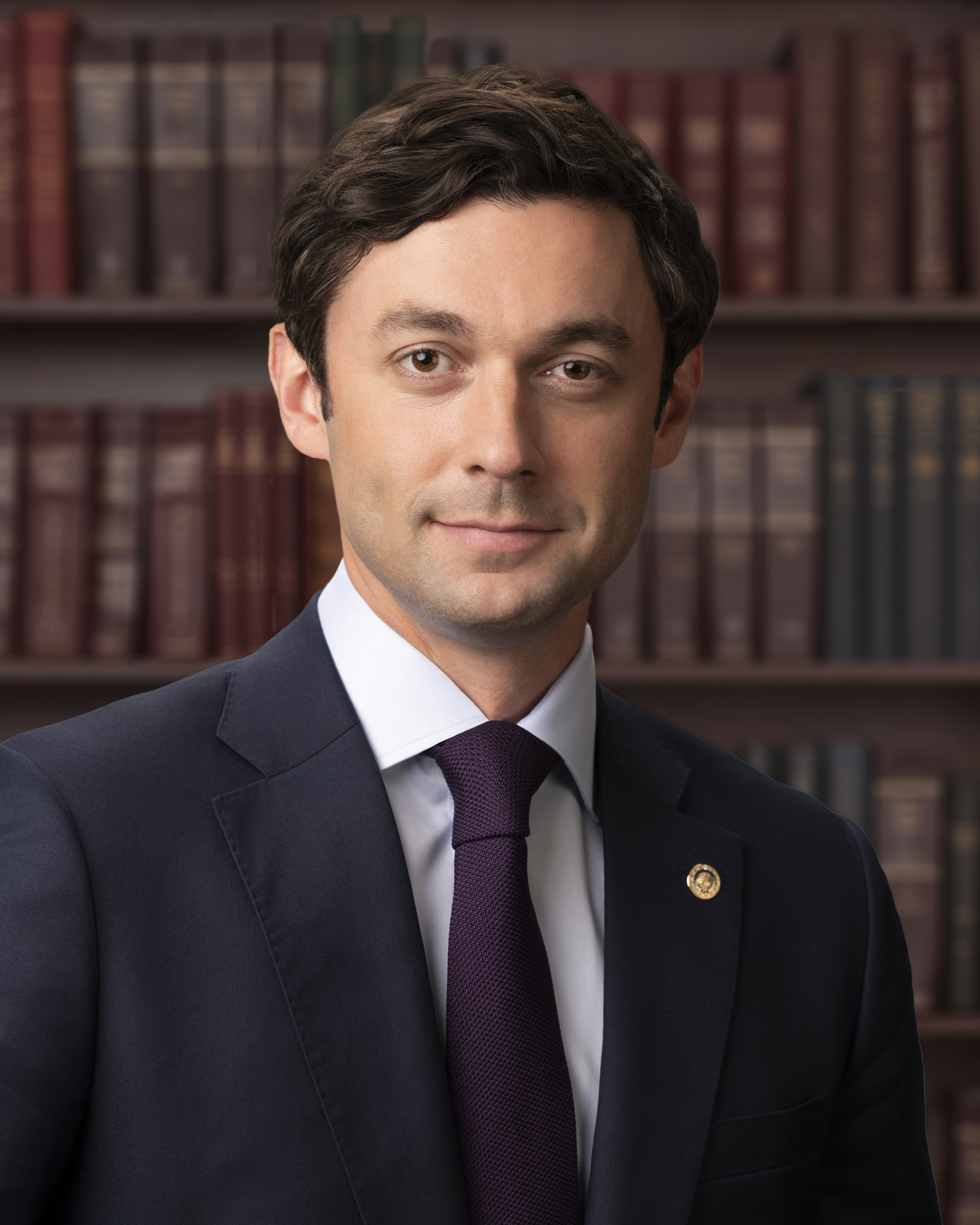
Jon Ossoff – senator from Georgia since 2021

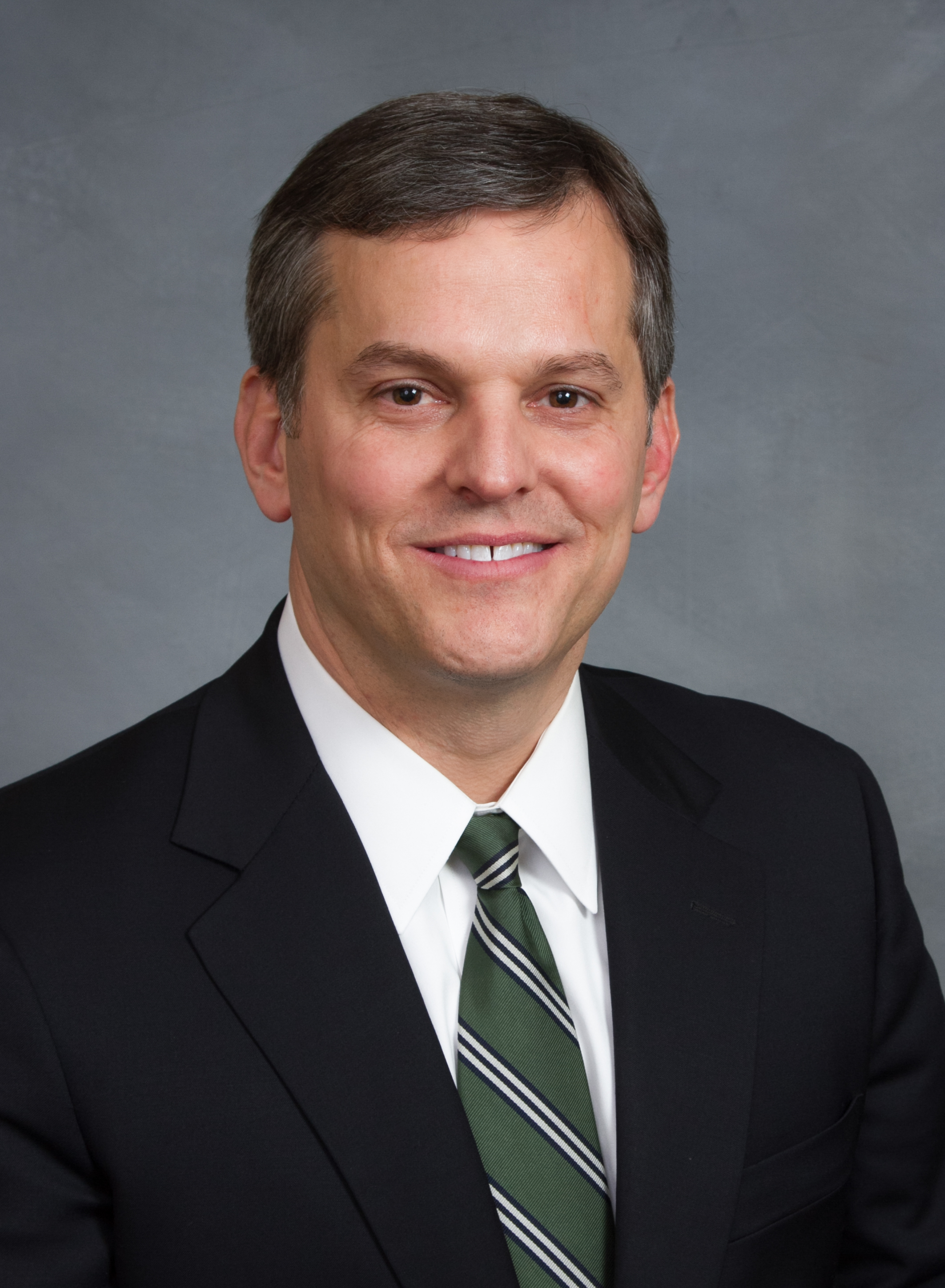
Josh Stein – governor of North Carolina since 2025

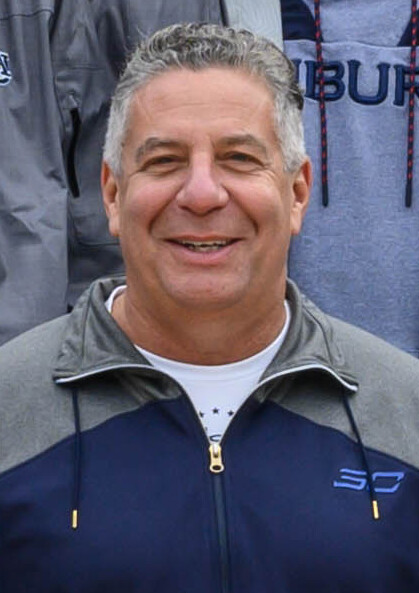
Bruce Pearl – legendary Auburn Tigers men's basketball coach

== See also ==
- History of the Jews in Charleston, South Carolina
- History of the Jews in South Florida
- Temple Israel (Memphis, Tennessee)
- Henry S. Jacobs Camp
- Spanish-Portuguese Jews in the United States

== Sources ==
- Ferris, Marcie Cohen; Greenberg, Mark I. (2006). Jewish Roots in Southern Soil: A New History. UPNE. ISBN 978-1-58465-589-3.
- Rogoff, Leonard (2001). Homelands: southern Jewish identity in Durham and Chapel Hill, North Carolina. University of Alabama Press. ISBN 978-0-8173-1356-2. OCLC 605394371.
- Smith, William L., and Pidi Zhang. “Southern Jews and Jewish Southerners in Savannah, Georgia," Michigan Sociological Review, vol. 33, 2019, pp. 46–75. online
- Stollman, Jennifer A (2013). Daughters of Israel, daughters of the south: southern Jewish women and identity in the antebellum and Civil War South. Academic Studies Press. ISBN 978-1-61811-207-1. OCLC 849946355.
- Weissbach, Lee Shai (2005). Jewish Life in Small-Town America: A History. Yale University Press. ISBN 978-0-300-10671-8. JSTOR j.ctt1npdcf. OCLC 123125257.
