= Fort Worth, Texas =

City in Texas, United States

Fort Worth
- City
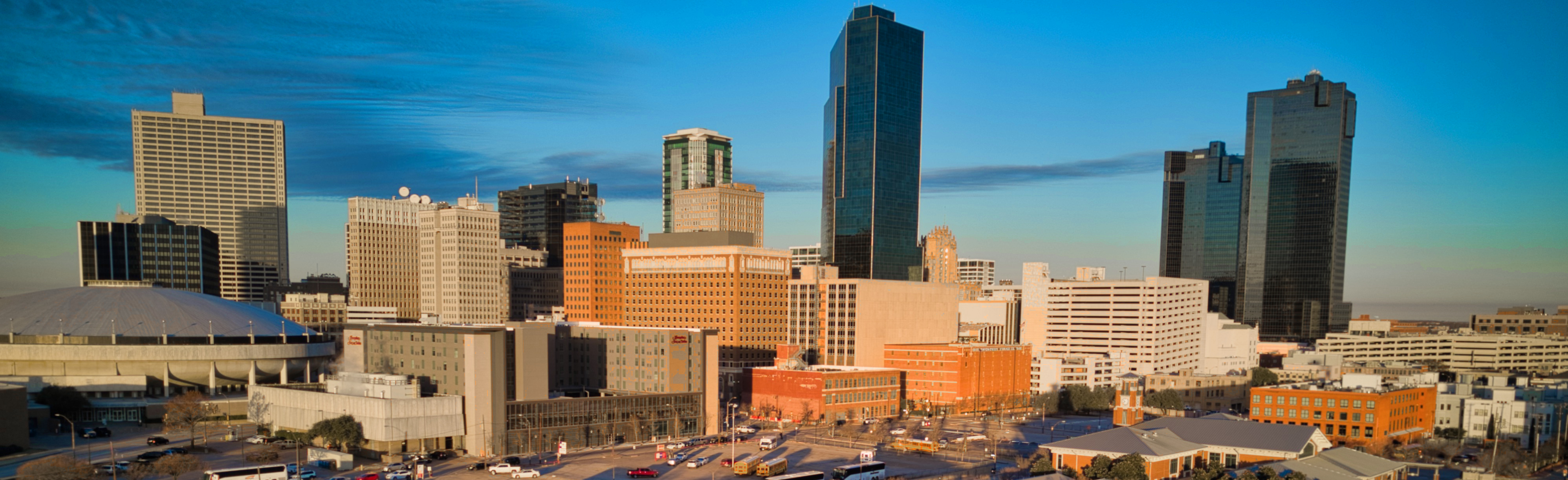
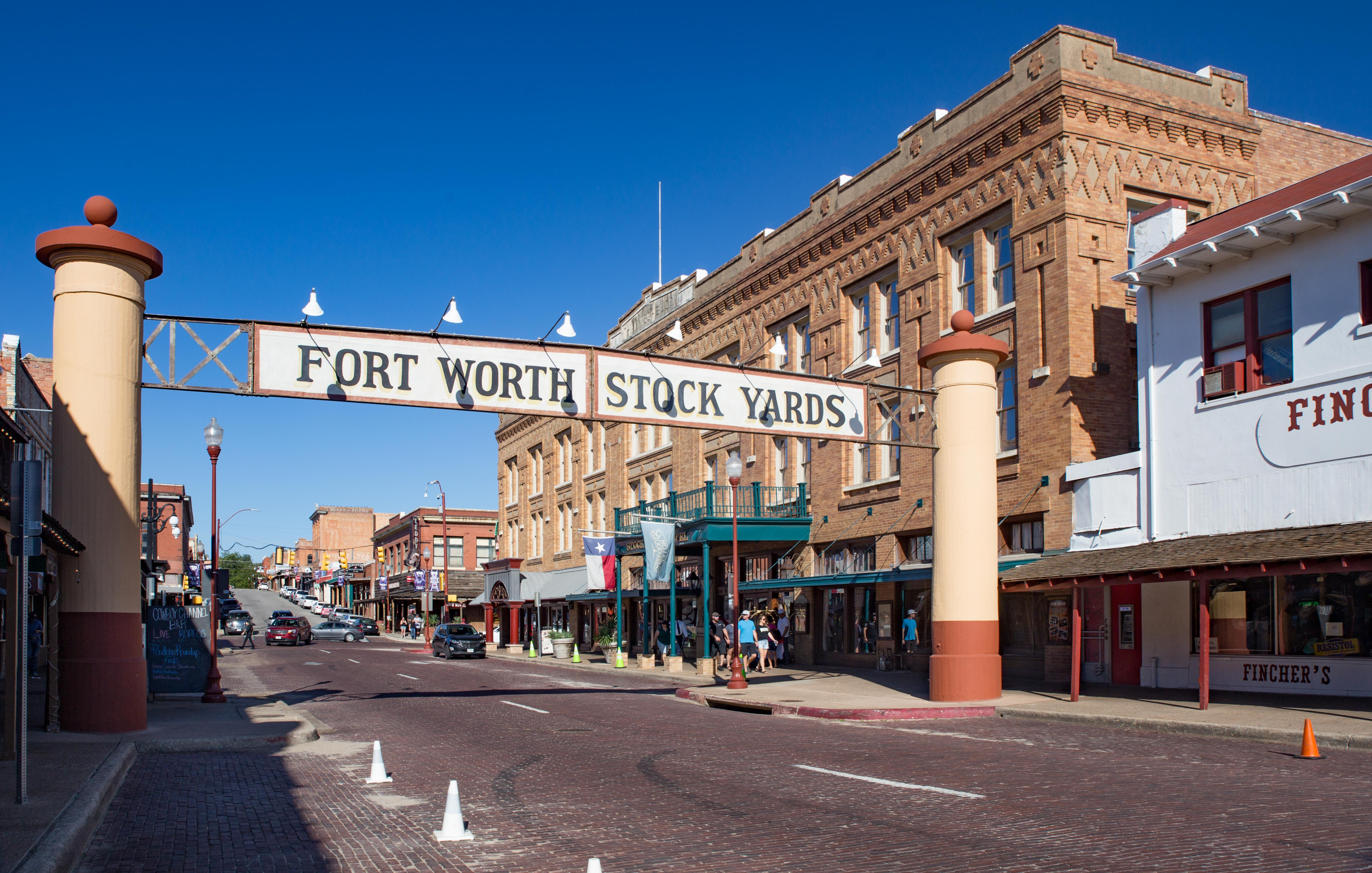
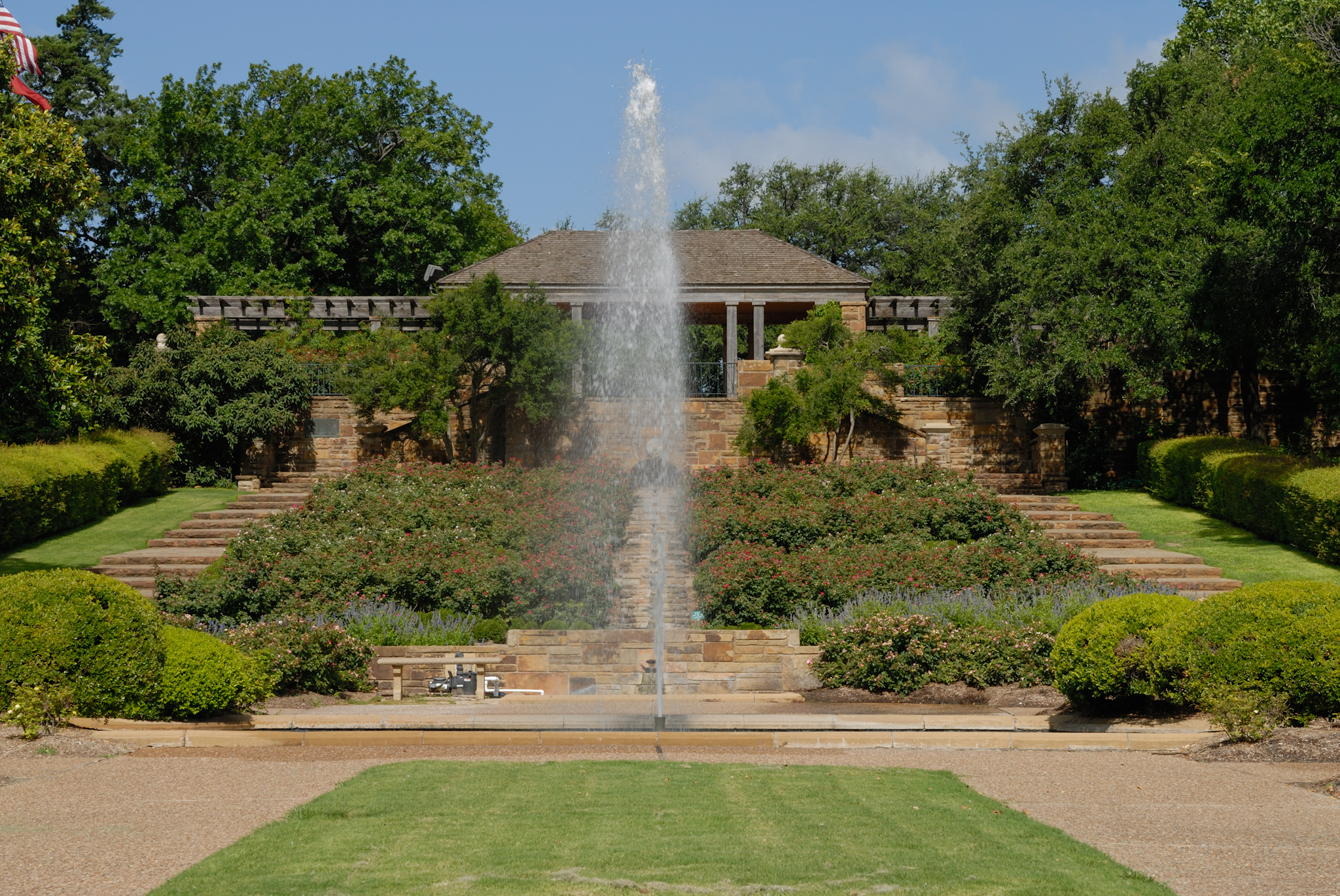
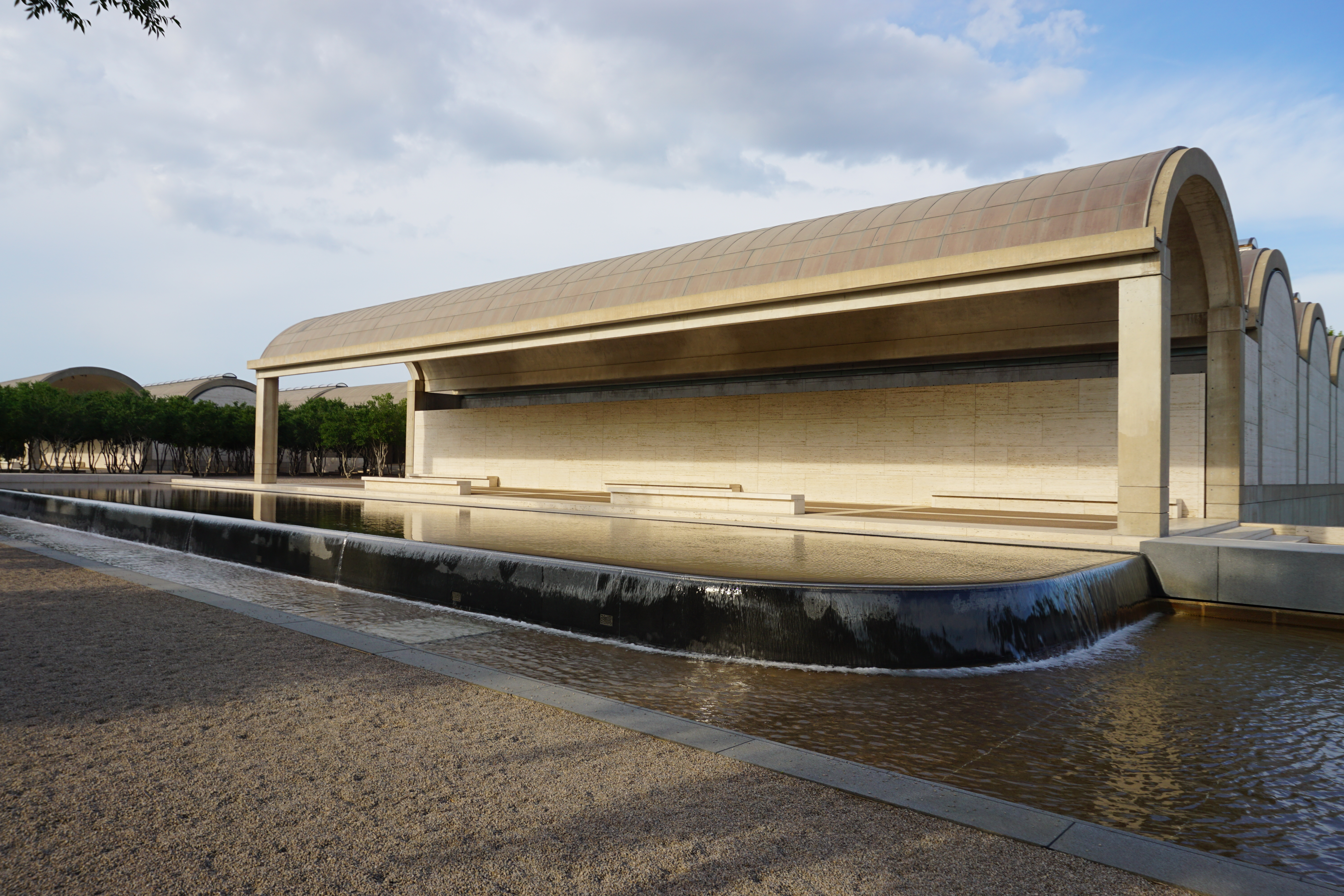
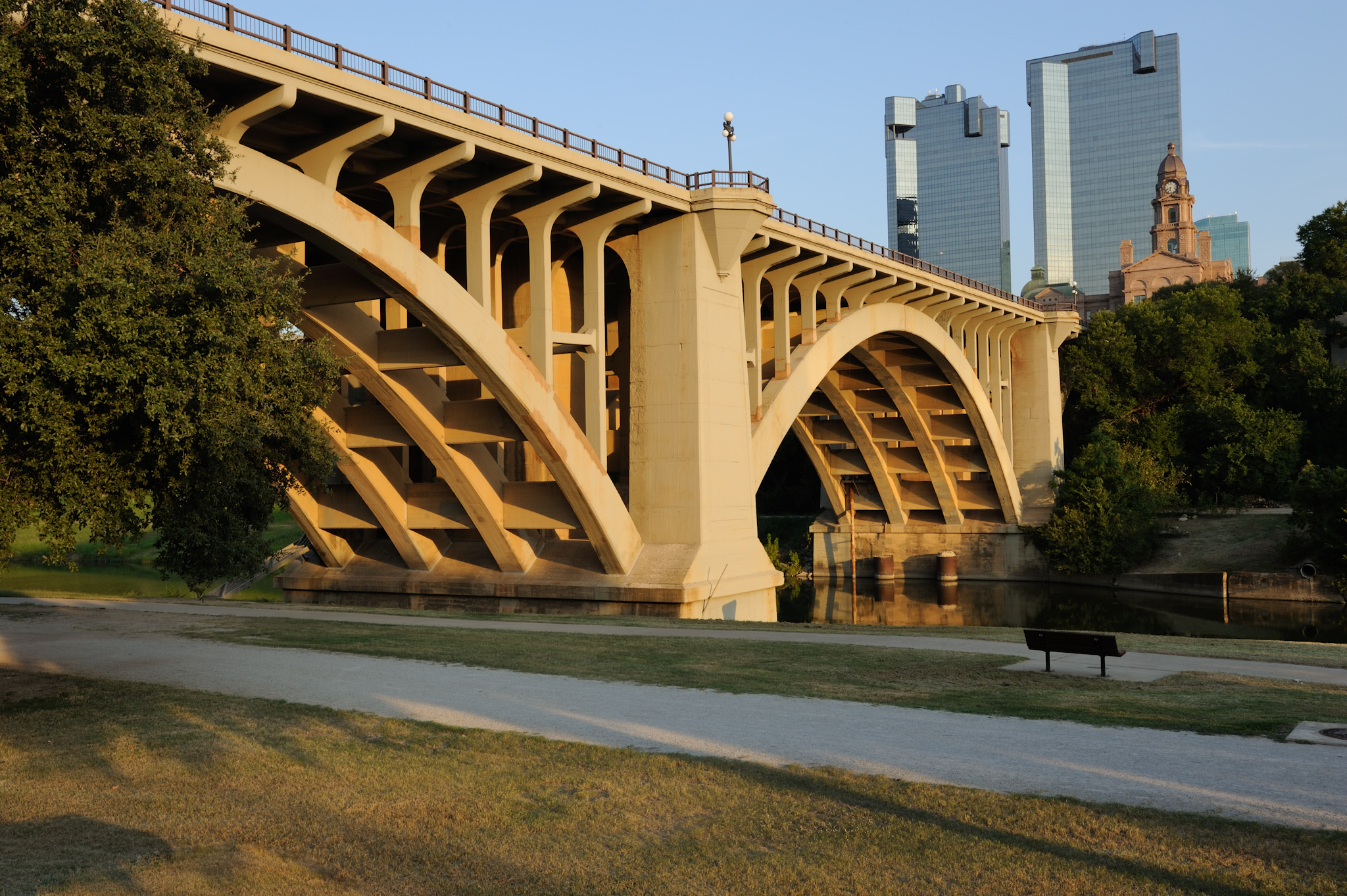
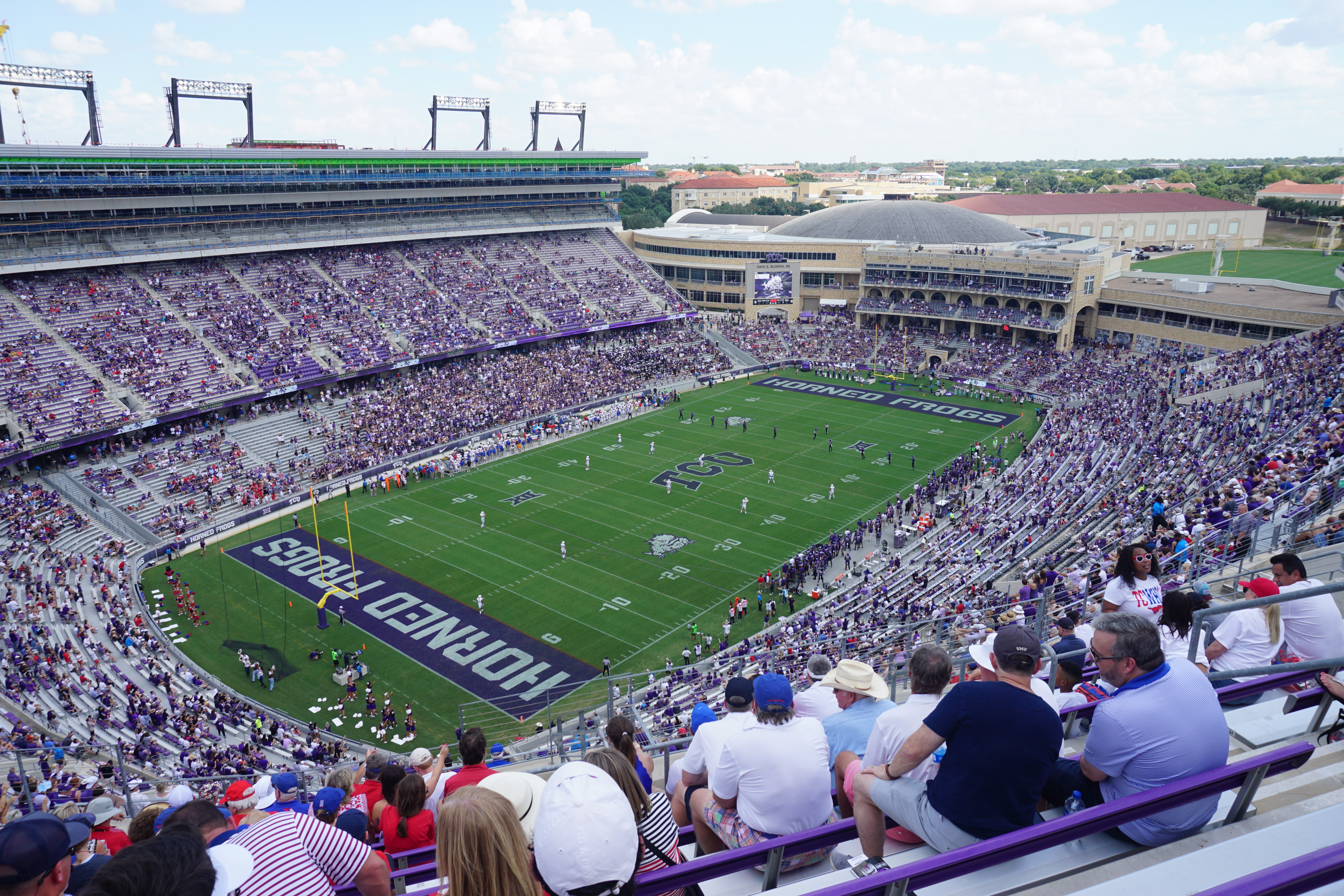
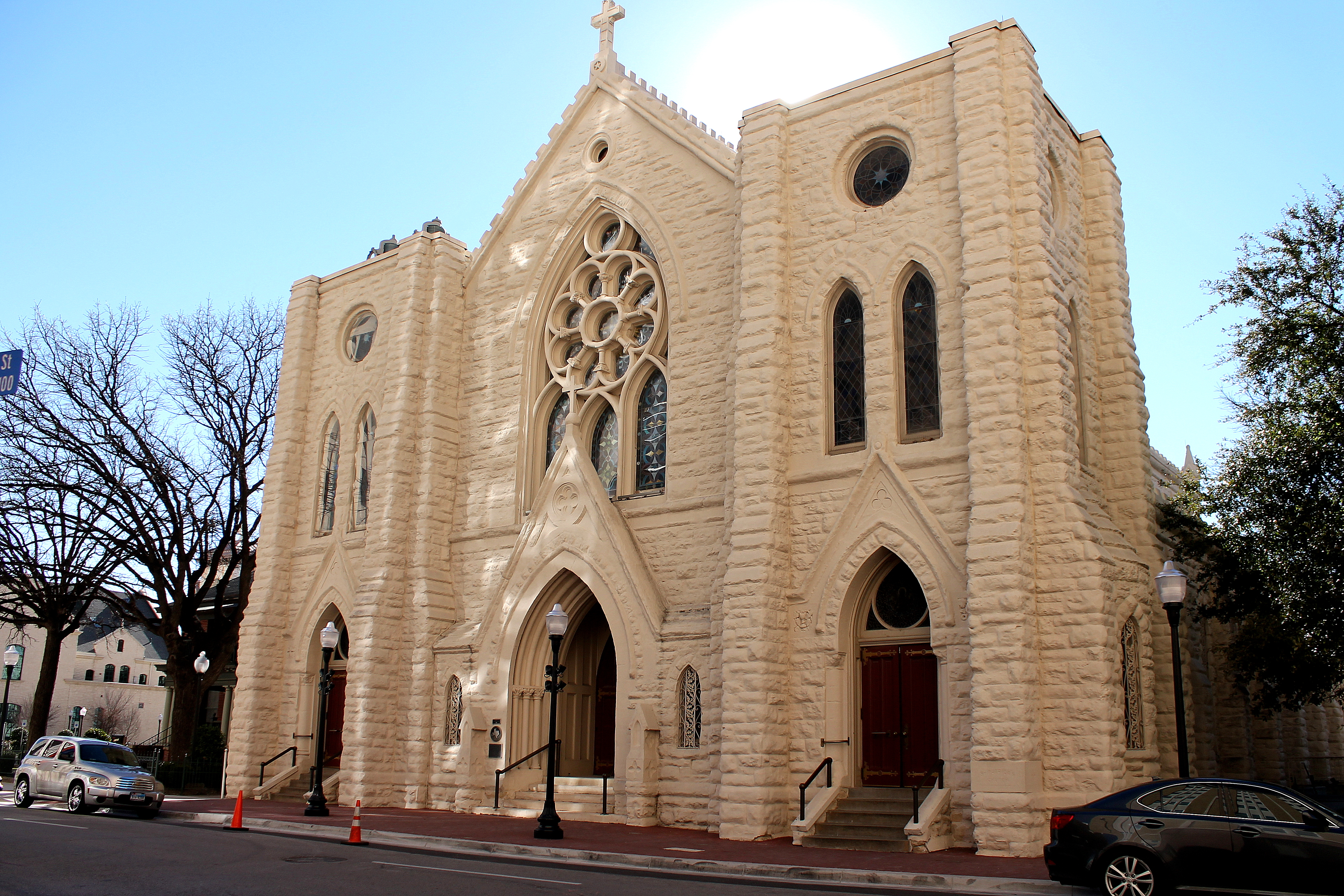
- Downtown Fort Worth Fort Worth Stockyards Fort Worth Botanic Gardens Kimbell Art Museum Paddock Viaduct Amon Carter Stadium St. Patrick Cathedral

- Flag Seal Logo
- Nicknames: Cowtown, Panther City, Funkytown, Queen City of the Prairie
- Motto(s): "Where the West begins"; "Crossroads of Cowboys & Culture"
- Interactive map of Fort Worth
- Location in Texas Location in the United States
- Coordinates: 32°45′23″N 97°19′57″W
- Country: United States
- State: Texas
- Counties: Tarrant, Denton, Johnson, Parker, Wise
- Incorporated: 1874; 152 years ago
- Named for: William J. Worth

Government
  - Type: Mayor–council–manager
  - Mayor: Mattie Parker (R)
  - City manager: Jesus "Jay" Chapa
  - City council: List: • Carlos Flores - District #2; • Michael Crain - District #3; • Charles Lauersdorf - District #4; • Gyna Bivens - District #5; • Jared Williams - District #6; • Macy Hill - District #7; • Chris Nettles - District #8; • Elizabeth Beck - District #9; • Alan Blaylock - District #10; • Jeanette Martinez - District #11

Area
  - City: 355.56 sq mi (920.89 km^{2})
  - Land: 347.28 sq mi (899.44 km^{2})
  - Water: 8.28 sq mi (21.45 km^{2})
- Elevation: 541 ft (165 m)

Population (2020)
  - City: 918,915
  - Estimate (2025): 1,028,117▲
  - Rank: 35th in North America; 10th in the United States; 4th in Texas
  - Density: 2,870.8/sq mi (1,108.4/km^{2})
  - Metro: 7,637,387 (US: 4th)
- Demonym(s): Fort Worthian, Fort Worthite
- Time zone: UTC−6 (CST)
  - Summer (DST): UTC−5 (CDT)
- ZIP Codes: 76008, 76036, 761XX, 76244: 76008, 76036, 76101–76124, 76126–76127, 76129–76137, 76140, 76147–76148, 76150, 76155, 76161–76164, 76166, 76177, 76179–76182, 76185, 76190–76193, 76195–76199, 76244
- Area codes: 682 and 817
- FIPS code: 48-27000
- GNIS feature ID: 2410531
- Website: fortworthtexas.gov

Fort Worth is a city in the U.S. state of Texas. It is the county seat of Tarrant County, covering nearly 350 square miles (910 km^{2}) and extending into Denton, Johnson, Parker, and Wise counties. Fort Worth's population was estimated to be 1,028,117 in 2025, making it the 10th-most populous city in the United States. Fort Worth is the second-largest city in the Dallas–Fort Worth metroplex (after Dallas) and the fourth-most populous in Texas. The Dallas–Fort Worth metroplex is the fourth-most populous metropolitan area in the U.S., with 8.5 million residents.

The city of Fort Worth was established in 1849 as an army outpost on a bluff overlooking the Trinity River. Fort Worth has historically been a center of the Texas Longhorn cattle trade. It still embraces its Western heritage and traditional architecture and design. USS Fort Worth (LCS-3) is the first ship of the United States Navy named after the city. Nearby Dallas has held a population majority in the metropolitan area for as long as records have been kept, yet Fort Worth has become one of the fastest-growing cities in the United States.

The city is the location of the Van Cliburn International Piano Competition and several museums designed by contemporary architects. The Kimbell Art Museum was designed by Louis Kahn, with an addition designed by Renzo Piano. The Modern Art Museum of Fort Worth was designed by Tadao Ando. The Amon Carter Museum of American Art, designed by Philip Johnson, houses American art. The Sid Richardson Museum, redesigned by David M. Schwarz, has a collection of Western art in the United States emphasizing Frederic Remington and Charles Russell. The Fort Worth Museum of Science and History was designed by Ricardo Legorreta of Mexico.

In addition, Fort Worth is the location of several universities, including the University of Texas at Arlington, Texas Christian University, Texas Wesleyan University, UNT Health Fort Worth, and Texas A&M University School of Law. Several multinational corporations, including Bell Textron, American Airlines, and BNSF Railway, are headquartered in Fort Worth.

== History ==
The Treaty of Bird's Fort between the Republic of Texas and several Native American tribes was signed in 1843 at Bird's Fort in present-day Arlington, Texas. Article XI of the treaty provided that no one may "pass the line of trading houses" (at the border of the Indians' territory) without permission of the President of Texas, and may not reside or remain in the Indians' territory. These "trading houses" were later established at the junction of the Clear Fork and West Fork of the Trinity River in present-day Fort Worth.

A line of seven army posts was established in 1848–1849 after the Mexican War to protect the settlers of Texas along the western American Frontier and included Fort Worth, Fort Graham, Fort Gates, Fort Croghan, Fort Martin Scott, Fort Lincoln, and Fort Duncan. Originally, 10 forts had been proposed by Major General William Jenkins Worth (1794–1849), who commanded the Department of Texas in 1849. In January 1849, Worth proposed a line of 10 forts to mark the western Texas frontier from Eagle Pass to the confluence of the West Fork and Clear Fork of the Trinity River. One month later, Worth died from cholera in South Texas.

General William S. Harney assumed command of the Department of Texas and ordered Major Ripley A. Arnold (Company F, Second United States Dragoons) to find a new fort site near the West Fork and Clear Fork. On June 6, 1849, Arnold, advised by Middleton Tate Johnson, established a camp on the bank of the Trinity River and named the post Camp Worth in honor of the late General Worth. In August 1849, Arnold moved the camp to the north-facing bluff, which overlooked the mouth of the Clear Fork of the Trinity River. The United States War Department officially named the post Fort Worth on November 14, 1849. Since its establishment, the city of Fort Worth continues to be known as "where the West begins".

E. S. Terrell (1812–1905) from Tennessee claimed to be the first resident of Fort Worth. The fort was flooded the first year and moved to the top of the bluff; the current courthouse was built on this site. The fort was abandoned September 17, 1853. No trace of it remains.

As a stop on the Chisholm Trail, Fort Worth was stimulated by the business of the cattle drives and became a brawling, bustling town. Millions of head of cattle were driven north to market along this trail. Fort Worth became the center of the cattle drives, and later, the ranching industry. It was given the nickname of Cowtown.

During the American Civil War, Fort Worth suffered from shortages of money, food, and supplies. The population dropped as low as 175, but began to recover during Reconstruction. By 1872, Jacob Samuels, William Jesse Boaz, and William Henry Davis had opened general stores. The next year, Khleber M. Van Zandt established Tidball, Van Zandt, and Company, which became Fort Worth National Bank in 1884.

In 1875, the Dallas Herald published an article by a former Fort Worth lawyer, Robert E. Cowart, who wrote that the decimation of Fort Worth's population, caused by the economic disaster and hard winter of 1873, had dealt a severe blow to the cattle industry. Added to the slowdown due to the railroad's stopping the laying of track 30 miles (48 km) outside of Fort Worth, Cowart said that Fort Worth was so slow that he saw a panther asleep in the street by the courthouse. Although an intended insult, the name Panther City was enthusiastically embraced when in 1876 Fort Worth recovered economically. Many businesses and organizations continue to use Panther in their name. A panther is set at the top of the police department badges.

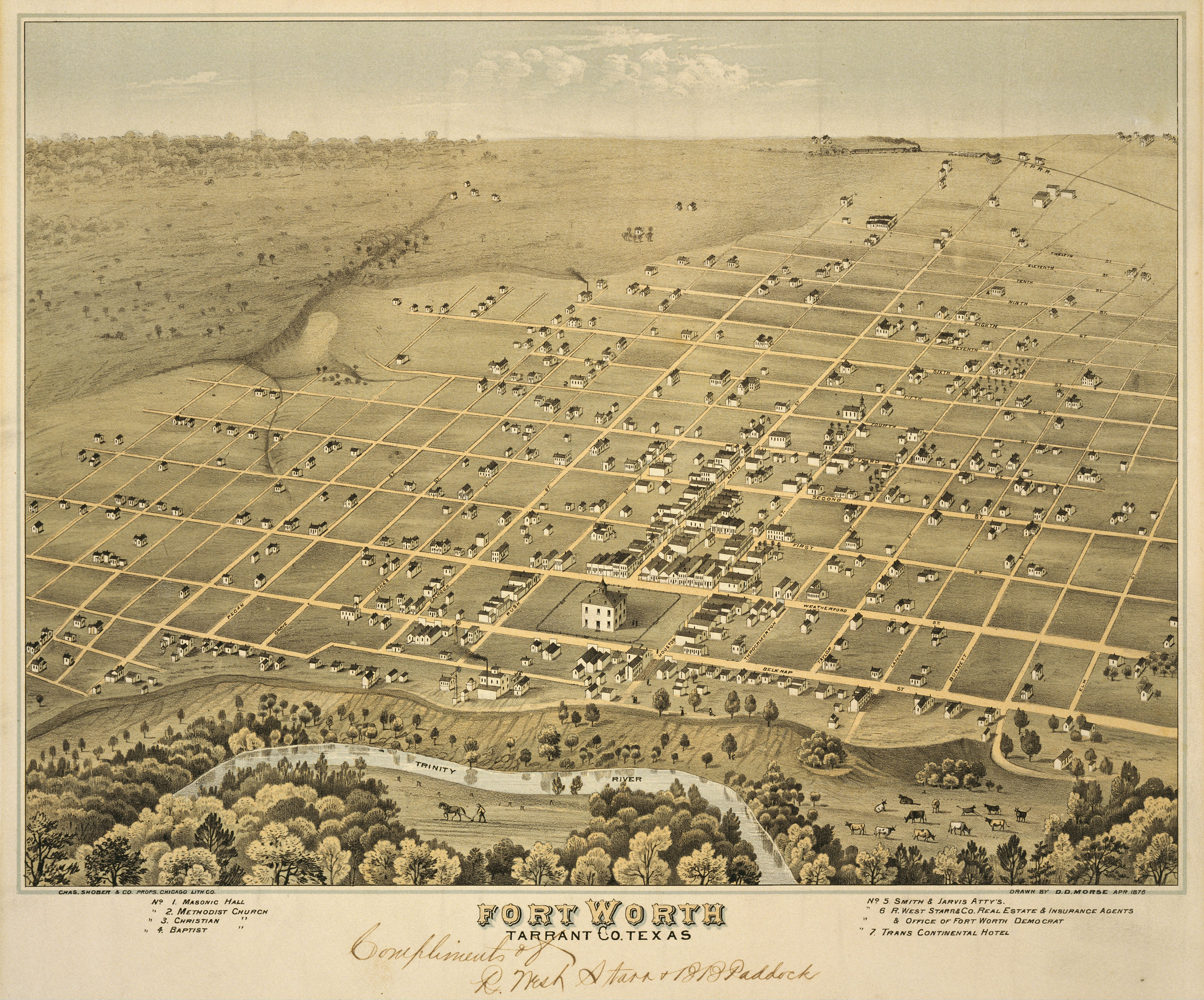
Lithograph of Fort Worth, 1876

The "Panther City" tradition is also preserved in the names and design of some of the city's geographical/architectural features, such as Panther Island (in the Trinity River), the Flat Iron Building, Fort Worth Central Station, and in two or three "Sleeping Panther" statues.

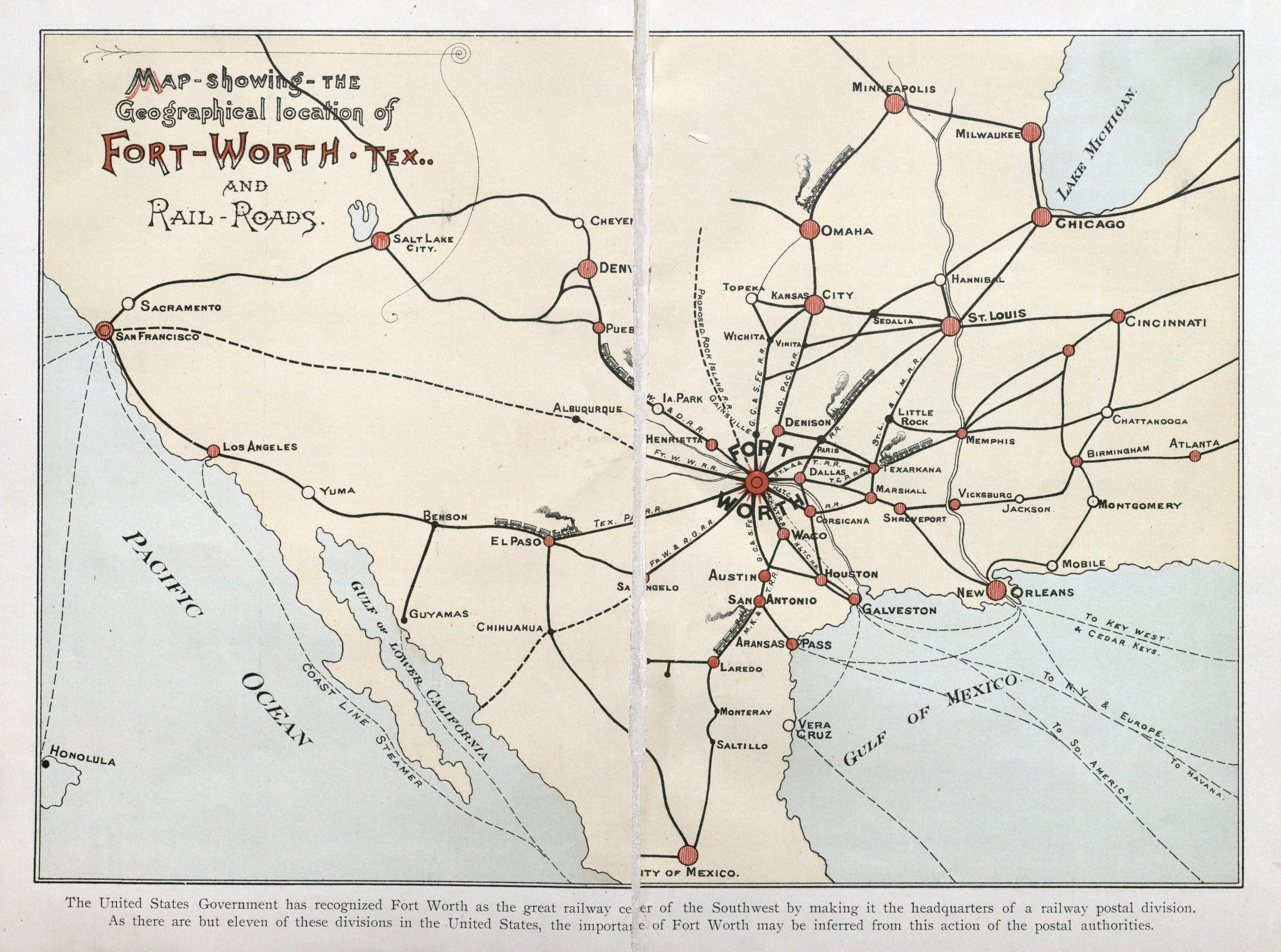
Map – showing – the Geographical location of Fort-Worth, Tex., and Rail-Roads, 1888

In 1876, the Texas and Pacific Railway finally was completed to Fort Worth, stimulating a boom and transforming the Fort Worth Stockyards into a premier center for the cattle wholesale trade. Migrants from the devastated war-torn South continued to swell the population, and small, community factories and mills yielded to larger businesses. Newly dubbed the "Queen City of the Prairies", Fort Worth supplied a regional market via the growing transportation network.

Fort Worth became the westernmost railhead and a transit point for cattle shipment. Louville Niles, a Boston, Massachusetts-based businessman and main shareholder of the Fort Worth Stockyards Company, is credited with bringing the two biggest meatpacking firms at the time, Armour and Swift, to the stockyards.

With the boom times came a variety of entertainments and related problems. Fort Worth had a knack for separating cattlemen from their money. Cowboys took full advantage of their last brush with civilization before the long drive on the Chisholm Trail from Fort Worth north to Kansas. They stocked up on provisions from local merchants, visited saloons for a bit of gambling and carousing, then rode northward with their cattle, only to whoop it up again on their way back. The town soon became home to "Hell's Half-Acre", the biggest collection of saloons, dance halls, and bawdy houses south of Dodge City (the northern terminus of the Chisholm Trail), giving Fort Worth the nickname of the "Paris of the Plains".

Certain sections of town were off-limits for proper citizens. Shootings, knifings, muggings, and brawls became a nightly occurrence. Cowboys were joined by a motley assortment of buffalo hunters, gunmen, adventurers, and crooks. Hell's Half Acre (also known as simply "The Acre") expanded as more people were drawn to the town. Occasionally, the Acre was referred to as "the bloody Third Ward" after it was designated one of the city's three political wards in 1876. By 1900, the Acre covered four of the city's main north-south thoroughfares. Local citizens became alarmed about the activities, electing Timothy Isaiah "Longhair Jim" Courtright in 1876 as city marshal with a mandate to tame it.

Courtright sometimes collected and jailed 30 people on a Saturday night, but allowed the gamblers to operate, as they attracted money to the city. After learning that train and stagecoach robbers, such as the Sam Bass gang, were using the area as a hideout, he intensified law enforcement, but certain businessmen advertised against too many restrictions in the area as having bad effects on the legitimate businesses. Gradually, the cowboys began to avoid the area; as businesses suffered, the city moderated its opposition. Courtright lost his office in 1879.

Despite crusading mayors such as H.S. Broiles and newspaper editors such as B. B. Paddock, the Acre survived because it generated income for the city (all of it illegal) and excitement for visitors. Longtime Fort Worth residents claimed the place was never as wild as its reputation, but during the 1880s, Fort Worth was a regular stop on the "gambler's circuit" by Bat Masterson, Doc Holliday, and the Earp brothers (Wyatt, Morgan, and Virgil). James Earp, the eldest of his brothers, lived with his wife in Fort Worth during this period; their house was at the edge of Hell's Half Acre, at 9th and Calhoun. He often tended bar at the Cattlemen's Exchange saloon in the "uptown" part of the city.

Reforming citizens objected to the dance halls, where men and women mingled; by contrast, the saloons or gambling parlors had primarily male customers.

In the late 1880s, Mayor Broiles and County Attorney R. L. Carlock initiated a reform campaign. In a public shootout on February 8, 1887, Jim Courtright was killed on Main Street by Luke Short, who claimed he was "King of Fort Worth Gamblers". As Courtright had been popular, when Short was jailed for his murder, rumors floated of lynching him. Short's good friend Bat Masterson came armed and spent the night in his cell to protect him.

The first prohibition campaign in Texas was mounted in Fort Worth in 1889, allowing other business and residential development in the area. Another change was the influx of Black and African American residents. Excluded by state segregation from the business end of town and the more costly residential areas, the city's black citizens settled into the southern portion of the city. The popularity and profitability of the Acre declined and more derelicts and the homeless were seen on the streets. By 1900, most of the dance halls and gamblers were gone. Cheap variety shows and prostitution became the chief forms of entertainment. Some progressive politicians launched an offensive to seek out and abolish these perceived "vices" as part of the broader Progressive Era package of reforms.

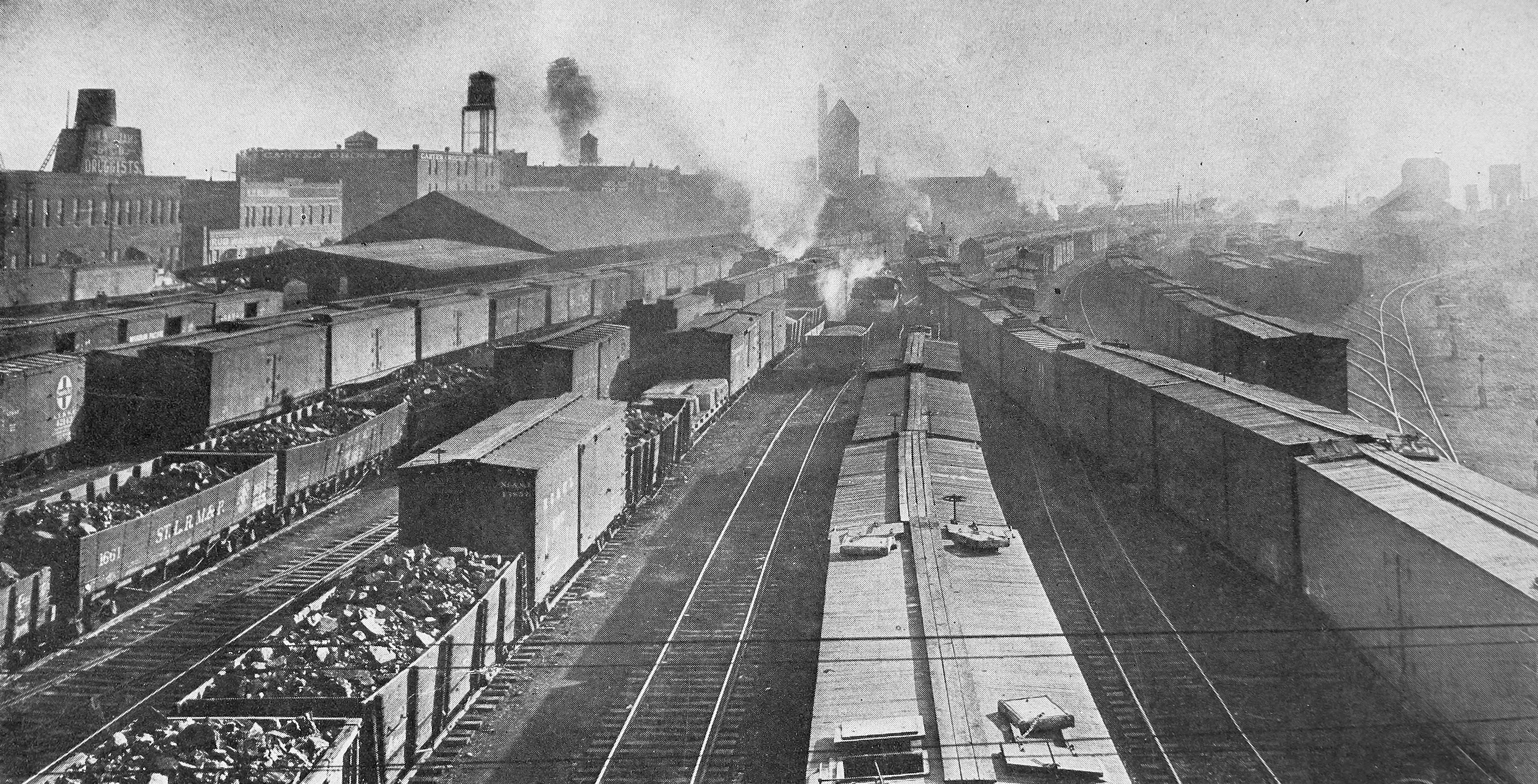
Texas and Pacific Railway yard in Fort Worth, 1916

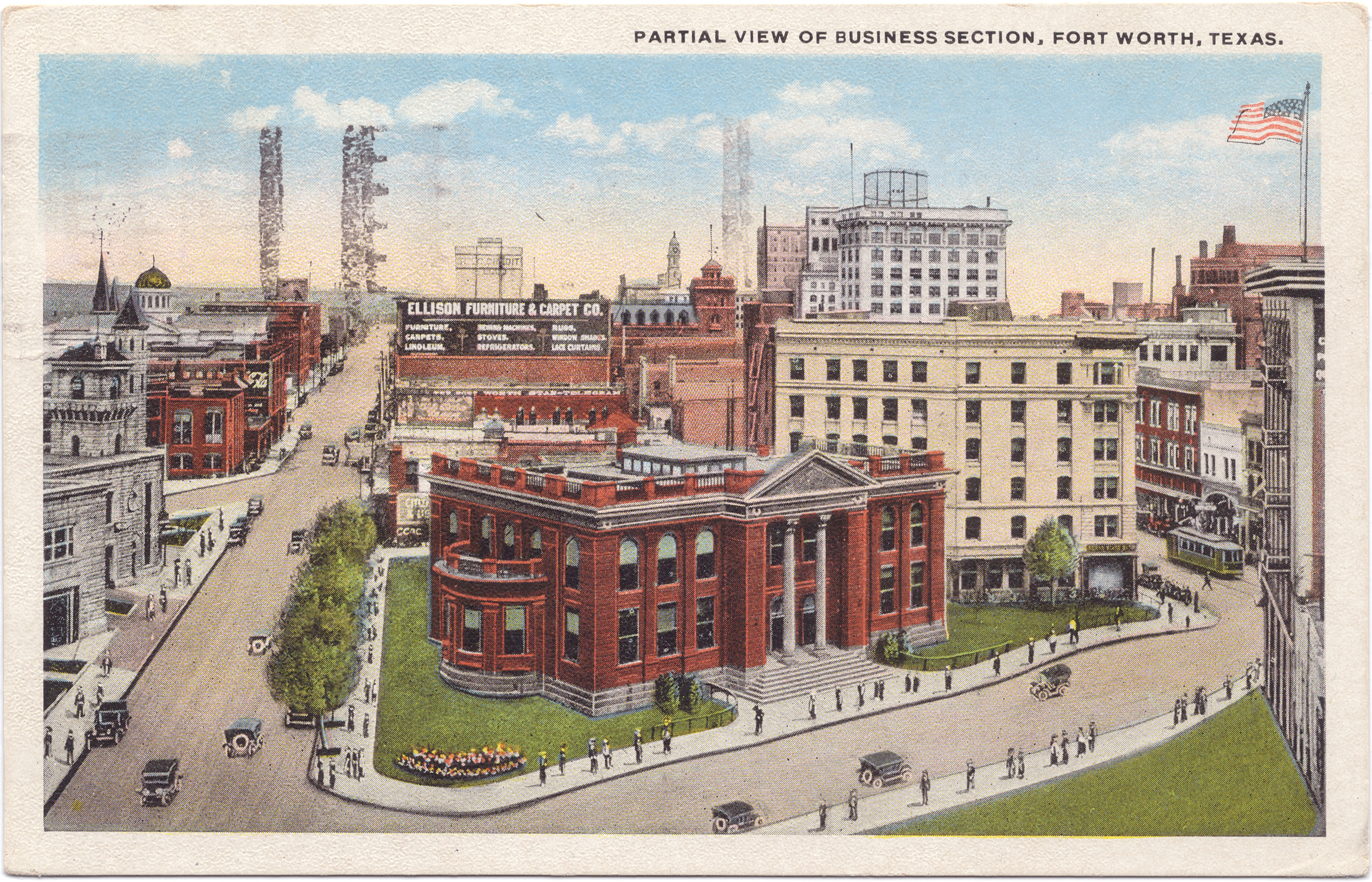
Postcard of the Fort Worth business district, 1921

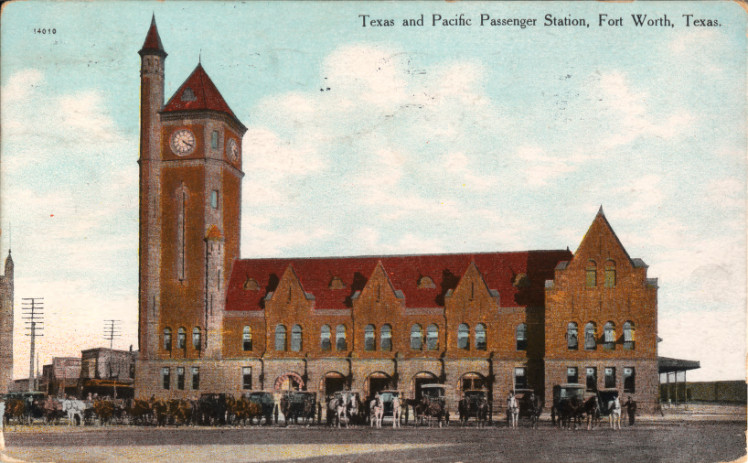
Texas and Pacific Passenger Station, Fort Worth (postcard, circa 1909)

In 1911, the Reverend J. Frank Norris launched an offensive against racetrack gambling in the Baptist Standard and used the pulpit of the First Baptist Church of Fort Worth to attack vice and prostitution. When he began to link certain Fort Worth businessmen with property in the Acre and announced their names from his pulpit, the battle heated up. On February 4, 1912, Norris's church was burned to the ground; that evening, his enemies tossed a bundle of burning oiled rags onto his porch, but the fire was extinguished and caused minimal damage. A month later, the arsonists succeeded in burning down the parsonage. In a sensational trial lasting a month, Norris was charged with perjury and arson in connection with the two fires. He was acquitted, but his continued attacks on the Acre accomplished little until 1917. A new city administration and the federal government, which was eyeing Fort Worth as a potential site for a major military training camp, joined forces with the Baptist preacher to bring down the final curtain on the Acre.

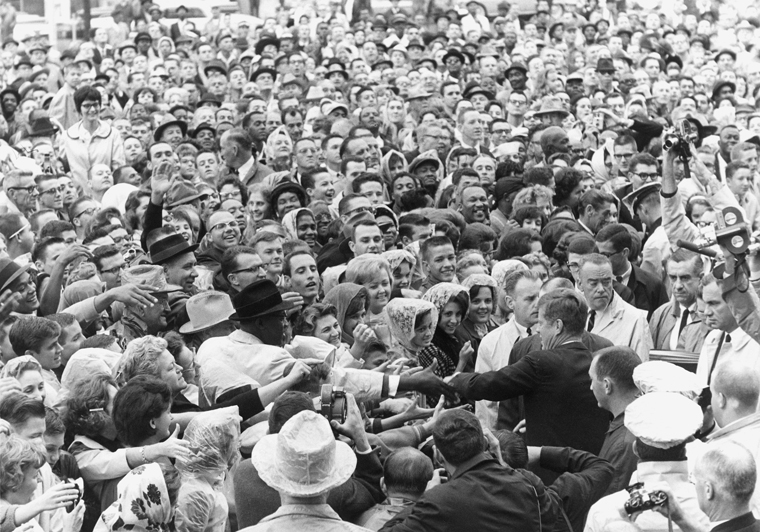
President Kennedy in Fort Worth on Friday morning, November 22, 1963. He was assassinated in Dallas later in the day.

The police department compiled statistics showing that 50% of the violent crime in Fort Worth occurred in the Acre, which confirmed respectable citizens' opinion of the area. After Camp Bowie (a World War I U.S. Army training installation) was located on the outskirts of Fort Worth in 1917, the military used martial law to regulate prostitutes and barkeepers of the Acre. Fines and stiff jail sentences curtailed their activities. By the time Norris held a mock funeral parade to "bury John Barleycorn" in 1919, the Acre had become a part of Fort Worth history. The name continues to be associated with the southern end of Fort Worth.

In 1921, the whites-only union workers in the Fort Worth, Swift & Co. meatpacking plant in the Niles City Stockyards went on strike. The owners attempted to replace them with black strikebreakers. During union protests, strikebreaker African-American Fred Rouse was lynched on a tree at the corner of NE 12th Street and Samuels Avenue. After he was hanged a white mob riddled his mutilated body with gunshots.

On November 21, 1963, President John F. Kennedy arrived in Fort Worth, speaking the next morning before a breakfast meeting of the Fort Worth Chamber of Commerce, then proceeding to Dallas where he was assassinated later that day.

When oil began to gush in West Texas in the early 20th century, and again in the late 1970s, Fort Worth was at the center of the boom. By July 2007, advances in horizontal drilling technology made vast natural gas reserves in the Barnett Shale available directly under the city, helping many residents receive royalty checks for their mineral rights. Today, the City of Fort Worth and many residents are dealing with the benefits and issues associated with the natural-gas reserves underground.

On March 28, 2000, at 6:18 pm, an F3 tornado struck downtown Fort Worth, severely damaging many buildings. One of the hardest-hit structures was the Bank One Tower, which was one of the dominant features of the Fort Worth skyline and which had "Reata," a popular restaurant, on its top floor. It has since been converted to upscale condominiums and officially renamed "The Tower." This was the first major tornado to strike Fort Worth proper since the early 1940s.

From 2000 to 2006, Fort Worth was the fastest-growing large city in the United States; it was voted one of "America's Most Livable Communities". In addition to the reversal migration, many African Americans have been relocating to Fort Worth for its affordable cost of living and job opportunities.

In 2020, Fort Worth's mayor announced the city's continued growth to 20.78%. The U.S. Census Bureau also noted the city's beginning of greater diversification from 2014–2018.

== Geography ==
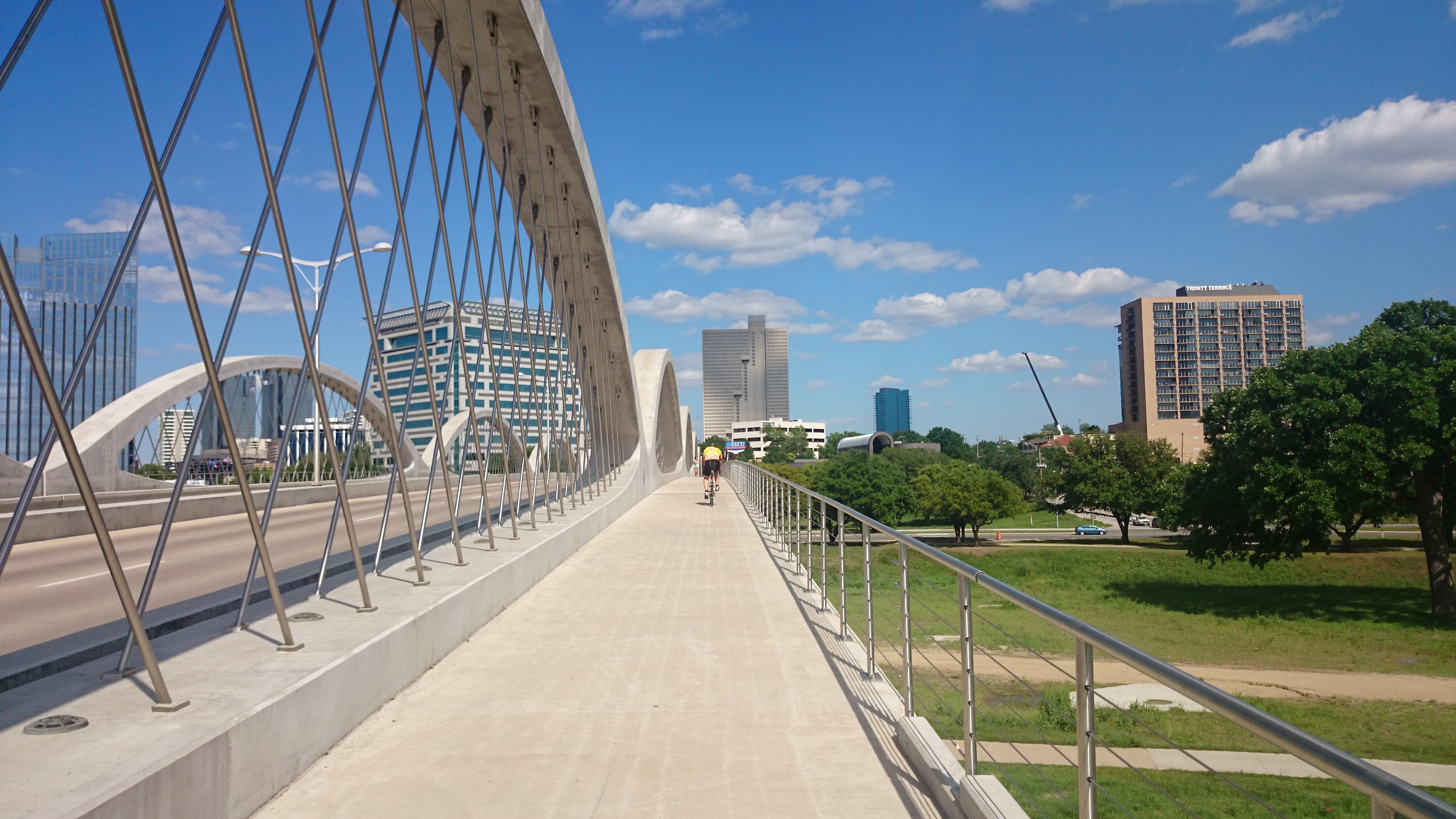
W 7th Bridge bikeway, 2015

Fort Worth is located in North Texas, and has a generally humid subtropical climate. It is part of the Cross Timbers region; this region is a boundary between the more heavily forested eastern parts and the rolling hills and prairies of the central part. Specifically, the city is part of the Grand Prairie ecoregion within the Cross Timbers. According to the United States Census Bureau, the city has a total area of 349.2 square miles (904 km^{2}), of which 342.2 square miles (886 km^{2}) are land and 7.0 square miles (18 km^{2}) are covered by water. It is a principal city in the Dallas–Fort Worth metroplex, and the second largest by population.

The city of Fort Worth is not entirely contiguous and has several enclaves, practical enclaves, semi-enclaves, and cities that are otherwise completely or nearly surrounded by it, including: Westworth Village, River Oaks, Saginaw, Blue Mound, Benbrook, Everman, Forest Hill, Edgecliff Village, Westover Hills, White Settlement, Sansom Park, Lake Worth, Lakeside, and Haslet.

Fort Worth contains over 1,000 natural-gas wells (December 2009 count) tapping the Barnett Shale. Each well site is a bare patch of gravel 2–5 acres (8,100–20,200 m^{2}) in size. As city ordinances permit them in all zoning categories, including residential, well sites can be found in a variety of locations. Some wells are surrounded by masonry fences, but most are secured by chain link.

A large storage dam was completed in 1914 on the West Fork of the Trinity River, 7 miles (11 km) from the city, with a storage capacity of 33,495 acre feet of water. The lake formed by this dam is known as Lake Worth.

=== Neighborhoods ===
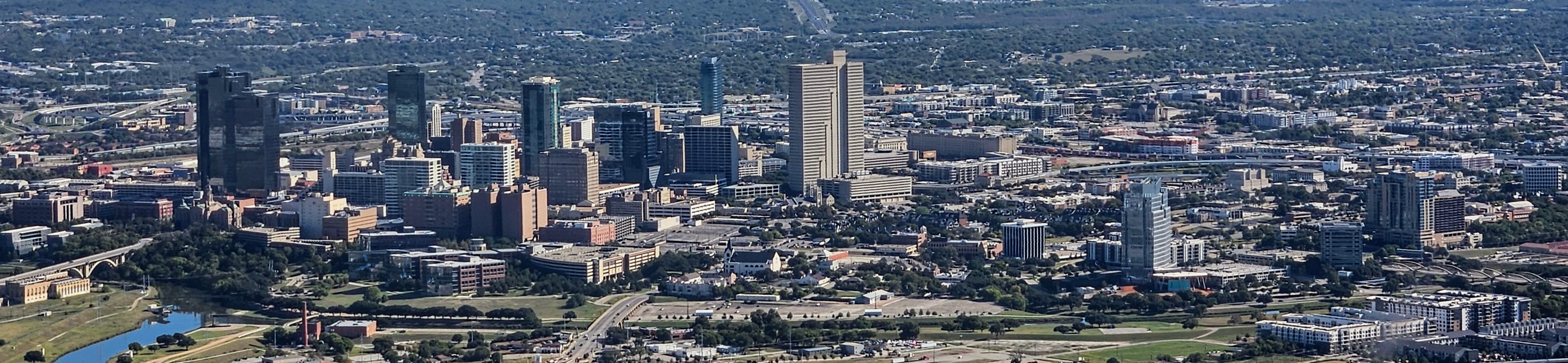
Skyline of Fort Worth

==== Downtown ====
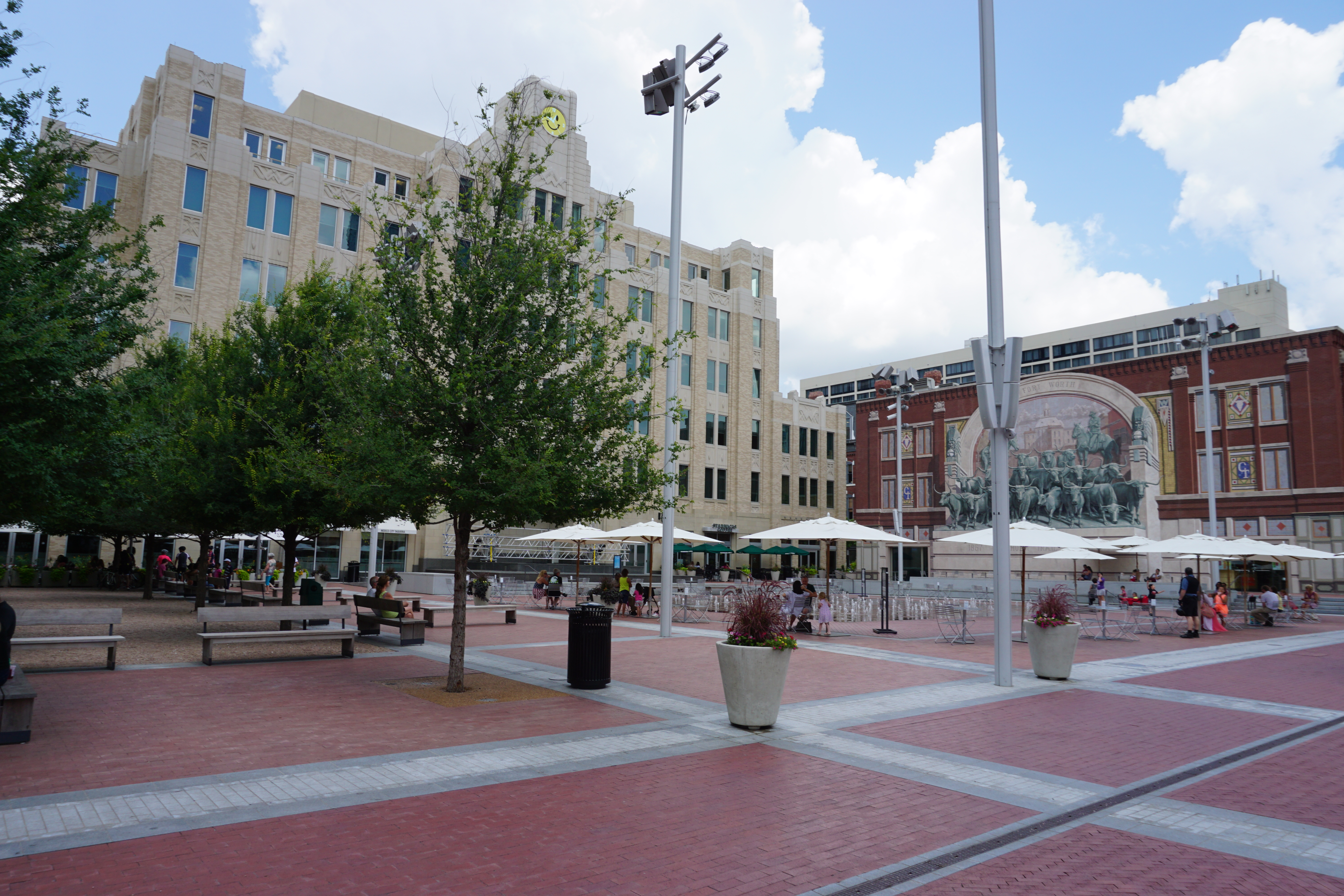
Sundance Square Plaza, 2016

Downtown Fort Worth consists of numerous districts consisting of commercial and retail, residential, and entertainment. Among them, Sundance Square is a mixed-use district and popular for nightlife and entertainment. The Bass Performance Hall is located within Sundance Square. Nearby Upper West Side is also a notable district within downtown Fort Worth. It is bound roughly by Henderson Street to the east, the Trinity River to the west, Interstate 30 to the south, and White Settlement Road to the north. The neighborhood contains several small and mid-sized office buildings and urban residences, but very little retail.

==== Stockyards ====
The Fort Worth Stockyards are a National Historic District. The Stockyards was once among the largest livestock markets in the United States and played a vital role in the city's early growth. Today the neighborhood is characterized by its many bars, restaurants, and notable country music venues such as Billy Bob's. Fort Worth celebrity chef Tim Love of Iron Chef America and Top Chef Masters has operated multiple restaurants in the neighborhood. There is a mall at the Stockyards Station and a train via the Grapevine Vintage Railroad that connects to downtown Grapevine. Cowtown Coliseum hosts a weekly rodeo and also has the Texas Cowboy Hall of Fame. The world's largest honky tonk is also in the Stockyards at Billy Bob's. At the Fort Worth Stockyards, Fort Worth is the only major city that hosts a daily cattle drive.

==== Tanglewood ====
Tanglewood consists of land in the low areas along the branch of the Trinity River and is approximately five miles southwest from the Fort Worth central business district. The Tanglewood area lies within two surveys. The western part of the addition is part of the 1854 Felix G. Beasley survey, and the eastern part, along the branch of the river, is the 1876 James Howard survey. The original approach to the Tanglewood area consisted of a two-rut dirt road, which is now Bellaire Drive South. Up to the time of development, children enjoyed swimming in the river in a deep hole that was located where the bridge is now on Bellaire Drive South near Trinity Commons Shopping Center. The portions of Tanglewood that are now Bellaire Park Court, Marquette Court, and Autumn Court were originally a dairy farm.

=== Architecture ===
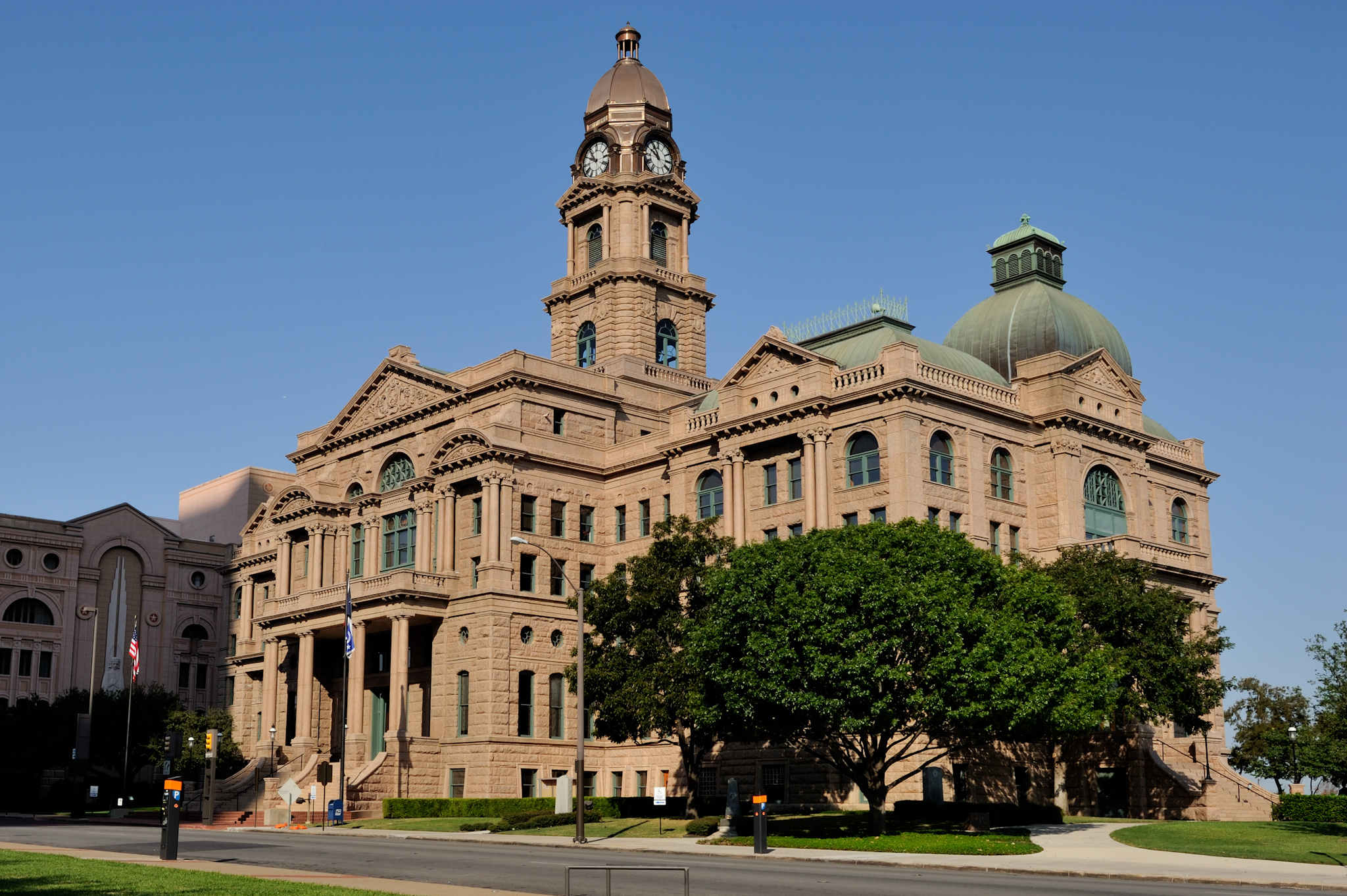
Tarrant County Courthouse

Downtown Fort Worth, with its unique rustic architecture, is mainly known for its Art Deco-style buildings. The Tarrant County Courthouse was designed in the American Beaux-Arts design, which was modeled after the Texas State Capitol building. Most of the structures around downtown's Sundance Square have preserved their early 20th-century façades. Multiple blocks surrounding Sundance Square are illuminated at night in Christmas lights year-round.

=== Climate ===
Fort Worth has a humid subtropical climate (Cfa) according to the Köppen climate classification system, and is within USDA hardiness zone 8a. This region features very hot, humid summers and mild winters. The hottest month of the year is August, when the average high temperature is 96 °F (35.6 °C), and overnight low temperatures average 75 °F (23.9 °C), giving an average temperature of 85 °F (29.4 °C). The coldest month of the year is January, when the average high temperature is 56 °F (13.3 °C) and low temperatures average 35 °F (1.7 °C). The average temperature in January is 46 °F (8 °C). The highest temperature ever recorded in Fort Worth is 113 °F (45.0 °C), on June 26, 1980, during the Great 1980 Heat Wave, and June 27, 1980. The coldest temperature ever recorded in Fort Worth was −8 °F (−22.2 °C) on February 12, 1899. Because of its position in North Texas, Fort Worth is very susceptible to supercell thunderstorms, which produce large hail and can produce tornadoes.

The average annual precipitation for Fort Worth is 34.01 inches (863.9 mm). The wettest month of the year is May, when an average of 4.58 inches (116.3 mm) of precipitation falls. The driest month of the year is January, when only 1.70 inches (43.2 mm) of precipitation falls. The driest calendar year since records began has been 1921 with 17.91 inches (454.9 mm) and the wettest 2015 with 62.61 inches (1,590.3 mm). The wettest calendar month has been April 1922 with 17.64 inches (448.1 mm), including 8.56 inches (217.4 mm) on April 25.

The average annual snowfall in Fort Worth is 2.6 inches (66.0 mm). The most snowfall in one month has been 13.5 inches (342.9 mm) in February 1978, and the most in a season 17.6 inches (447.0 mm) in 1977/1978.

The National Weather Service office, which serves the Dallas–Fort Worth metroplex, is based in northeastern Fort Worth.

Climate data for Fort Worth Meacham International Airport, Texas (1991–2020 normals, extremes 1940–present)
Month	Jan	Feb	Mar	Apr	May	Jun	Jul	Aug	Sep	Oct	Nov	Dec	Year
Record high °F (°C)	88 (31)	97 (36)	96 (36)	102 (39)	101 (38)	107 (42)	112 (44)	110 (43)	112 (44)	106 (41)	95 (35)	90 (32)	112 (44)
Mean maximum °F (°C)	78.1 (25.6)	81.1 (27.3)	86.0 (30.0)	89.5 (31.9)	95.5 (35.3)	99.6 (37.6)	103.6 (39.8)	104.3 (40.2)	99.3 (37.4)	92.7 (33.7)	83.2 (28.4)	78.1 (25.6)	105.7 (40.9)
Mean daily maximum °F (°C)	56.4 (13.6)	60.5 (15.8)	68.0 (20.0)	75.6 (24.2)	83.5 (28.6)	91.5 (33.1)	95.7 (35.4)	95.9 (35.5)	88.3 (31.3)	77.9 (25.5)	66.2 (19.0)	57.8 (14.3)	76.4 (24.7)
Daily mean °F (°C)	45.8 (7.7)	49.8 (9.9)	57.3 (14.1)	64.7 (18.2)	73.3 (22.9)	81.4 (27.4)	85.1 (29.5)	85.2 (29.6)	77.7 (25.4)	66.9 (19.4)	55.7 (13.2)	47.5 (8.6)	65.9 (18.8)
Mean daily minimum °F (°C)	35.3 (1.8)	39.1 (3.9)	46.5 (8.1)	53.8 (12.1)	63.1 (17.3)	71.2 (21.8)	74.6 (23.7)	74.5 (23.6)	67.1 (19.5)	55.9 (13.3)	45.3 (7.4)	37.3 (2.9)	55.3 (12.9)
Mean minimum °F (°C)	19.9 (−6.7)	23.2 (−4.9)	28.5 (−1.9)	37.6 (3.1)	49.1 (9.5)	62.0 (16.7)	68.8 (20.4)	66.8 (19.3)	53.9 (12.2)	39.7 (4.3)	29.3 (−1.5)	22.1 (−5.5)	16.5 (−8.6)
Record low °F (°C)	−2 (−19)	−2 (−19)	10 (−12)	28 (−2)	38 (3)	52 (11)	60 (16)	58 (14)	40 (4)	24 (−4)	19 (−7)	10 (−12)	−2 (−19)
Average precipitation inches (mm)	2.05 (52)	2.41 (61)	3.16 (80)	3.06 (78)	4.02 (102)	4.02 (102)	2.18 (55)	2.23 (57)	2.59 (66)	4.46 (113)	2.52 (64)	2.64 (67)	35.34 (898)
Average precipitation days	7.2	6.1	7.5	7.2	9.3	7.2	4.7	4.5	5.8	7.1	6.7	6.5	79.8
Mean monthly sunshine hours	186.0	169.5	217.0	240.0	248.0	300.0	341.0	310.0	240.0	217.0	180.0	186.0	2,834.5
Percentage possible sunshine	60	55	58	62	57	71	79	77	67	64	60	60	64
Average ultraviolet index	3	5	7	9	10	11	10	10	8	6	4	3	7
Source 1: National Climatic Data Center
Source 2: Weather Atlas (sunshine data, UV index)

Climate data for Fort Worth (Dallas Fort Worth International Airport), 1991–2020 normals, (Note: Mean monthly maxima and minima calculated based on data at said location from 1991 to 2020.) extremes 1898–present (Note: Official records for Fort Worth were kept from September 1898 to 1 April 1940 and at various airports from April 2 1940 to 13 August 1974 before being relocated to the current site at Dallas-Fort Worth Airport from 14 August 1974 to present.)
Month	Jan	Feb	Mar	Apr	May	Jun	Jul	Aug	Sep	Oct	Nov	Dec	Year
Record high °F (°C)	93 (34)	96 (36)	100 (38)	101 (38)	107 (42)	113 (45)	110 (43)	112 (44)	111 (44)	106 (41)	94 (34)	90 (32)	113 (45)
Mean maximum °F (°C)	76.8 (24.9)	80.5 (26.9)	86.2 (30.1)	88.9 (31.6)	94.9 (34.9)	98.6 (37.0)	103.0 (39.4)	103.9 (39.9)	98.8 (37.1)	92.6 (33.7)	83.1 (28.4)	78.0 (25.6)	105.0 (40.6)
Mean daily maximum °F (°C)	56.5 (13.6)	60.9 (16.1)	68.6 (20.3)	76.1 (24.5)	83.6 (28.7)	91.5 (33.1)	95.6 (35.3)	95.8 (35.4)	88.6 (31.4)	78.4 (25.8)	66.6 (19.2)	57.9 (14.4)	76.7 (24.8)
Daily mean °F (°C)	46.3 (7.9)	50.5 (10.3)	58.2 (14.6)	65.6 (18.7)	74.0 (23.3)	81.9 (27.7)	85.7 (29.8)	85.7 (29.8)	78.5 (25.8)	67.7 (19.8)	56.4 (13.6)	48.1 (8.9)	66.6 (19.2)
Mean daily minimum °F (°C)	36.1 (2.3)	40.1 (4.5)	47.8 (8.8)	55.2 (12.9)	64.5 (18.1)	72.2 (22.3)	75.8 (24.3)	75.7 (24.3)	68.5 (20.3)	57.1 (13.9)	46.2 (7.9)	38.3 (3.5)	56.5 (13.6)
Mean minimum °F (°C)	20.9 (−6.2)	24.9 (−3.9)	29.7 (−1.3)	39.7 (4.3)	50.6 (10.3)	63.2 (17.3)	69.8 (21.0)	69.5 (20.8)	55.5 (13.1)	41.2 (5.1)	29.3 (−1.5)	23.5 (−4.7)	17.6 (−8.0)
Record low °F (°C)	−2 (−19)	−8 (−22)	10 (−12)	29 (−2)	34 (1)	48 (9)	56 (13)	55 (13)	40 (4)	24 (−4)	19 (−7)	−1 (−18)	−8 (−22)
Average precipitation inches (mm)	2.53 (64)	2.76 (70)	3.30 (84)	3.22 (82)	4.78 (121)	3.70 (94)	2.08 (53)	2.18 (55)	2.72 (69)	4.37 (111)	2.53 (64)	2.84 (72)	37.01 (940)
Average snowfall inches (cm)	0.1 (0.25)	1.0 (2.5)	0.3 (0.76)	0.0 (0.0)	0.0 (0.0)	0.0 (0.0)	0.0 (0.0)	0.0 (0.0)	0.0 (0.0)	0.0 (0.0)	0.0 (0.0)	0.2 (0.51)	1.6 (4.1)
Average precipitation days (≥ 0.01 in)	7.0	6.9	8.1	7.3	9.4	7.3	4.9	5.1	5.6	7.2	6.5	6.9	82.2
Average snowy days (≥ 0.1 in)	0.4	0.5	0.2	0.0	0.0	0.0	0.0	0.0	0.0	0.0	0.1	0.3	1.5
Average relative humidity (%)	67.5	66.4	63.7	65.3	69.7	65.8	60.0	60.5	66.5	65.7	67.4	67.5	65.4
Average dew point °F (°C)	31.3 (−0.4)	35.2 (1.8)	42.6 (5.9)	52.0 (11.1)	61.0 (16.1)	66.6 (19.2)	67.6 (19.8)	66.7 (19.3)	63.3 (17.4)	53.2 (11.8)	43.7 (6.5)	34.7 (1.5)	51.5 (10.8)
Mean monthly sunshine hours	183.5	178.3	227.7	236.0	258.4	297.8	332.4	304.5	246.2	228.1	183.8	173.0	2,849.7
Percentage possible sunshine	58	58	61	61	60	69	76	74	66	65	59	56	64
Average ultraviolet index	3	5	7	9	10	10	10	10	8	6	4	3	7
Source: NOAA (sun, relative humidity, and dew point 1961–1990 at DFW Airport) (Note: Sunshine normals are based on only 24 years of data.)

==== Urban wildlife ====
Fort Worth’s warm climate and mix of urban and natural spaces support a wide range of native wildlife, including raccoons, squirrels, skunks, armadillos, and opossums. As residential development expands near creeks and wooded areas, residents increasingly encounter these species around homes and neighborhoods. City and state agencies encourage humane prevention and exclusion practices to minimize property damage and reduce human–wildlife conflict.

== Demographics ==
Historical population
Census	Pop.	Note	%±
1880	6,663		—
1890	23,076		246.3%
1900	26,668		15.6%
1910	73,312		174.9%
1920	106,482		45.2%
1930	163,447		53.5%
1940	177,662		8.7%
1950	278,778		56.9%
1960	356,268		27.8%
1970	393,476		10.4%
1980	385,164		−2.1%
1990	447,619		16.2%
2000	534,697		19.5%
2010	741,206		38.6%
2020	918,915		24.0%
2025 (est.)	1,028,117	▲	11.9%
U.S. Decennial Census; 2010–2020

Fort Worth is the most populous city in Tarrant County, and second-most populous community within the Dallas–Fort Worth metroplex. Its metropolitan statistical area encompasses one-quarter of the population of Texas, and is the largest in the Southern U.S. and Texas followed by the Houston–The Woodlands–Sugar Land metropolitan area. At the American Community Survey's 2018 census estimates, the city of Fort Worth had a population near 900,000 residents. In 2019, it grew to an estimated 909,585. At the 2020 United States census, Fort Worth had a population of 918,915 and 2022 census estimates numbered approximately 956,709 residents.

There were 337,072 housing units, 308,188 households, and 208,389 families at the 2018 census estimates. The average household size was 2.87 persons per household, and the average family size was 3.50. Fort Worth had an owner-occupied housing rate of 56.4% and renter-occupied housing rate of 43.6%. The median income in 2018 was $58,448 and the mean income was $81,165. The city had a per capita income of $29,010. Roughly 15.6% of Fort Worthers lived at or below the poverty line.

In 2010's American Community Survey census estimates there were 291,676 housing units, 261,042 households, and 174,909 families. Fort Worth had an average household size of 2.78 and the average family size was 3.47. A total of 92,952 households had children under 18 years living with them. There were 5.9% opposite sex unmarried-partner households and 0.5% same sex unmarried-partner households in 2010. The owner-occupied housing rate of Fort Worth was 59.0% and the renter-occupied housing rate was 41.0%. Fort Worth's median household income was $48,224 and the mean was $63,065. An estimated 21.4% of the population lived at or below the poverty line.

=== Race and ethnicity ===
Racial and ethnic composition	2020	2010	1990	1970	1940
White (non-Hispanic)	36.6%	41.7%	56.5%	72.0% (Note: From 15% sample)	n/a
Hispanic or Latino	34.8%	34.1%	19.5%	7.9%	n/a
Black or African American	19.2%	18.9%	22.0%	19.9%	14.2%
Asian	5.1%	3.7%	2.0%	0.1%	-

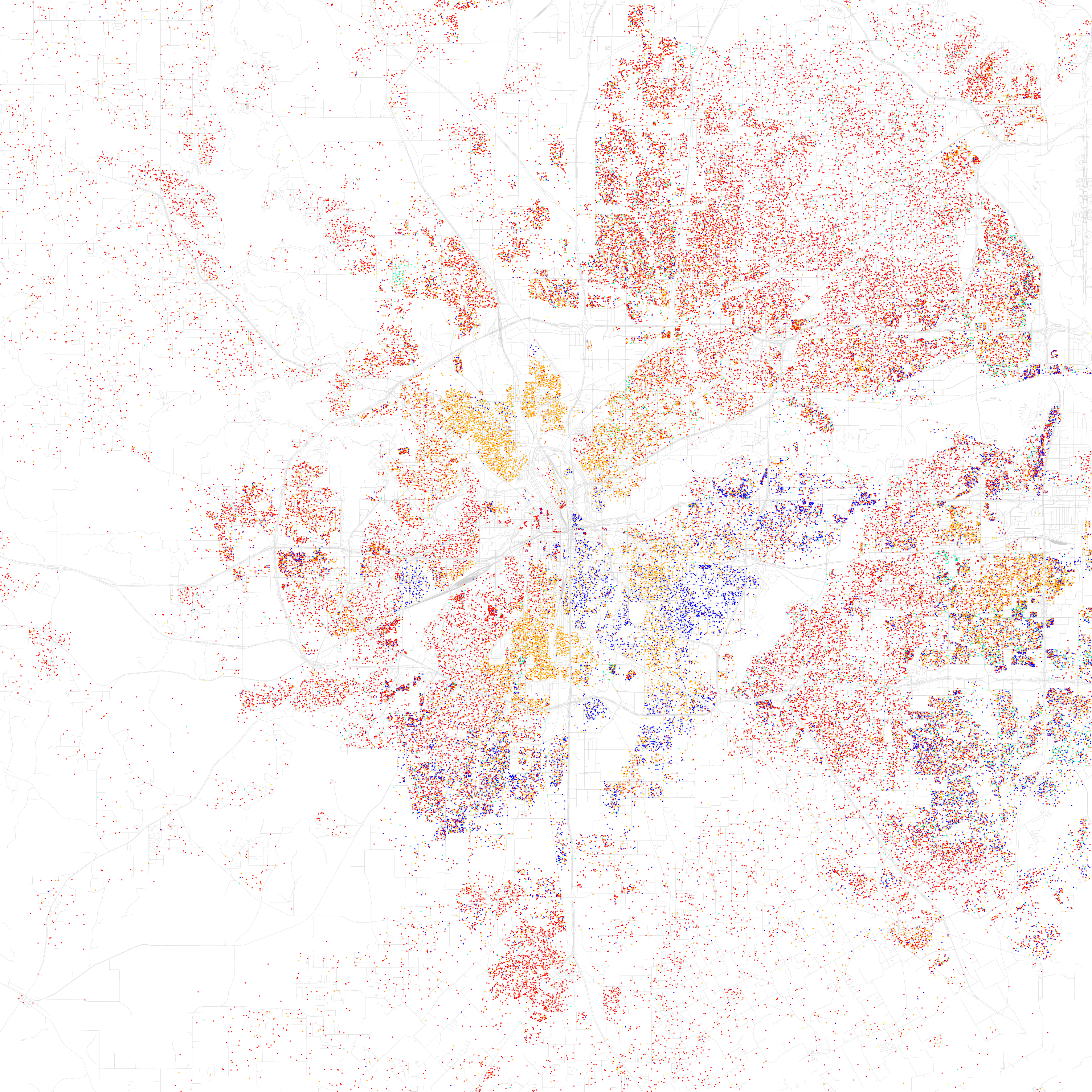
Map of racial distribution in Fort Worth, 2010 U.S. census. Each dot is 25 people: ⬤ White ⬤ Black ⬤ Asian ⬤ Hispanic ⬤ Other

At the 2010 U.S. census, the racial composition of Fort Worth's population was 61.1% White (non-Hispanic whites: 41.7%), 18.9% Black or African American, 0.6% Native American, 3.7% Asian American, 0.1% Native Hawaiian and other Pacific Islander, 34.1% Hispanic or Latino (of any race), and 3.1% of two or more races. In 2018, 38.2% of Fort Worth was non-Hispanic white, 18.6% Black or African American, 0.4% American Indian or Alaska Native, 4.8% Asian American, 0.1% Pacific Islander, 2.1% from two or more races, and 35.5% Hispanic or Latino (of any race), marking an era of diversification in the city limits.

A study determined Fort Worth as one of the most diverse cities in the United States in 2019. For contrast, in 1970, the U.S. Census Bureau reported Fort Worth's population as 72% non-Hispanic white, 19.9% African American, and 7.9% Hispanic or Latino. By the 2020 census, continued population growth spurred further diversification with 36.6% of the population being non-Hispanic white, 34.8% Hispanic or Latino American of any race, and 19.2% Black or African American; Asian Americans increased to forming 5.1% of the population, reflecting nationwide demographic trends at the time. In 2020, a total of 31,485 residents were of two or more races.

=== Religion ===
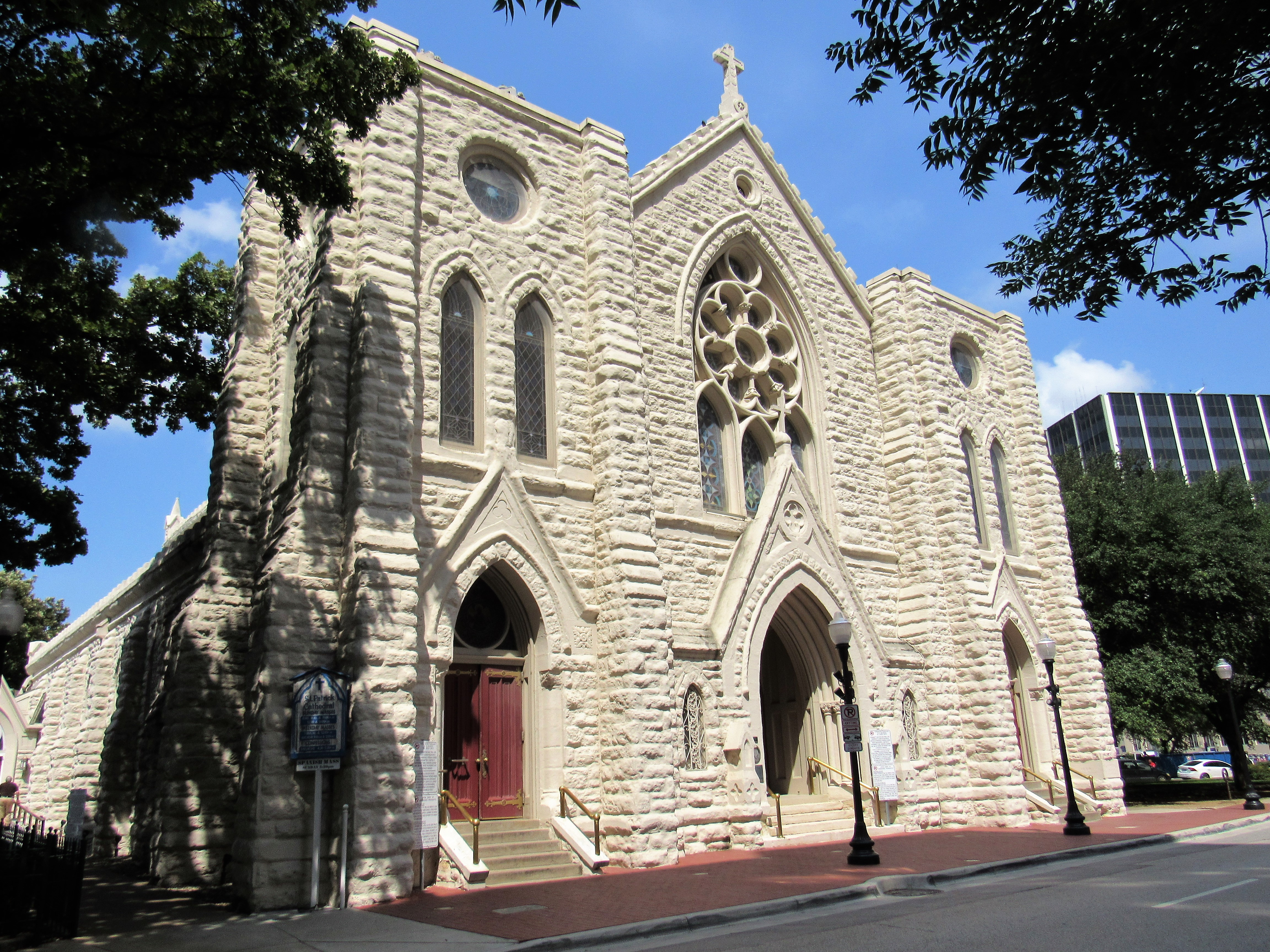
St. Patrick Cathedral, see of the Roman Catholic Diocese of Fort Worth

Fort Worth and the Dallas-Fort Worth Metroplex, located within the Bible Belt, are predominantly Christian. Fort Worth and Tarrant County are predominantly Protestant while Roman Catholicism forms the largest single denomination.

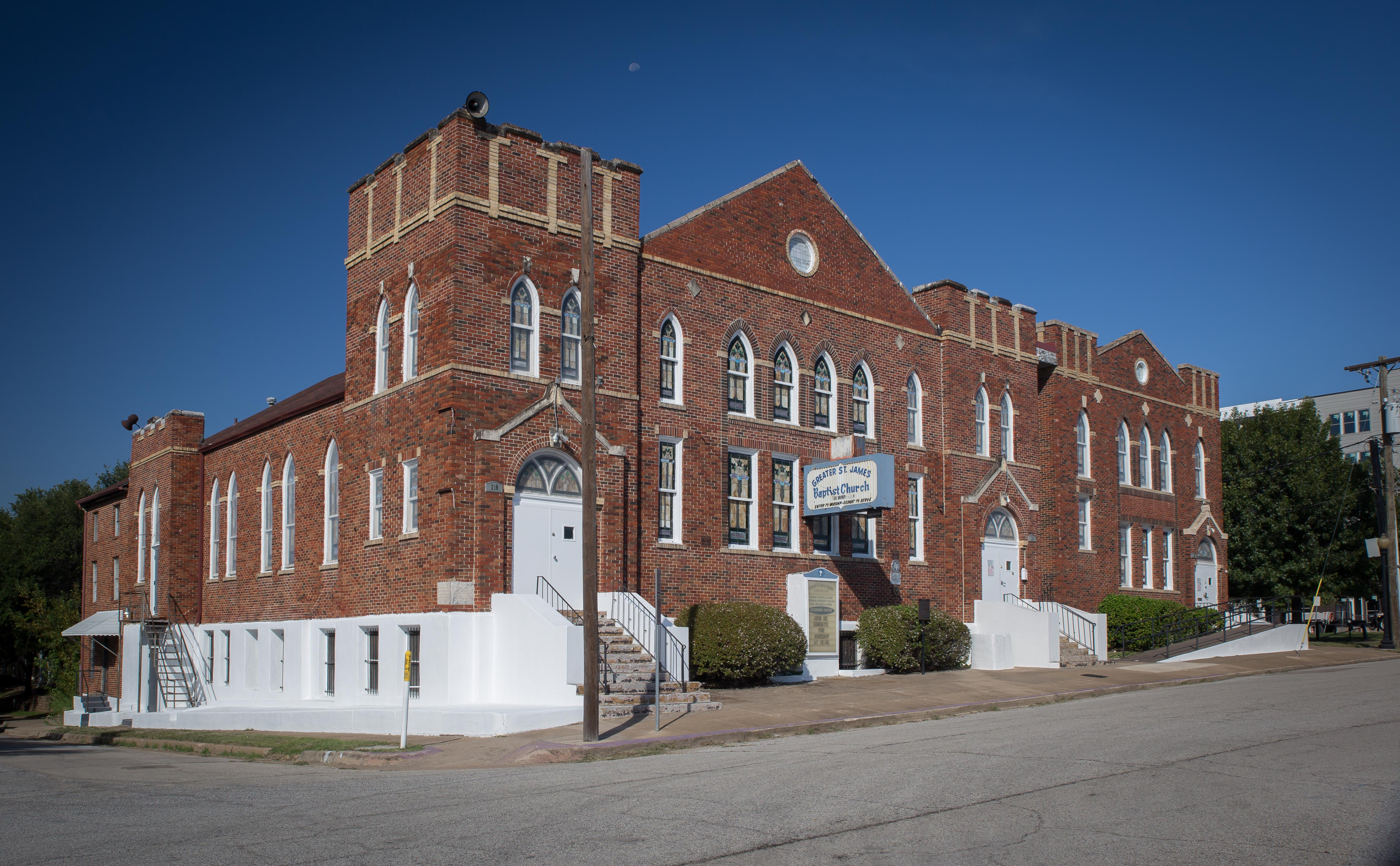
Saint James Second Street Baptist Church, a historic predominantly African American Baptist church

The oldest continuously operating church in Fort Worth is First Christian Church, founded in 1855. Other historical churches continuing operation in the city include St. Patrick Cathedral (founded 1888), Saint James Second Street Baptist Church (founded 1895), Tabernacle Baptist Church (built 1923), St. Mary of the Assumption Church (built 1924), Our Mother of Mercy Catholic Church and Parsonage (built 1929 and 1911), and Morning Chapel C.M.E. Church (built 1934).

With a predominant Protestant population, Southern Baptists are the largest protestant group, and second-largest Christian denomination for Fort Worth's metropolitan division in 2020, with 347,771 adherents. Southern Baptists have been divided between the more traditionalist and conservative Southern Baptists of Texas Convention, and the theologically moderate Baptist General Convention of Texas; according to the Baptist General Convention of Texas, there are 167 churches within the vicinity of Fort Worth proper as of 2023. The Southern Baptists of Texas Convention listed 117 churches in 2023. Other prominent Baptist denominations such as the National Missionary Baptist Convention, National Baptist Convention, National Baptist Convention of America, Full Gospel Baptist Church Fellowship, American Baptist Association, and the National Association of Free Will Baptists collectively numbered 51,261 at the 2020 study.

Non-denominational Christianity forms Fort Worth's third-largest Christian group. Having more than 289,554 adherents. Methodists were the fourth-largest Christian group with more than 100,000 adherents of the United Methodist Church spread throughout Fort Worth's metropolitan division. The African Methodist Episcopal Church, Christian Methodist Episcopal Church, African Methodist Episcopal Zion Church, and Free Methodist Church also formed a substantial portion of the area's Methodist population. Pentecostals, descended from the Wesleyan-Holiness movement of Methodists, formed the fifth-largest Christian constituency and primarily divided between the Assemblies of God USA and Church of God in Christ.

According to the Association of Religion Data Archives in 2020, Tarrant County's Catholic community numbered 359,705, and was the Fort Worth metropolitan division's single largest Christian denomination or tradition with 378,490 adherents. Among other Christian bodies embodying catholicity, the Association of Religion Data Archives reported the Coptic Orthodox Church was the largest Eastern Christian group, followed by the Greek Orthodox Archdiocese of America and Orthodox Church in America, the Antiochian Orthodox Christian Archdiocese of North America, and Eritrean Orthodox Tewahedo Church numbering 6,216 altogether.

Among Fort Worther's non-Christian community, Islam and Judaism were the second- and third-largest religious communities. According to the Association of Religion Data Archives, there were an estimated 37,488 Muslims and 2,413 Jews living in Fort Worth's vicinity, although the Goldring/Woldenberg Institute of Southern Jewish Life estimated 5,000 Jews in 2010. Religions including Hinduism and Baha'i had a minuscule presence in the Fort Worth area according to the 2020 study, and Christendom remained more prevalent than in the Dallas metropolitan division.

== Economy ==
At its inception, Fort Worth relied on cattle drives that traveled the Chisholm Trail. Millions of cattle were driven north to market along this trail, and Fort Worth became the center of cattle drives, and later, ranching until the American Civil War. During the American Civil War, Fort Worth suffered shortages causing its population to decline. It recovered during the Reconstruction with general stores, banks, and "Hell's Half-Acre", a large collection of saloons and dance halls which increased business and criminal activity in the city. By the early 20th century the military used martial law to regulate Hell's Half-Acre's bartenders and prostitutes.

Since the late 20th century several major companies have been headquartered in Fort Worth. These include American Airlines Group (and subsidiaries American Airlines and Envoy Air), Pier 1 Imports, Chip 1 Exchange, RadioShack, Pioneer Corporation, Cash America International, GM Financial, Budget Host, the BNSF Railway, and Bell Textron. Companies with a significant presence in the city are Bank of America, Wells Fargo, Lockheed Martin, GE Transportation, and Dallas-based telecommunications company AT&T. Metro by T-Mobile is also prominent in the city.

== Culture ==
American Airlines DC-3 NC21798 "Flagship Knoxville" on permanent display at the CR Smith Museum

Fort Worth promotes itself as the "City of Cowboys and Culture" drawing on its history of Frontier Western Heritage and local arts patronage. The city hosts an indoor rodeo, and features various museums, festivals and local arts programs. The Academy of Western Artists, based in Gene Autry, Oklahoma, presents its annual awards in Fort Worth in fields related to the American cowboy, including music, literature, and chuck wagon cooking.

Fort Worth is also the 1931 birthplace of the official state music of Texas—Western swing, which was created by Bob Wills and Milton Brown and their Light Crust Doughboys band in a ramshackle dance hall 4 miles west of downtown at the Crystal Springs Dance Pavilion.

=== Arts and sciences ===
Theatre

- Amphibian Stage Productions
- Bass Performance Hall
- Casa Mañana
- Circle Theatre
- Jubilee Theater
- Kids Who Care Inc.
- Stage West

Music

- Billy Bob's
- Fort Worth Opera
- Fort Worth Symphony Orchestra
- Live Eclectic Music (Ridglea Theater)
- Texas Ballet Theater
- Van Cliburn International Piano Competition

Museums

- Al and Ann Stohlman Museum
- American Airline C.R. Smith Museum
- Amon Carter Museum of American Art
- Fort Worth Museum of Science and History
- Fort Worth Stockyards Museum
- John Wayne: An American Experience
- Kimbell Art Museum
- Lenora Rolla Heritage Center Museum
- Log Cabin Village
- Military Museum of Fort Worth
- Modern Art Museum of Fort Worth
- National Cowgirl Museum and Hall of Fame
- National Multicultural Western Heritage Museum
- Sid Richardson Museum
- Texas Civil War Museum
- Texas Cowboy Hall of Fame

=== Nature ===
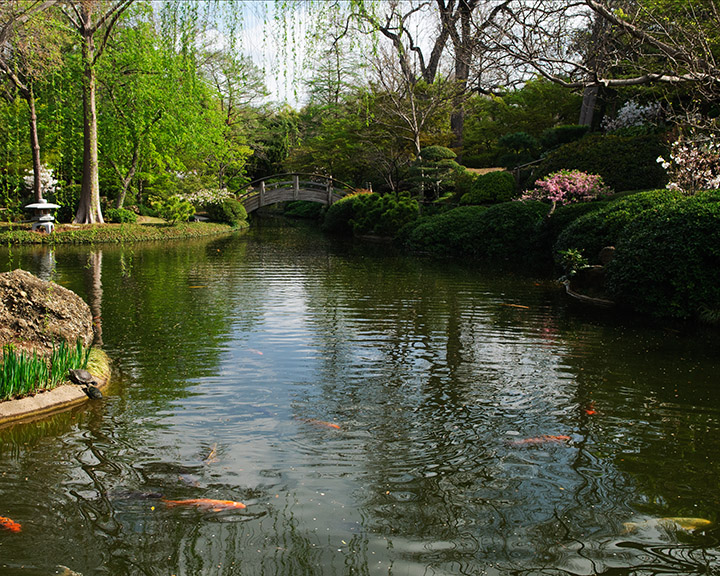
The Japanese Gardens at the Fort Worth Botanic Garden, 2011

The Fort Worth Zoo is home to over 7,000 animals.

The Fort Worth Botanic Garden and the Botanical Research Institute of Texas are also in the city. For those interested in hiking, birding, or canoeing, the Fort Worth Nature Center and Refuge in northwest Fort Worth is a 3,621-acre preserved natural area designated by the Department of the Interior as a National Natural Landmark Site in 1980. Established in 1964 as the Greer Island Nature Center and Refuge, it celebrated its 50th anniversary in 2014. The Nature Center has a small, genetically pure bison herd, and native prairies, forests, and wetlands. It is one of the largest urban parks of its type in the United States.

=== Parks ===
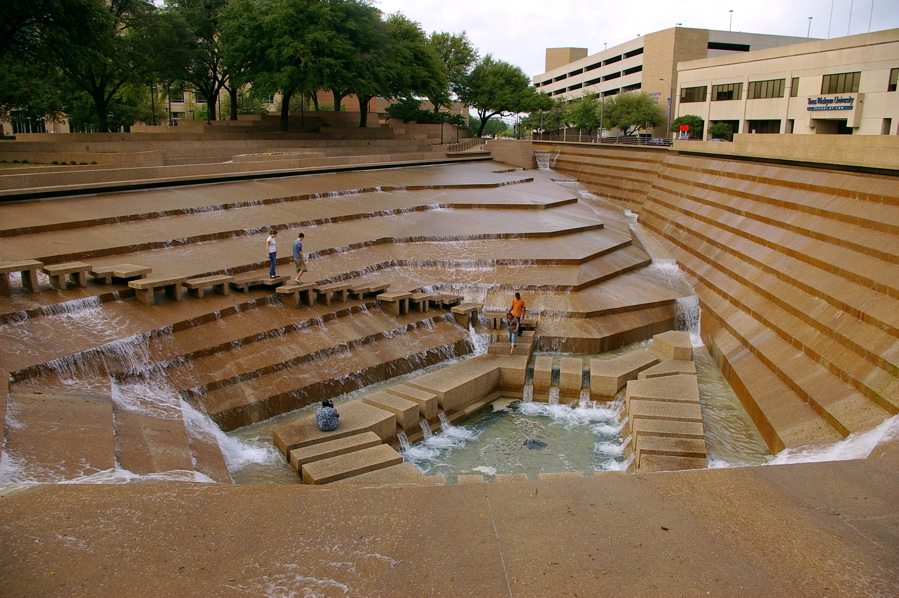
The Fort Worth Water Gardens

Fort Worth has a total of 263 parks with 179 of those being neighborhood parks. The total acres of parkland is 11,700.72 acres with the average being about 12.13 acres per park.

The 4.3 acre (1.7 hectare) Fort Worth Water Gardens, designed by noted New York architects Philip Johnson and John Burgee, is an urban park containing three pools of water and terraced knolls; the Water Gardens are billed as a "cooling oasis in the concrete jungle" of downtown. Heritage Park Plaza is a Modernist-style park that was designed by Lawrence Halprin. The plaza design incorporates a set of interconnecting rooms constructed of concrete and activated throughout by flowing water walls, channels, and pools and was added to the US National Register of Historic Places on May 10, 2010.

There are two off-leash dog parks located in the city, ZBonz Dog Park and Fort Woof. The park includes an agility course, water fountains, shaded shelters, and waste stations.

== Sports ==
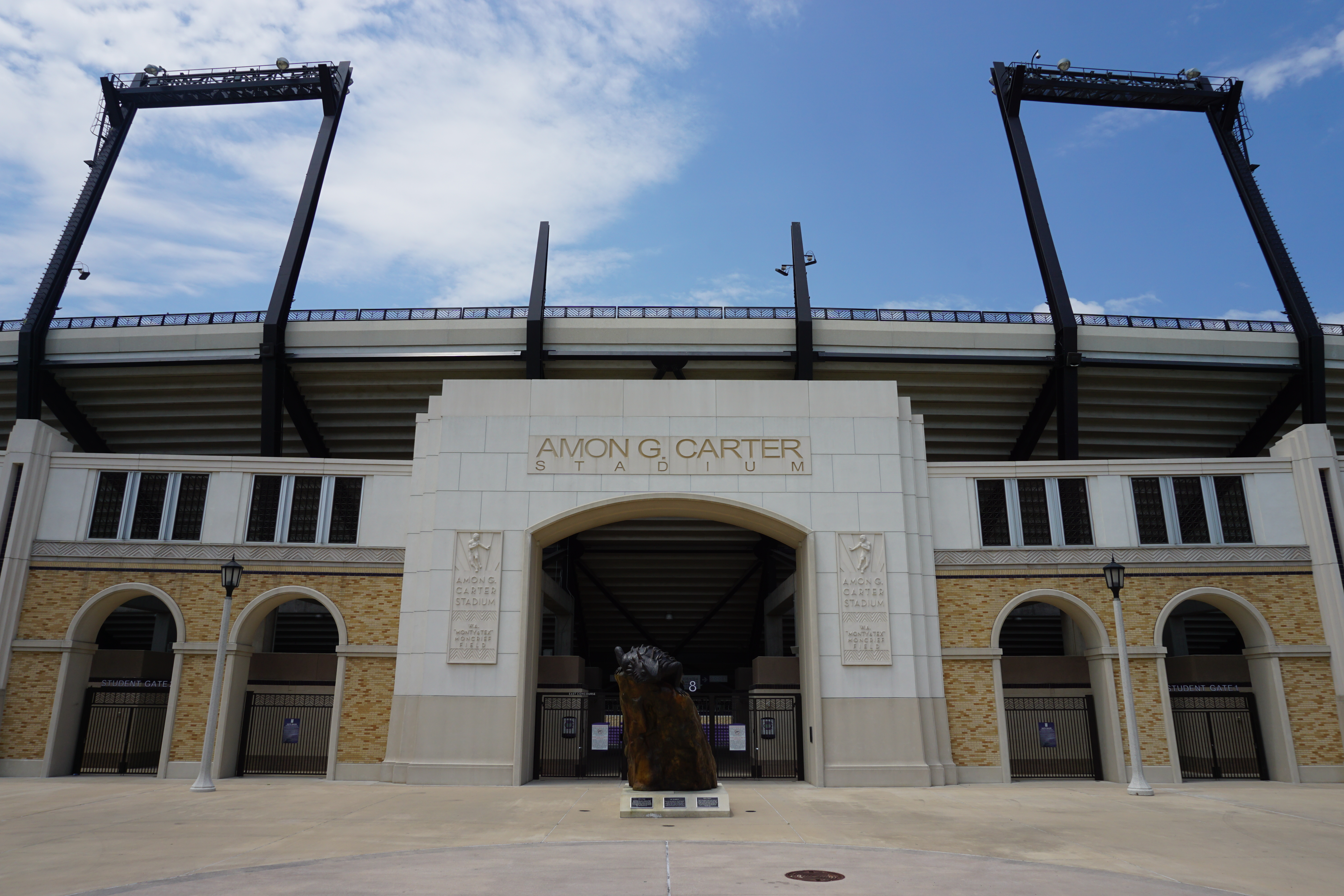
Amon G. Carter Stadium of the TCU Horned Frogs

While much of Fort Worth's sports attention is focused on Dallas's professional sports teams, the city has its own athletic identity.

In 2021, it was announced that Austin Bold FC would relocate to Fort Worth, providing Fort Worth with a USL Championship club. Semi-professionally, the Fort Worth Jaguars play in the North American Floorball League and the North Texas Bulls of the National Arena League play at Cowtown Coliseum.

There are three amateur soccer clubs in Fort Worth: Fort Worth Vaqueros FC, Inocentes FC, and Azul City Premier FC; Inocentes and Azul City Premier both play in the United Premier Soccer League. The Vaqueros play in the National Premier Soccer League.

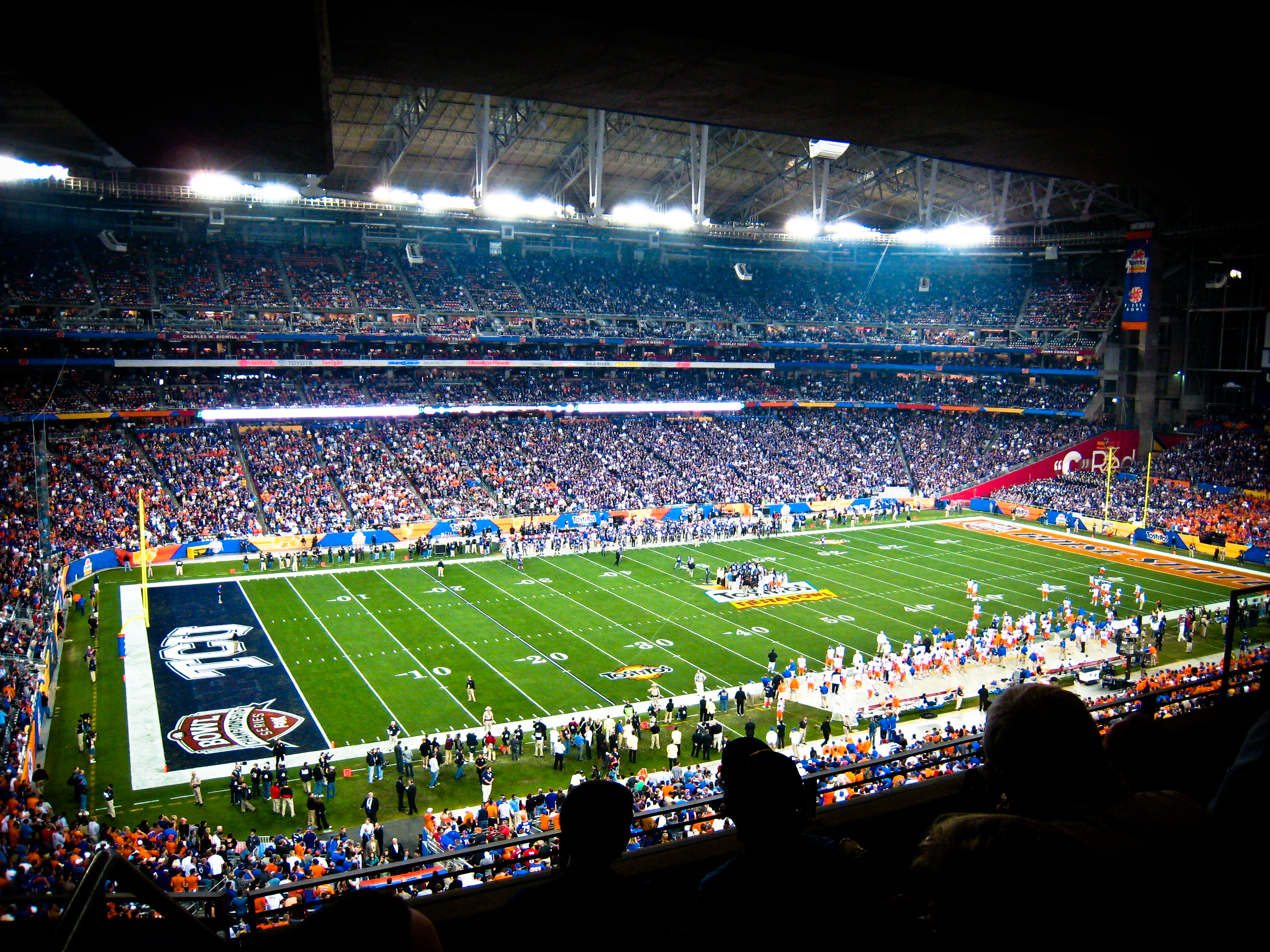
The 2010 Fiesta Bowl with Boise State against TCU

Collegiately, Texas Christian University's athletic teams are the premier college sports teams for Fort Worth. The TCU Horned Frogs compete in NCAA Division I athletics. The Horned Frog football team produced two national championships in the 1930s and remained a strong competitor in the Southwest Conference into the 1960s before beginning a long period of underperformance.

The revival of the TCU football program began under Dennis Franchione with the success of running back LaDainian Tomlinson. Under Gary Patterson, the Horned Frogs have developed into a perennial top-10 contender, and a Rose Bowl winner in 2011. Notable players include Sammy Baugh, Davey O'Brien, Bob Lilly, LaDainian Tomlinson, Jerry Hughes, and Andy Dalton. The Horned Frogs, along with their rivals and fellow non-AQ leaders the Boise State Broncos and University of Utah Utes, were deemed the quintessential "BCS Busters", having appeared in both the Fiesta and Rose bowls. Their "BCS Buster" role ended in 2012 when they joined the Big 12 athletic conference in all sports.

Nearby Texas Wesleyan University competes in the NAIA, and won the 2006 NAIA Div. I Men's Basketball Championship and three-time National Collegiate Table Tennis Association (NCTTA) team championships (2004–2006). Fort Worth is also home to the NCAA football Lockheed Martin Armed Forces Bowl.

There used to be one professional sports team in Fort Worth proper, Panther City Lacrosse Club of the National Lacrosse League. It was founded in 2020 and played at Dickies Arena until it folded in 2024.

=== Recreation ===
==== Colonial National Invitational Golf Tournament ====
Fort Worth hosts an important professional men's golf tournament every May at the Colonial Country Club. The Colonial Invitational Golf Tournament, titled for sponsorship reasons as the Charles Schwab Challenge since 2019, is one of the more prestigious and historical events of the tour calendar. The Colonial Country Club was the home course of golfing legend Ben Hogan, who was from Fort Worth.

==== Motor racing ====
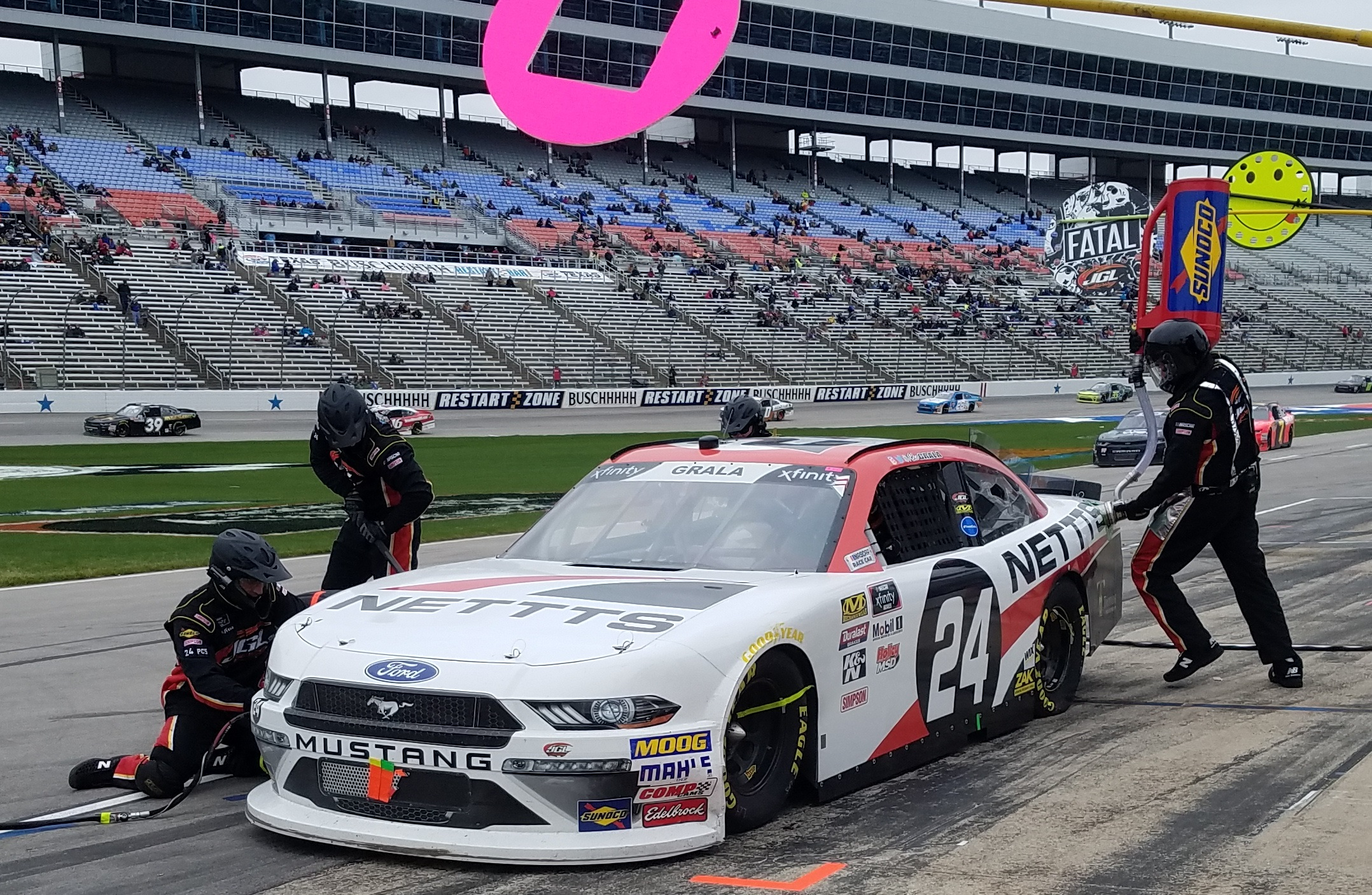
Kaz Grala pitting at Texas Motor Speedway, 2018

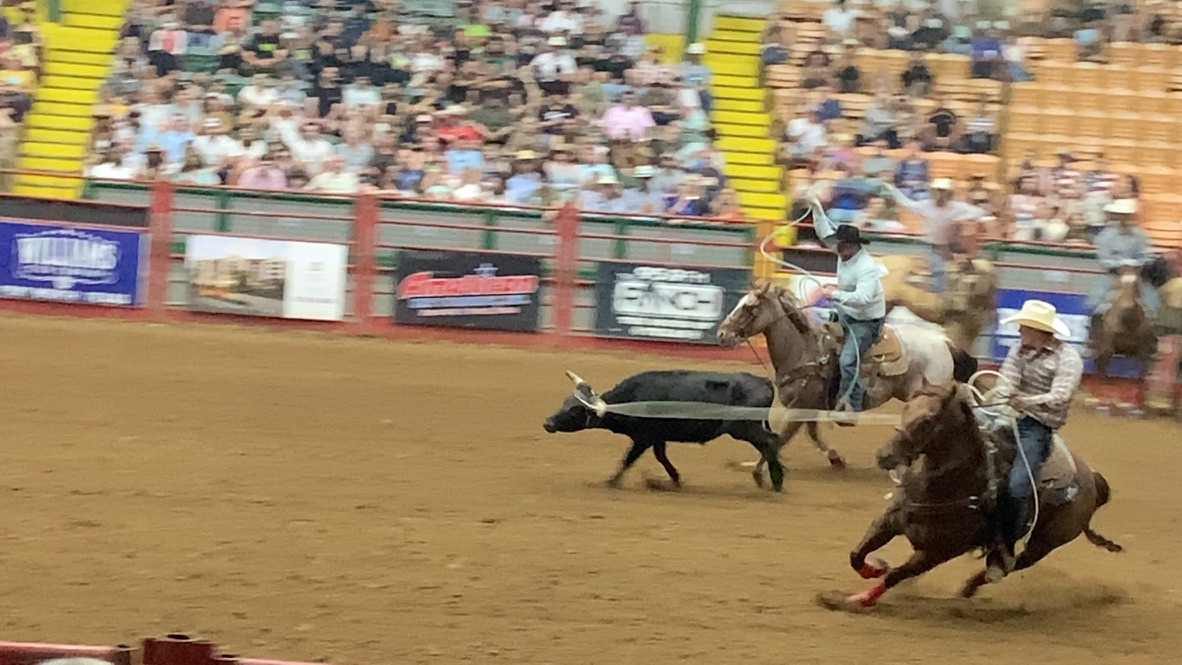
Team calf-roping at a rodeo located in Fort Worth at the Stockyards

Fort Worth is home to Texas Motor Speedway, also known as "The Great American Speedway". Texas Motor Speedway is a 1.5-mile quad-oval track located in the far northern part of the city in Denton County. The speedway opened in 1997, and as of 2026, hosts a race each of the NASCAR Cup Series, NASCAR O'Reilly Auto Parts Series, and the NASCAR Craftsman Truck Series. The speedway also held IndyCar Series between 1997 and 2023.

Amateur sports-car racing in the greater Fort Worth area occurs mostly at two purpose-built tracks: MotorSport Ranch and Eagles Canyon Raceway. Sanctioning bodies include the Porsche Club of America, the National Auto Sports Association, and the Sports Car Club of America.

==== Cowtown Marathon ====
The annual Cowtown Marathon has been held every last weekend in February since 1978. The two-day activities include two 5Ks, a 10K, the half marathon, marathon, and ultra marathon.

==== Rodeo ====
In addition to the weekly rodeos held at Cowtown Coliseum in the Stockyards, the Fort Worth Stock Show and Rodeo is held within the Will Rogers Memorial Center at the Ariat Arena. Ariat Arena also hosts a few TCU basketball games and in the future planned to host college basketball tournaments at the conference and national levels.

== Government ==
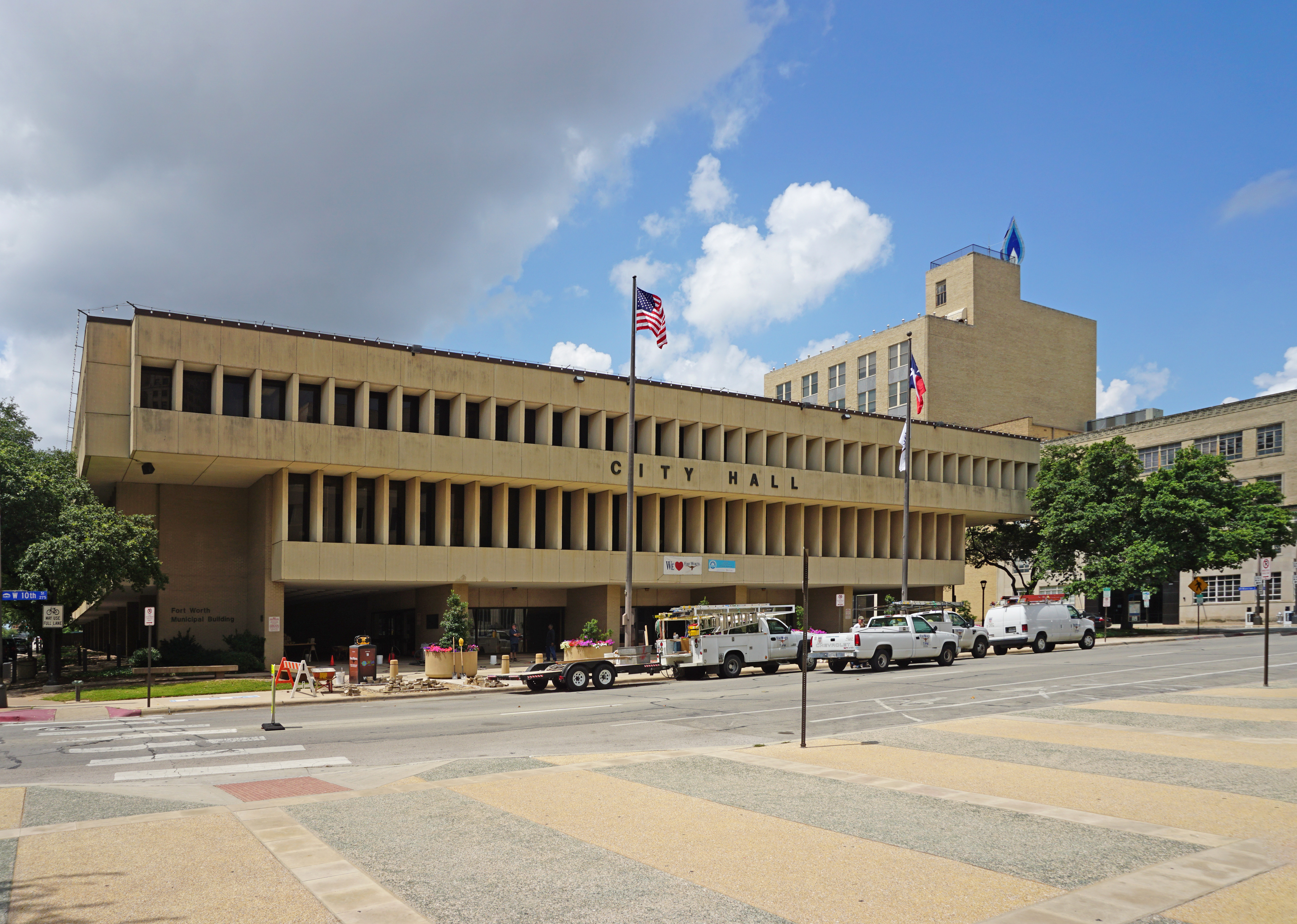
City Hall in Fort Worth

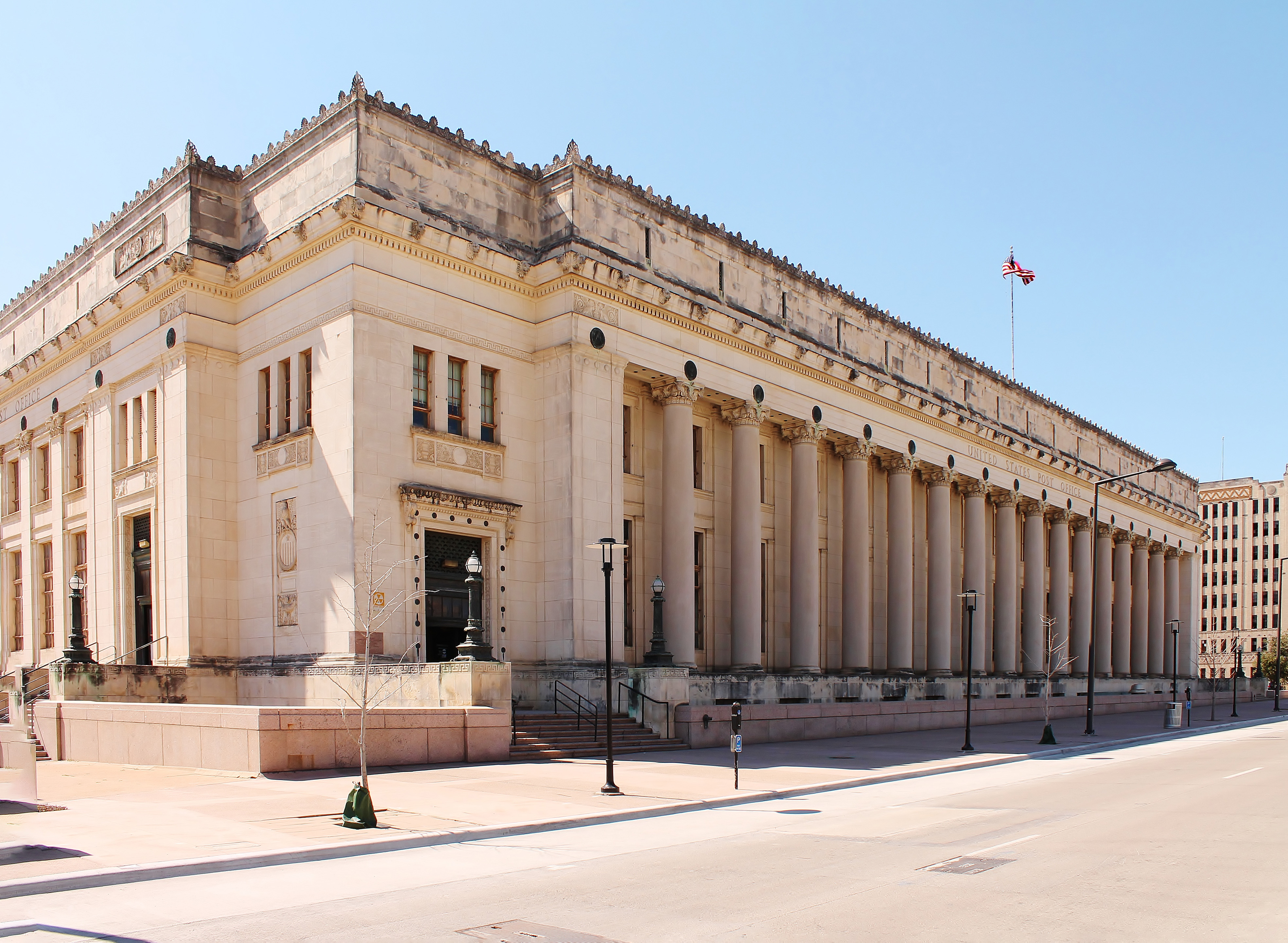
Downtown U.S. post office in Fort Worth

=== City government ===
Fort Worth has a council-manager government, with elections held every two years for a mayor, elected at large, and eight council members, elected by district. The mayor is a voting member of the council and represents the city on ceremonial occasions. The council has the power to adopt municipal ordinances and resolutions, make proclamations, set the city tax rate, approve the city budget, and appoint the city secretary, city attorney, city auditor, municipal court judges, and members of city boards and commissions. The day-to-day operations of city government are overseen by the city manager, who is also appointed by the council. The current mayor is Republican Mattie Parker, making Fort Worth the second-largest city in the United States with a Republican mayor.

==== City departments ====
- Fort Worth Police Department – provides crime prevention, investigation, and other emergency services
- Fort Worth Fire Department – provides fire and emergency services
- Fort Worth Library – public library system of the City of Fort Worth

=== State government ===
==== State Board of Education members ====
District	Name	Party
District 11	Patricia Hardy	Republican
District 13	Erika Beltran	Democratic

==== Texas state representatives ====
District	Name	Party	Residence
District 63	Ben Bumgarner	Republican	Flower Mound
District 90	Ramon Romero Jr.	Democratic	Fort Worth
District 91	David Lowe	Republican	Fort Worth
District 92	Salman Bhojani	Democratic	Bedford
District 93	Nate Schatzline	Republican	Fort Worth
District 95	Nicole Collier	Democratic	Fort Worth
District 96	David Cook	Republican	Mansfield
District 97	John McQueeney	Republican	Fort Worth
District 98	Giovanni Capriglione	Republican	Southlake
District 99	Charlie Geren	Republican	River Oaks

==== Texas state senators ====
District	Name	Party	Residence
District 9	Taylor Rehmet	Democratic	Fort Worth
District 10	Phil King	Republican	Weatherford
District 12	Tan Parker	Republican	Flower Mound
District 30	Brent Hagenbuch	Republican	Denton

==== State facilities ====
The Texas Department of Transportation operates the Fort Worth District Office in Fort Worth.

The North Texas Intermediate Sanction Facility, a privately operated prison facility housing short-term parole violators, was in Fort Worth. It was operated on behalf of the Texas Department of Criminal Justice. In 2011, the state of Texas decided not to renew its contract with the facility.

=== Federal government ===
==== United States House of Representatives ====
District	Name	Party	Residence
Texas's 6th congressional district	Jake Ellzey	Republican	Midlothian
Texas's 12th congressional district	Craig Goldman	Republican	Fort Worth
Texas's 24th congressional district	Beth Van Duyne	Republican	Irving
Texas's 26th congressional district	Brandon Gill	Republican	Flower Mound
Texas's 33rd congressional district	Marc Veasey	Democratic	Fort Worth

==== Federal facilities ====
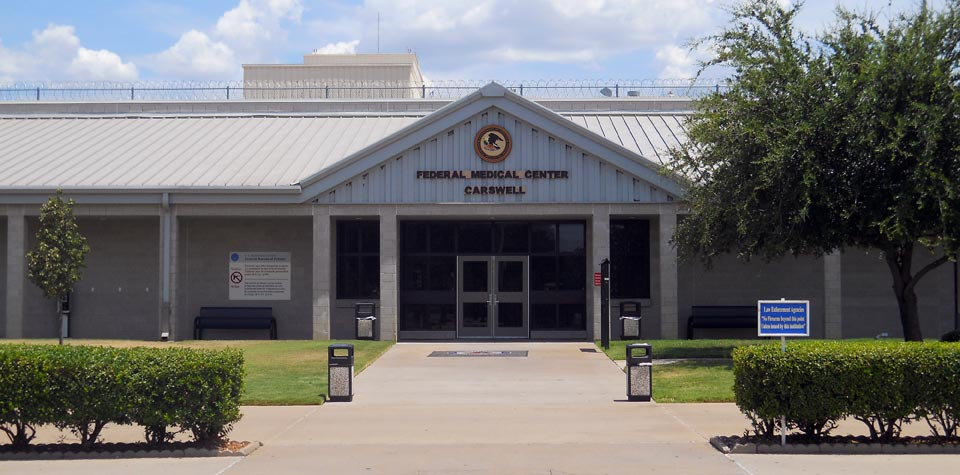
Federal Medical Center, Carswell

Fort Worth is home to one of the two locations of the Bureau of Engraving and Printing. In 1987, construction on this second facility began. In addition to meeting increased production requirements, a western location was seen to serve as a contingency operation in case of emergencies in the Washington, DC, metropolitan area; as well, costs for transporting currency to Federal Reserve banks in San Francisco, Dallas, and Kansas City would be reduced. Currency production began in December 1990 at the Fort Worth facility; the official dedication took place April 26, 1991. Bills produced here have a small "FW" in one corner.

The Eldon B. Mahon United States Courthouse building contains three oil-on-canvas panels on the fourth floor by artist Frank Mechau (commissioned under the Public Works Administration's art program). Mechau's paintings, The Taking of Sam Bass, Two Texas Rangers, and Flags Over Texas were installed in 1940, becoming the only New Deal art commission sponsored in Fort Worth. The courthouse, built in 1933, serves the United States District Court for the Northern District of Texas and was listed in the National Register of Historic Places in 2001.

Federal Medical Center, Carswell, a federal prison and health facility for women, is located in the Naval Air Station Joint Reserve Base Fort Worth. Carswell houses the federal death row for female inmates. Federal Medical Center, Ft. Worth, a federal prison and health facility for men, is located across from TCC-South Campus. The Federal Aviation Administration, National Archives and Records Administration, and Federal Bureau of Investigation have offices in Fort Worth.

=== Politics ===
2024 presidential election in Fort Worth

Since 2012, Tarrant County has shifted about 10 points to the left —even though Mitt Romney won the county that year by 15.8 points. In contrast, the city of Fort Worth has moved only about 2 points left during the same period. This relative stability in Fort Worth’s political leanings is largely due to its substantial Hispanic population. The Republican Party—particularly under Trump—has made significant inroads with Hispanic voters, capturing 55% of the Latino vote statewide in 2024. As Hispanic voters have trended right, white suburbanites in Fort Worth have moved left, effectively balancing the overall margin. Consequently, Fort Worth’s voting dynamics remain roughly similar to 2012, when Romney lost the city by just one point to Barack Obama.

Fort Worth's current mayor is Mattie Parker, who has held the position since 2021. Fort Worth is one of the few major cities in the state to have a Republican mayor. Notably, Fort Worth is the second-largest city—after Dallas—to be governed by a Republican mayor.

Fort Worth presidential election results
Year	Democratic	Republican	Third parties
2024	50.8% 167,820	47.8% 157,774	1.2% 4,575
2020	54.8% 179,457	43.5% 142,297	1.7% 10,238
2016	50.4% 125,603	44.4% 110,595	5.2% 13,049
2012	50.5% 111,445	49.5% 109,062	0.0% 0
2008	52.3% 118,793	47.0% 106,747	0.6% 1,398
2004	46.4% 87,965	53.6% 101,603	0.0% 0
2000	48.7% 75,619	51.3% 79,723	0.0% 0

== Education ==
=== Public libraries ===
Fort Worth Public Library is the public library system.

=== Public schools ===
Most of Fort Worth is served by the Fort Worth Independent School District.

Other school districts that serve portions of Fort Worth include:

- Aledo Independent School District
- Arlington Independent School District (wastewater plant only)
- Azle Independent School District
- Birdville Independent School District
- Burleson Independent School District
- Castleberry Independent School District
- Crowley Independent School District
- Eagle Mountain-Saginaw Independent School District
- Everman Independent School District
- Hurst-Euless-Bedford Independent School District
- Keller Independent School District
- Kennedale Independent School District
- Lake Worth Independent School District
- Northwest Independent School District
- White Settlement Independent School District

The portion of Fort Worth within the Arlington Independent School District contains a wastewater plant. No residential areas are in this portion.

Pinnacle Academy of the Arts (K–12) is a state charter school, as are Crosstimbers Academy and High Point Academy.

=== Private schools ===
Private schools in Fort Worth include both secular and parochial institutions.

- All Saints' Episcopal School (Fort Worth, TX) (PreK–12)
- Bethesda Christian School (K–12)
- Covenant Classical School (K–12)
- Fort Worth Christian School (K–12)
- Fort Worth Country Day School (K–12)
- Lake Country Christian School (K–12)
- Montessori School of Fort Worth (Pre-K–8)
- Nolan Catholic High School (9–12)
- Trinity Valley School (K–12)
- Temple Christian School (Pre-K–12)
- Hill School of Fort Worth (2–12)
- Southwest Christian School (K–12)
- St. Paul Lutheran School (K–8)
- The Roman Catholic Diocese of Fort Worth oversees several Catholic elementary and middle schools.

=== Institutes of higher education ===
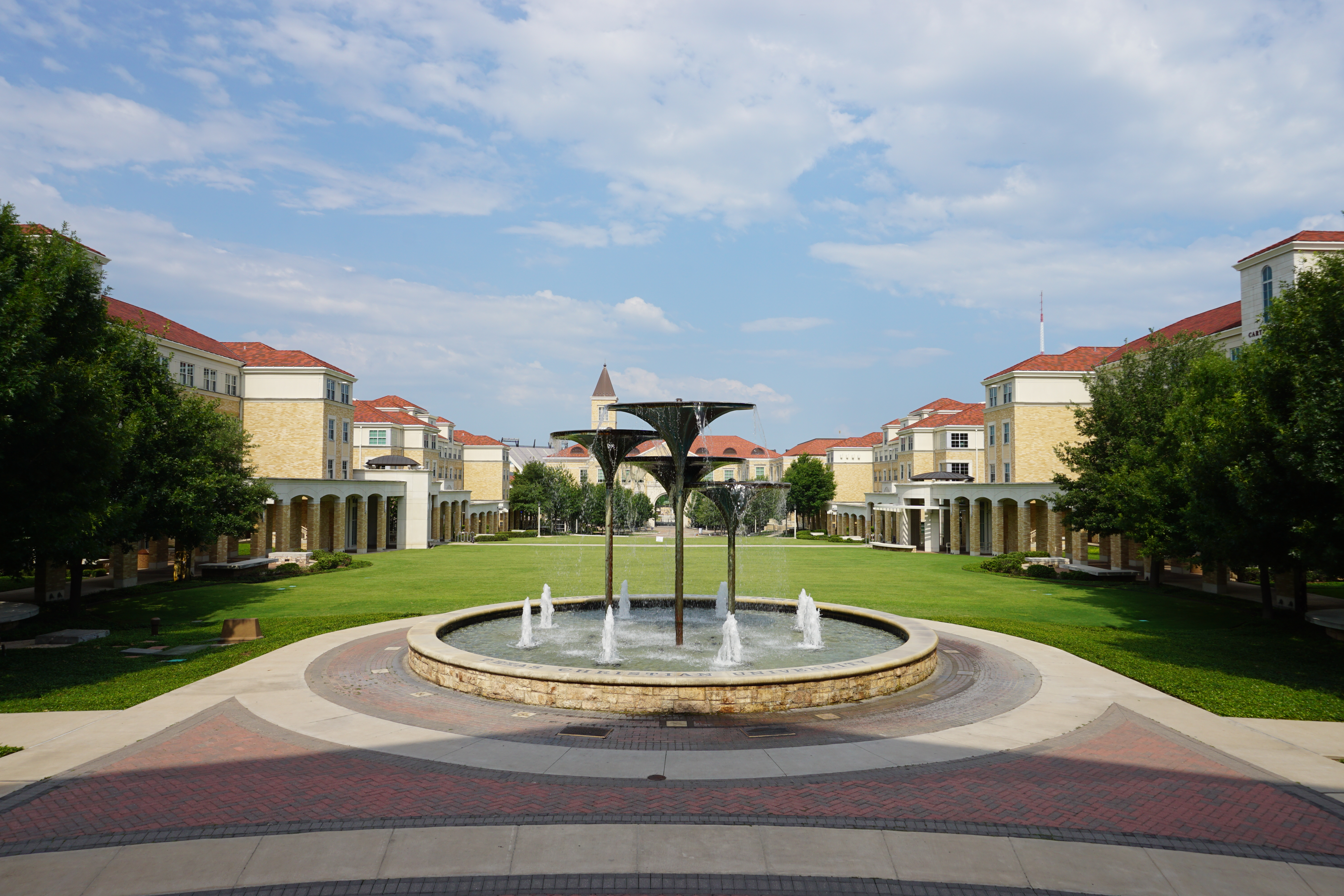
Texas Christian University

- Texas Christian University
- Texas Wesleyan University
- University of Texas at Arlington – Downtown Fort Worth campus
- University of North Texas Health Science Center
- TCU School of Medicine
- Texas A&M University School of Law
- Tarleton State University – Fort Worth campus
- Southwestern Baptist Theological Seminary
- Brite Divinity School
- Tarrant County College

Other institutions:

- The Art Institute of Fort Worth
- Brightwood College – Fort Worth Campus
- Fisher More College
- Remington College Fort Worth campus
- The Culinary School of Fort Worth
- Epic Helicopters Pilot Training Academy

== Media ==
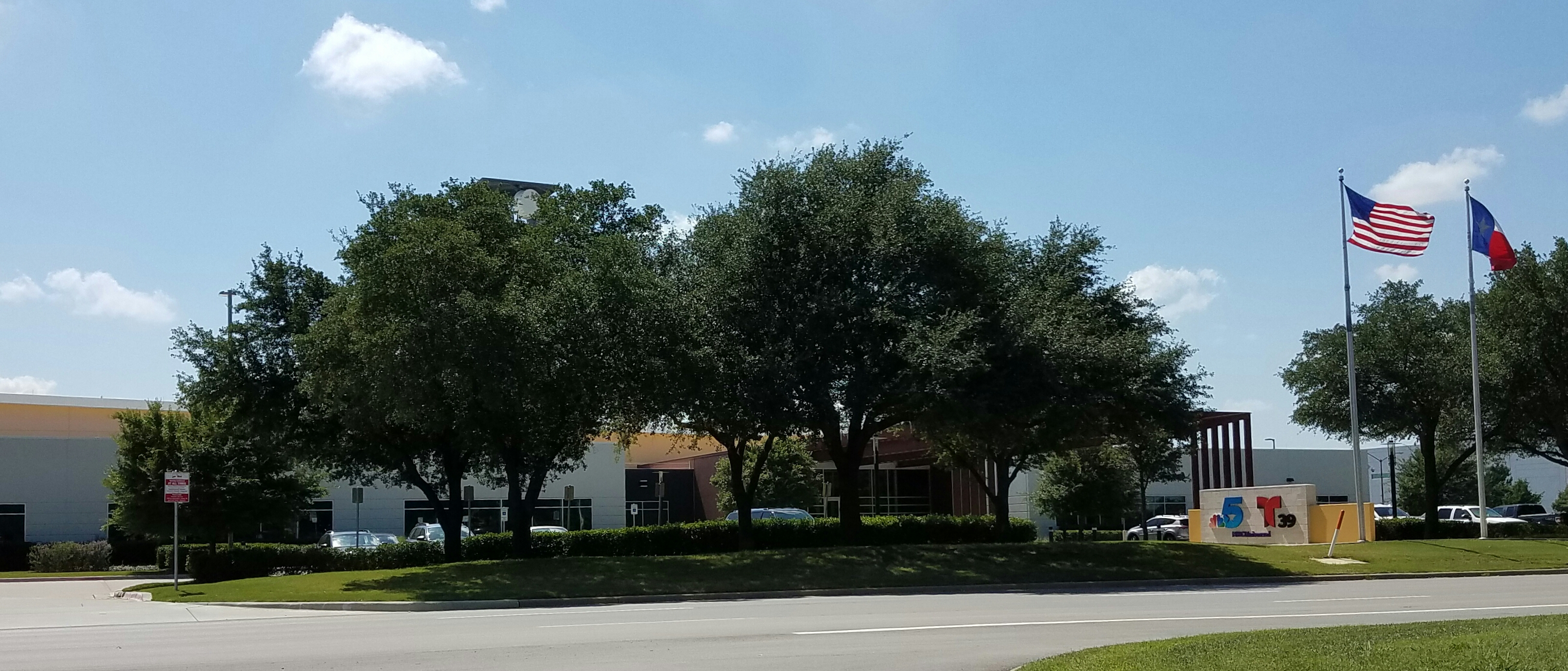
Location of studios and offices for KXAS (as well as KXTX), in Fort Worth, just south of DFW Airport

Fort Worth and Dallas share the same media market. The city's magazine is Fort Worth, Texas Magazine, which publishes information about Fort Worth events, social activity, fashion, dining, and culture.

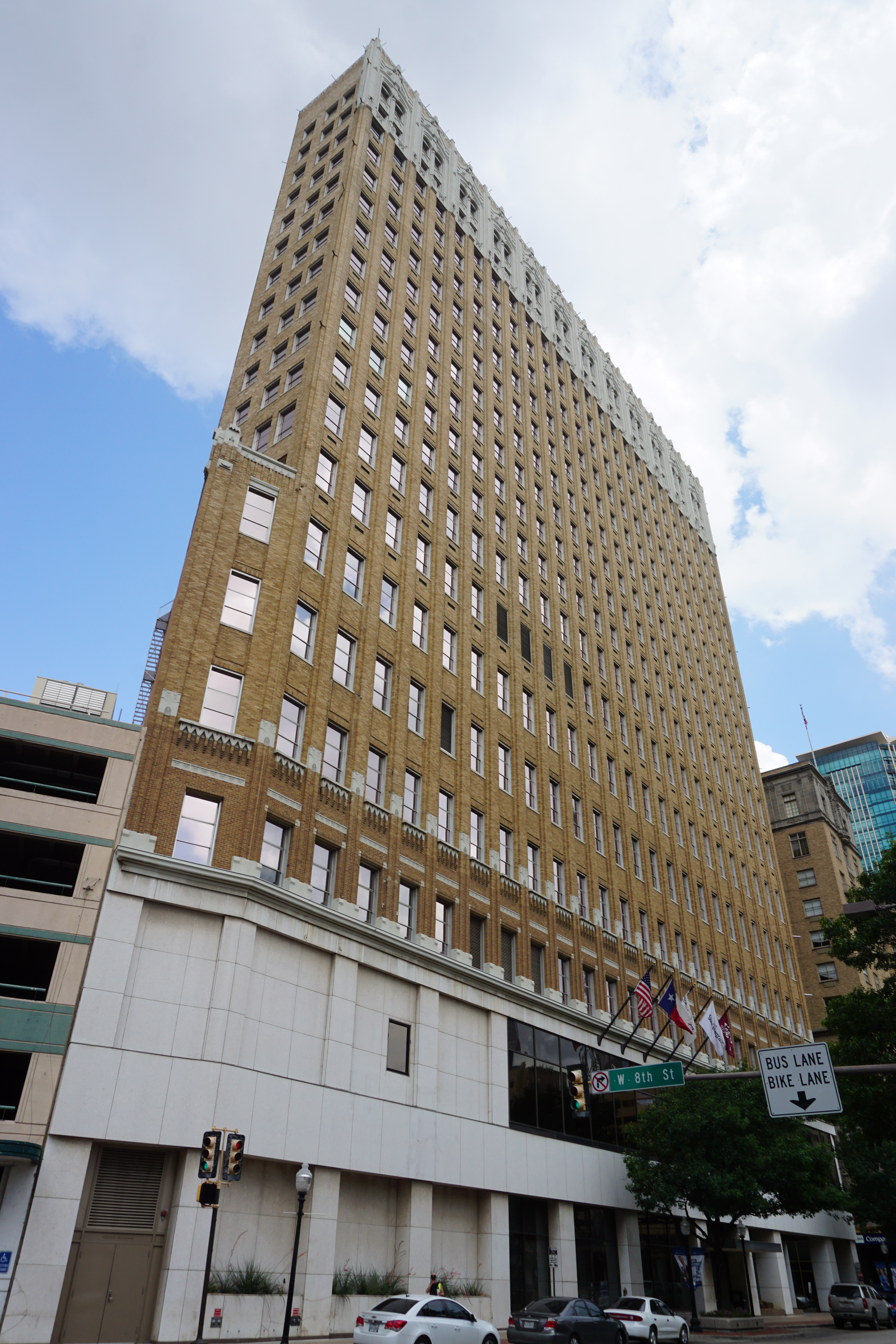
Headquarters of the Fort Worth Star-Telegram

Fort Worth has one major daily newspaper, Fort Worth Star-Telegram, founded in 1906 as Fort Worth Star. It dominates the western half of the Dallas–Fort Worth metroplex, and The Dallas Morning News dominates the east. In 2023, the publication's print circulation was 43,342.

KXAS studios and offices (as well as those of co-owned KXTX-TV, and for a time those of radio stations WBAP (AM) and KSCS-FM) were located in this building east of downtown Fort Worth on Barnett Street.

The Fort Worth Weekly is an alternative weekly newspaper for the Fort Worth metropolitan division. The newspaper had an approximate circulation of 47,000 in 2015. The Fort Worth Weekly published and features, among many things, news reporting, cultural event guides, movie reviews, and editorials. Additionally, Fort Worth Business Press is a weekly publication that chronicles news in the Fort Worth business community.

The Fort Worth Report is a daily nonprofit news organization covering local government, business, education and arts in Tarrant County. The nonprofit organization, founded by local business leaders and former Fort Worth Star-Telegram publisher Wes Turner, announced its intentions in February 2021 and officially launched the newsroom in April 2021.

The Fort Worth Press was a daily newspaper, published weekday afternoons and on Sundays from 1921 until 1975. It was owned by the E. W. Scripps Company and published under the then-prominent Scripps-Howard Lighthouse logo. The paper reportedly last made money in the early 1950s. Scripps Howard stayed with the paper until mid-1975. Circulation had dwindled to fewer than 30,000 daily, just more than 10% of that of the Fort Worth Star Telegram. The name Fort Worth Press was resurrected briefly in a new Fort Worth Press paper operated by then-former publisher Bill McAda and briefer still by William Dean Singleton, then-owner of the weekly Azle (Texas) News, now owner of the Media Central news group. The Fort Worth Press operated from offices and presses at 500 Jones Street in Downtown Fort Worth.

Television stations shared with Dallas include (owned-and-operated stations of their affiliated networks are highlighted in bold) KDFW 4 (Fox), KXAS 5 (NBC), WFAA 8 (ABC), KTVT 11 (CBS), KERA 13 (PBS), KTXA 21 (Independent), KDFI 27 (MNTV), KDAF 33 (CW), and K07AAD-D (HC2 Holdings).

=== Radio stations ===
Over 33 radio stations operate in and around Fort Worth, with many different formats.

==== AM ====
On the AM dial, like in all other markets, political talk radio is prevalent, with WBAP 820, KLIF 570, KSKY 660, KFJZ 870, KRLD 1080 the conservative talk stations serving Fort Worth and KMNY 1360 the sole progressive talk station serving the city. KFXR 1190 is a news/talk/classic country station. Sports talk can be found on KTCK 1310 ("The Ticket"). WBAP, a 50,000-watt clear-channel station which can be heard over much of the country at night, was a long-successful country music station before converting to its current talk format.

Several religious stations are also on AM in the Dallas/Fort Worth area; KHVN 970 and KGGR 1040 are the local urban gospel stations, KEXB 1440 carries Catholic talk programming from Relevant Radio, and KKGM 1630 has a Southern gospel format.

Fort Worth's Spanish-speaking population is served by many stations on AM:

- KAMM 1540
- KDFT 540
- KHFX 1140
- KFLC 1270
- KTNO 1700
- KNGO 1480

A few mixed Asian language stations serve Fort Worth:

- KHSE 700
- KKDA 730
- KTXV 890
- KVTT 1110
- KZEE 1220
- KCLE 1460
- KRVA 1600

==== FM ====
KLNO is a commercial radio station licensed to Fort Worth. Long-time Fort Worth resident Marcos A. Rodriguez operated Dallas-Fort Worth radio stations KLTY and KESS on 94.1 FM. Two urban contemporary radio stations, KBFB 97.9 and KKDA 104.5, and an urban adult contemporary radio station, KRNB 105.7, can also be heard. A wide variety of commercial formats, mostly music, are on the FM dial in Fort Worth.

Noncommercial stations serve the city fairly well. Three college stations can be heard - KTCU 88.7, KCBI 90.9, and KNTU 88.1, with a variety of programming. Also, the local NPR station is KERA 90.1, along with community radio station KNON 89.3. Downtown Fort Worth also hosts the Texas Country radio station KFWR 95.9 The Ranch.

==== Internet radio stations and shows ====
When local radio station KOAI 107.5 FM, now KMVK, dropped its smooth jazz format, fans set up smoothjazz1075.com, an internet radio station, to broadcast smooth jazz for disgruntled fans.

== Transportation ==
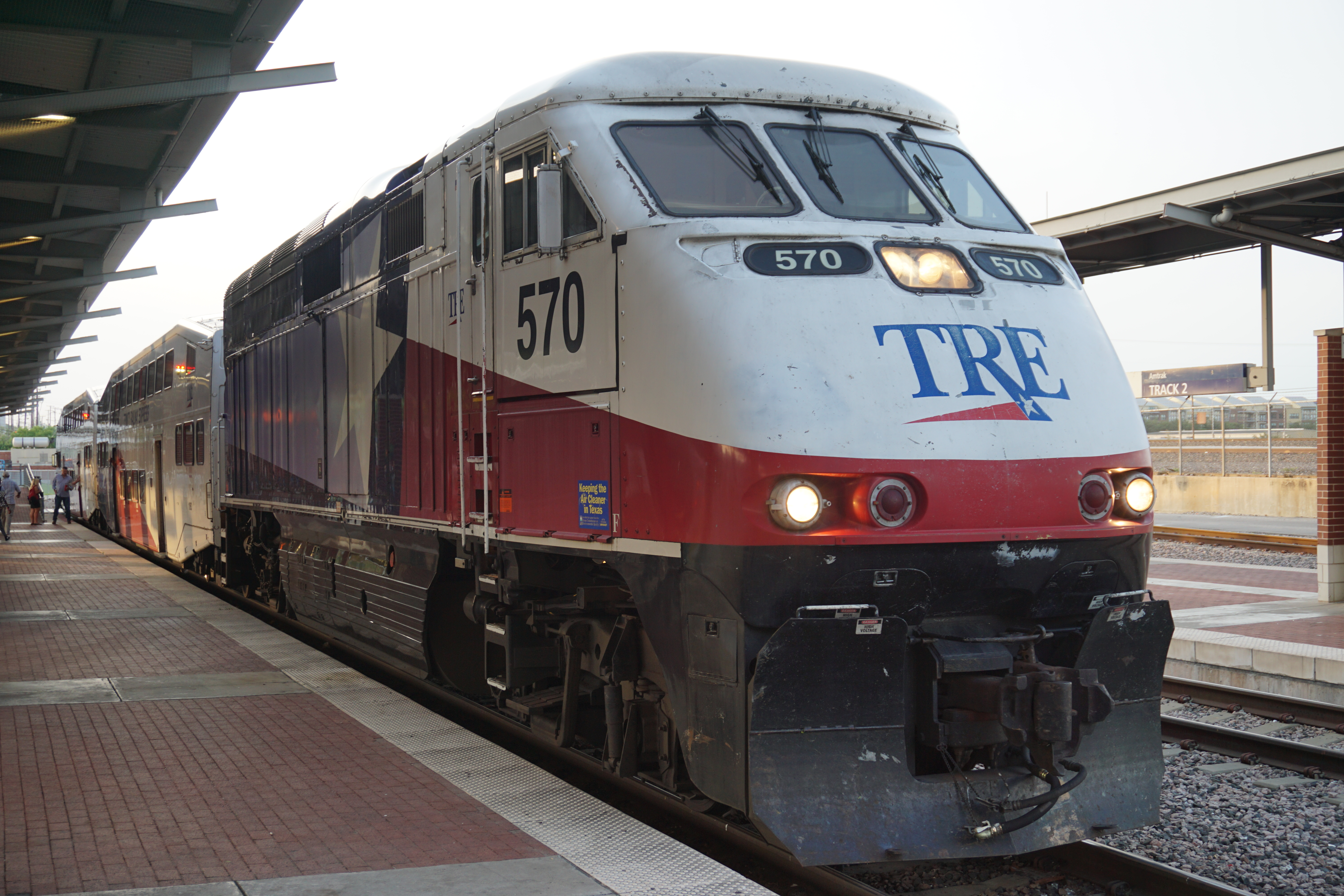
The Trinity Railway Express

Like most cities that grew quickly after World War II, Fort Worth's main mode of transportation is the automobile, but bus transportation via Trinity Metro is available, as well as an interurban train service to Dallas via the Trinity Railway Express. As of January 10, 2019, train service from Downtown Fort Worth to Dallas/Fort Worth International Airport's Terminal B is available via Trinity Metro's TEXRail service.

=== History ===
==== Electric streetcars ====
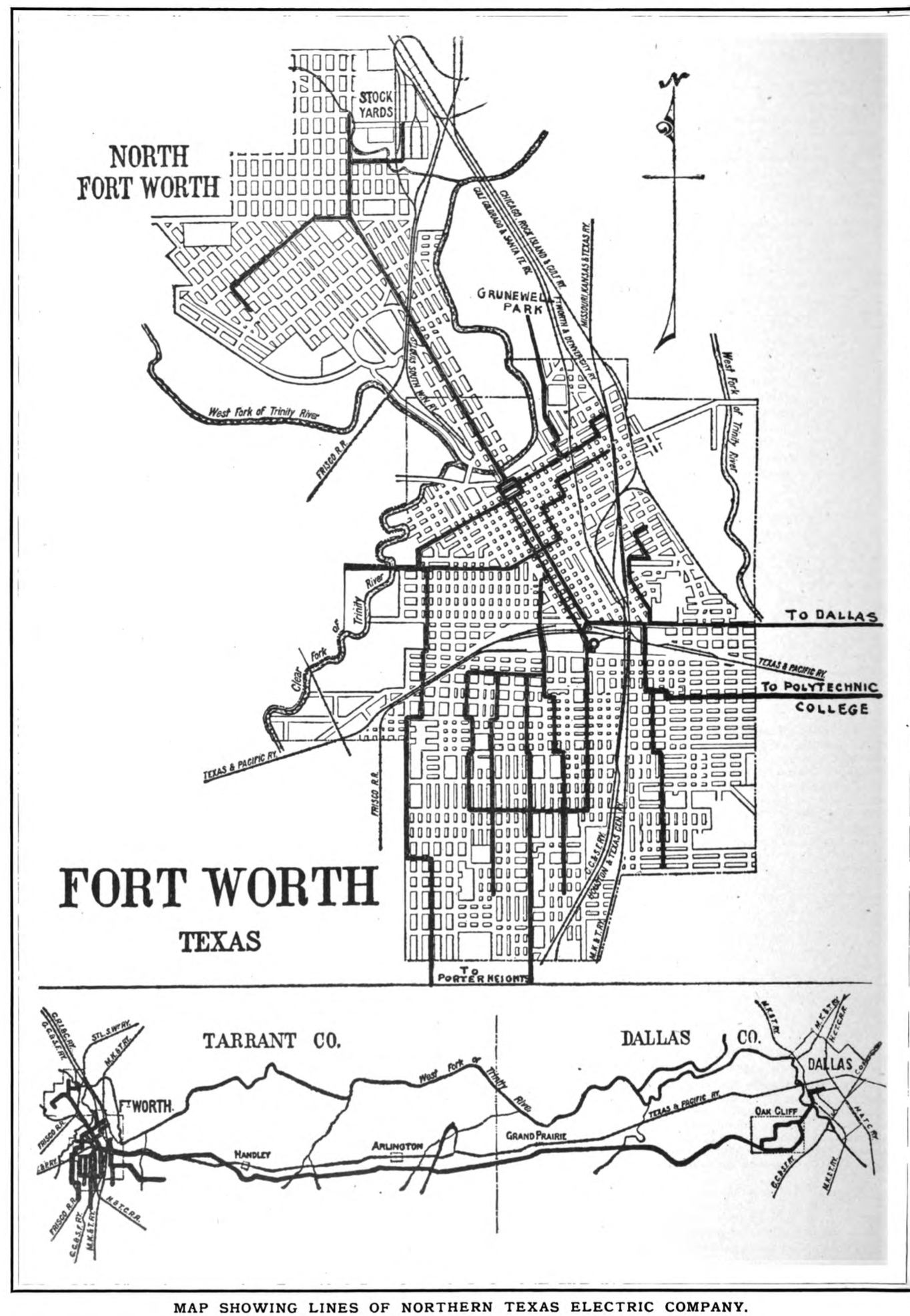
"Map showing lines of the Northern Texas Electric Company (Fort Worth)", c. 1907

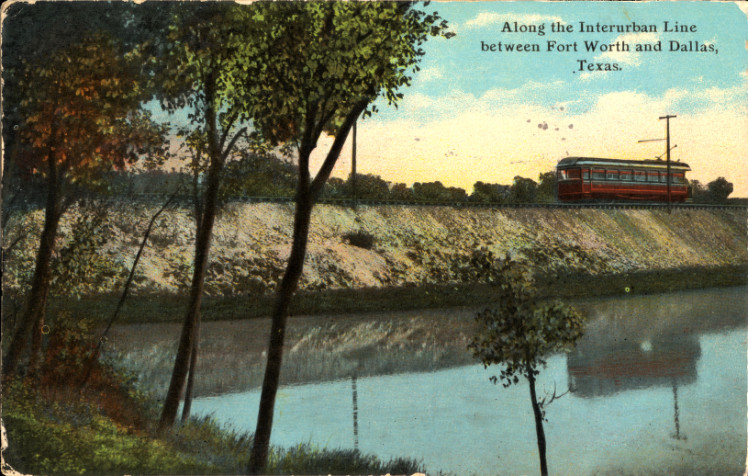
Interurban line between Fort Worth and Dallas, Texas (postcard, circa 1902–1924)

The first streetcar company in Fort Worth was the Fort Worth Street Railway Company. Its first line began operating in December 1876, and traveled from the courthouse down Main Street to the T&P Depot. By 1890, more than 20 private companies were operating streetcar lines in Fort Worth. The Fort Worth Street Railway Company bought out many of its competitors, and was eventually itself bought out by the Bishop & Sherwin Syndicate in 1901. The new ownership changed the company's name to the Northern Texas Traction Company, which operated 84 miles of streetcar railways in 1925, and their lines connected downtown Fort Worth to TCU, the Near Southside, Arlington Heights, Lake Como, and the Stockyards. The last streetcars ran in 1937. Between early 1963 and summer 2002 the Tandy Center Subway operated electric streetcars purchased from Washington D.C.

==== Electric interurban railways ====
At its peak, the electric interurban industry in Texas consisted of almost 500 miles of track, making Texas the second in interurban mileage in all states west of the Mississippi River. Electric interurban railways were prominent in the early 1900s, peaking in the 1910s and fading until all electric interurban railways were abandoned by 1948. Close to three-fourths of the mileage was in the Dallas–Fort Worth area, running between Fort Worth and Dallas and to other area cities including Cleburne, Denison, Corsicana, and Waco. The line depicted in the associated image was the second to be constructed in Texas and ran 35 miles between Fort Worth and Dallas. Northern Texas Traction Company built the railway, which was operational from 1902 to 1934.

=== Current transport ===
In 2009, 80.6% of Fort Worth (city) commuters drive to work alone. The 2009 mode share for Fort Worth (city) commuters are 11.7% for carpooling, 1.5% for transit, 1.2% for walking, and .1% for cycling. In 2015, the American Community Survey estimated modal shares for Fort Worth (city) commuters of 82% for driving alone, 12% for carpooling, .8% for riding transit, 1.8% for walking, and .3% for cycling. The city of Fort Worth has a lower than average percentage of households without a car. In 2015, 6.1 percent of Fort Worth households lacked a car, and decreased to 4.8 percent in 2016. The national average was 8.7 percent in 2016. Fort Worth averaged 1.83 cars per household in 2016, compared to a national average of 1.8.

==== Roads ====
Fort Worth is served by four interstates and three U.S. highways. It also contains a number of arterial streets in a grid formation.

Interstate highways 30, 20, 35W, and 820 all pass through the city limits.

Interstate 820 is a loop of Interstate 20 and serves as a beltway for the city. Interstate 30 and Interstate 20 connect Fort Worth to Arlington, Grand Prairie, and Dallas. Interstate 35W connects Fort Worth with Hillsboro to the south and the cities of Denton and Gainesville to the north.

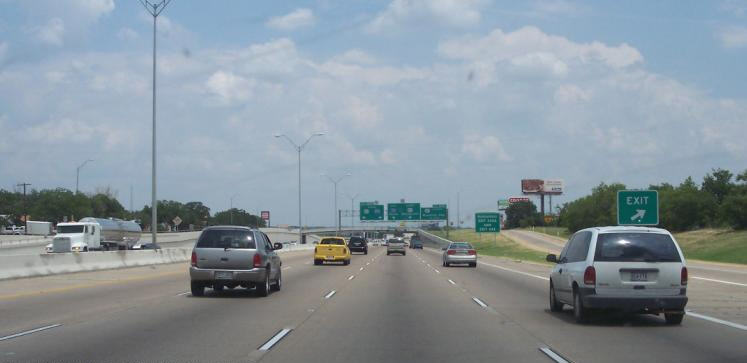
I-20 in southern Fort Worth

U.S. Route 287 runs southeast through the city connecting Wichita Falls to the north and Mansfield to the south. U.S. Route 377 runs south through the northern suburbs of Haltom City and Keller through the central business district. U.S. Route 81 shares a concurrency with highway 287 on the portion northwest of I-35W.

Notable state highways:

- Texas State Highway 114 (east-west)
- Texas State Highway 183 (east-west)
- Texas State Highway 121 (north-south)

==== Public transportation ====
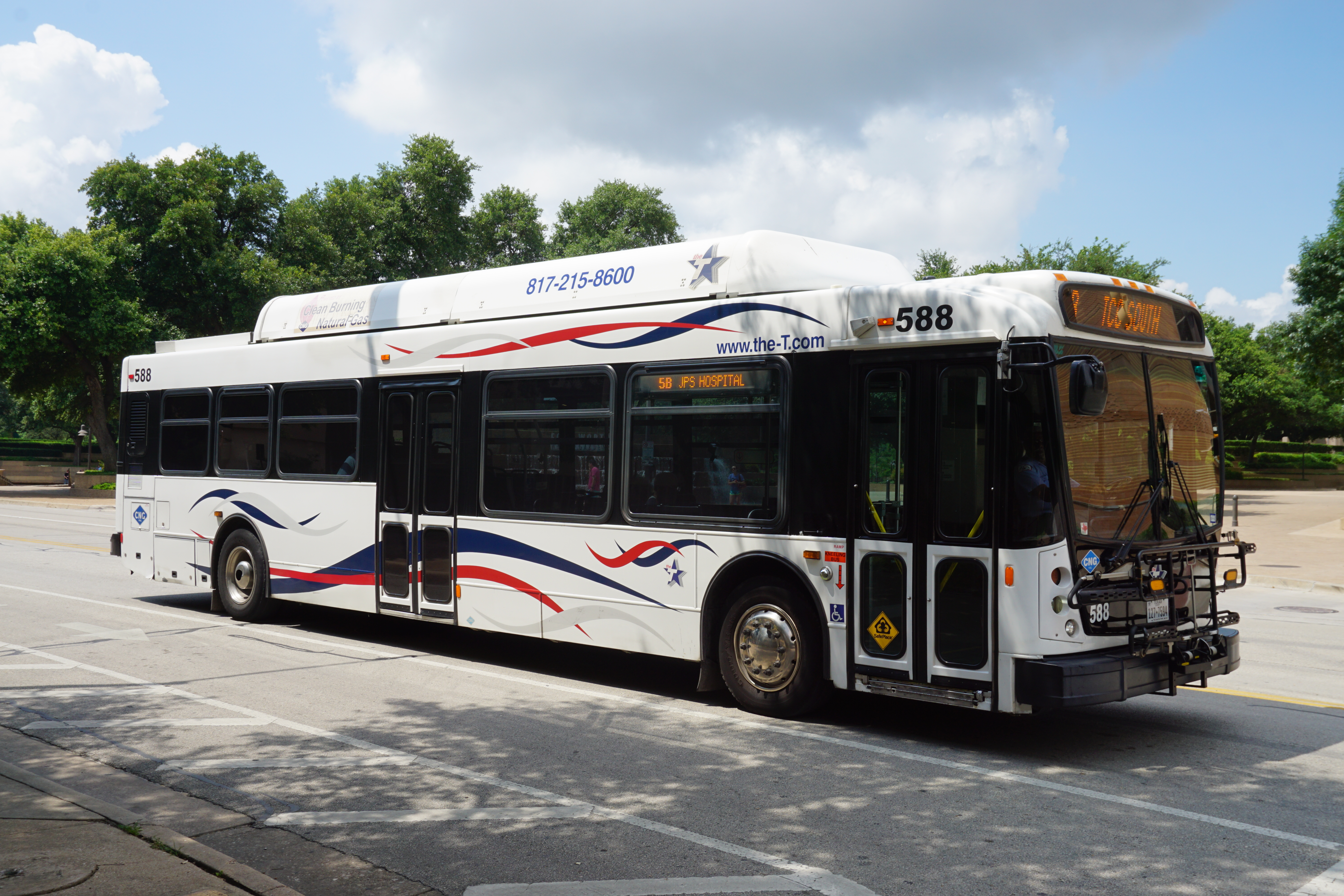
"The T" bus in Ft. Worth, 2016

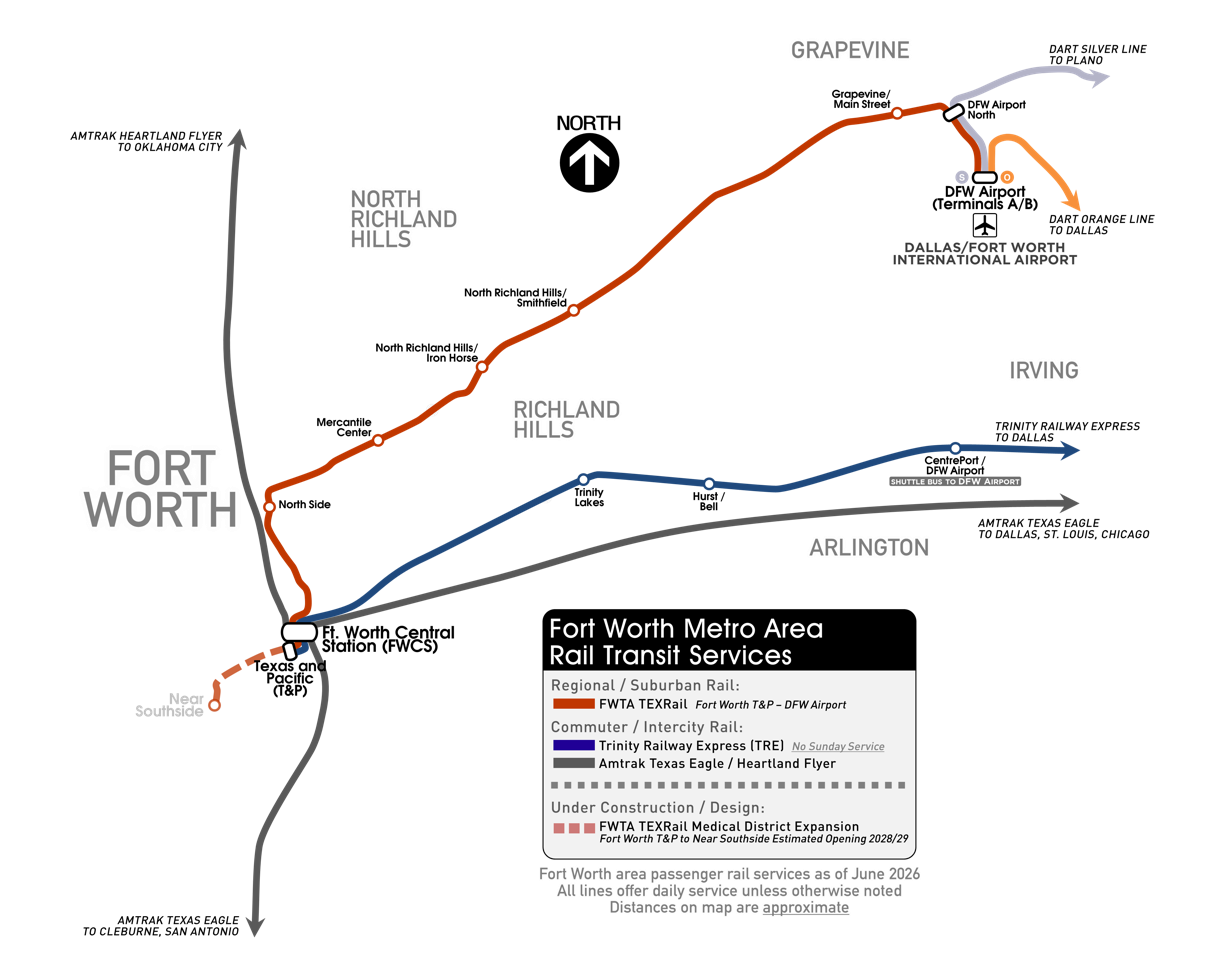
Map of public rail transit in the Fort Worth metro area

Trinity Metro, formerly known as the Fort Worth Transportation Authority, serves Fort Worth with dozens of different bus routes throughout the city, including a downtown bus circulator known as Molly the Trolley. In addition to Fort Worth, Trinity Metro operates buses in the suburbs of Blue Mound, Forest Hill, River Oaks and Sansom Park.

In 2010, Fort Worth won a $25 million Federal Urban Circulator grant to build a streetcar system. In December 2010, though, the city council forfeited the grant by voting to end the streetcar study.

In July 2019, Trinity Metro partnered with Via Transportation to launch an on-demand microtransit service called ZIPZONE. ZIPZONE offers shared rides across the Alliance, Mercantile, Southside, and South Tarrant neighborhoods and was designed as a first-and-last mile connection for TEXRail and bus commuters. Trips are booked from a smartphone app and charge a flat $3 for service as of April 2021. ZIPZONE rides are also included with multi-ride Trinity Metro local tickets.

==== Rail transportation ====
- TEXRail is a commuter rail line opened in January 2019 that connects downtown Fort Worth with Dallas/Fort Worth International Airport, with stops in the cities of Grapevine and North Richland Hills.
- Trinity Railway Express is a commuter rail line that operates between T&P Station in downtown Fort Worth and terminates at Dallas Union Station.
- Two Amtrak routes stop at Fort Worth Central: Heartland Flyer and Texas Eagle.

==== Airports ====
Dallas Fort Worth International Airport is a major commercial airport located between the major cities of Fort Worth and Dallas. DFW Airport is the world's third-busiest airport based on operations and tenth-busiest airport based on passengers.

Prior to the construction of the DFW Airport, the city was served by Greater Southwest International Airport, which was located just to the south of the new airport. Originally named Amon Carter Field after the publisher of the Fort Worth Star-Telegram, Greater Southwest opened in 1953 and operated as the primary airport for Fort Worth until 1974. It was then abandoned until the terminal was torn down in 1980. The site of the former airport is now a mixed-use development straddled by Texas State Highway 183 and 360. One small section of runway remains north of Highway 183, and serves as the only reminder that a major commercial airport once occupied the site.

Fort Worth is home to these four airports within city limits:

- Fort Worth Alliance Airport
- Fort Worth Meacham International Airport
- Fort Worth Spinks Airport
- Naval Air Station Joint Reserve Base Fort Worth

==== Walkability ====
A 2011 study by Walk Score ranked Fort Worth 47th-most walkable of 50 largest U.S. cities.

== Sister cities ==
Fort Worth is a part of the Sister Cities International program and maintains cultural and economic exchange programs with its sister cities:

- Reggio Emilia, Emilia-Romagna, Italy (1985)
- Nagaoka, Niigata, Japan (1987)
- Trier, Rhineland-Palatinate, Germany (1987)
- Bandung, West Java, Indonesia (1990)
- Budapest, Hungary (1990)
- Toluca, Estado de Mexico, Mexico (1998)
- Mbabane, Eswatini (2004)
- Guiyang, Guizhou, China (2010)
- Nîmes, Occitania, France (2019)

== See also ==
- Forts of Texas
- List of museums in North Texas
- List of people from Fort Worth, Texas
- National Juneteenth Museum
