= Preston Geren Jr. =

American architect

Preston M. Geren Jr. FAIA
- Born: December 16, 1923; Fort Worth, Texas
- Died: June 12, 2013 (aged 89); Fort Worth, Texas
- Education: Texas A&M University; Georgia Tech
- Occupation: Architect
- Years active: 1947–1984
- Spouses: Shirley Lupton (m. 1948; div. 1953) Colleen Edwards (m. 1954; died 2012)
- Children: 5, including Charlie Geren and Pete Geren
- Parent(s): Preston M. Geren Sr. and Linda Giesecke Geren
- Awards: Fellow of the American Institute of Architects (1973)
- Practice: Geren and Associates
- Buildings: Kimbell Art Museum; Burnett Plaza; Arlington Stadium
- Projects: Campus of Texas A&M University

Preston Murdoch Geren Jr. FAIA (December 16, 1923 – June 12, 2013) was an American architect. A lifelong resident of Fort Worth, Texas, Geren designed or served as associate architect for many of Fort Worth's most notable buildings constructed during his working life.

== Early life, military service and family ==
Geren was born in Fort Worth in 1923 to architect Preston Geren Sr. and his wife, Linda Giesecke Geren. Linda was the daughter of Preston Sr.'s architecture partner, Frederick Giesecke, a prominent Texas architect who founded the architecture program at Texas A&M University and served as Texas A&M's official campus architect.

Geren graduated from Arlington Heights High School and enrolled in Texas A&M's architecture program in 1941. Like many college students during World War II, he interrupted his academic career and entered the U.S. Army in December 1942. He served with distinction in Europe, earning a Silver Star, two Bronze Stars, and a Purple Heart before his discharge as a first lieutenant in 1946.

After the war, Geren resumed his architecture studies at Georgia Tech, graduating in 1947. In 1948, he married Shirley Lupton. They had two sons: Charlie Geren, a future Texas state representative, and Preston M. "Pete" Geren III, a future U.S. representative and secretary of the Army. Geren and Lupton divorced in 1953 and he remarried to Colleen Edwards in 1954. He adopted Edwards' son from her first marriage and they had two additional daughters.

== Professional career ==
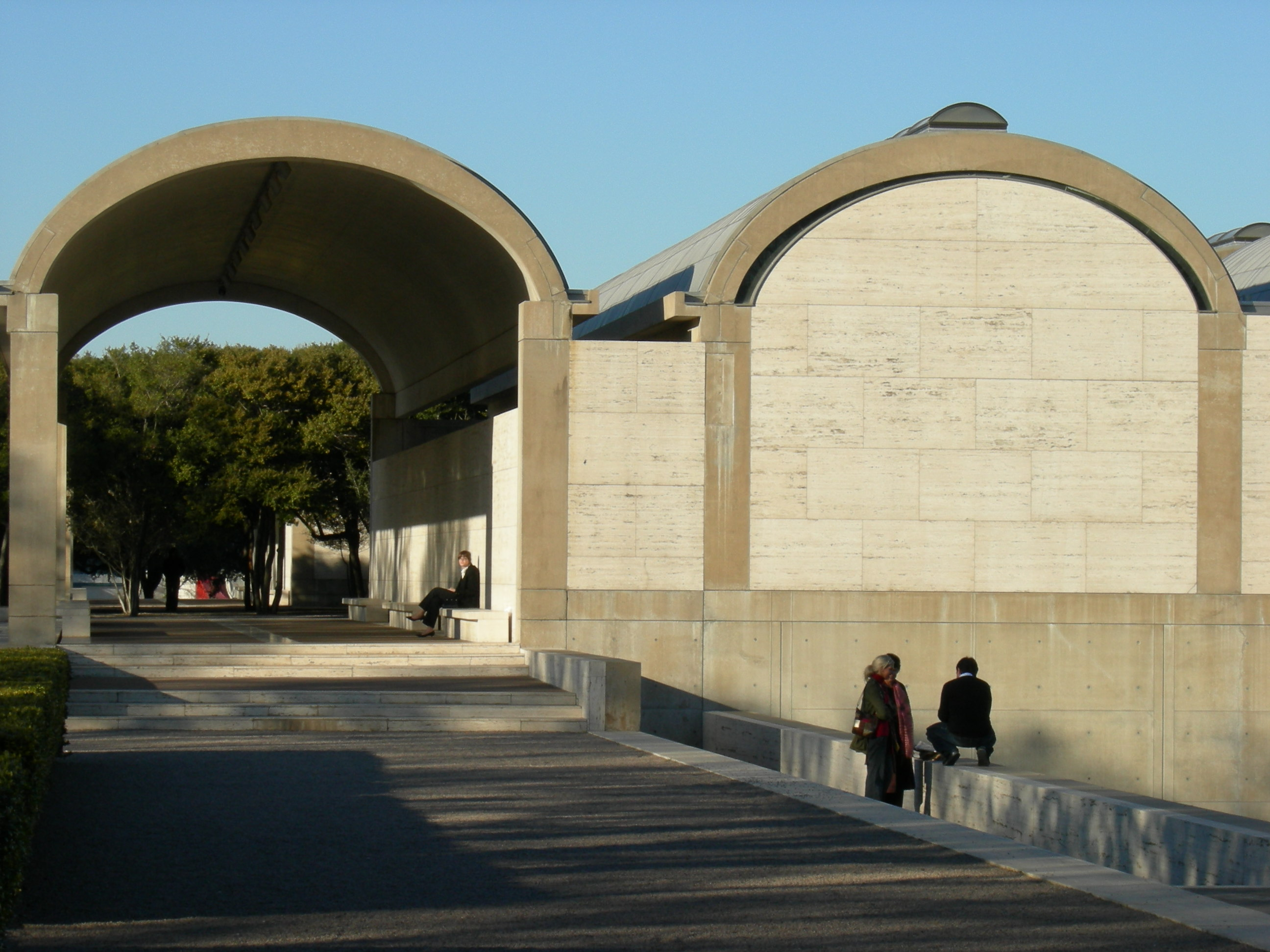
Geren served as associate architect on Louis Kahn's Kimbell Art Museum.

In 1947, Geren joined his father's firm, Preston M. Geren Architects and Engineers, becoming a partner in 1949. He took over leadership of the firm after his father's death in 1969. One of his earliest projects was a parish house for St. Andrew's Episcopal Church, where he was a member. During the years when both Gerens worked together, the firm's projects included the Landmark Tower, Arlington Stadium, the Fort Worth Convention Center, Welch Hall at UT Austin, and the Eller O&M Building at Texas A&M. Geren was named a Fellow of the American Institute of Architects in 1973.

== Significant work ==
Geren was a major contributor to architecture in Fort Worth and at Texas universities. His firm designed projects at Texas Christian University, the University of Texas Medical Branch, Southwestern Baptist Theological Seminary, the University of Texas at Arlington, Texas A&M and several community colleges, as well as buildings in 137 Texas school districts. His practice also included hospital, church, bank and office building projects.

Geren was the local associate architect working with Louis Kahn on the Kimbell Art Museum. This was a common practice in Fort Worth with out-of-town architects, and Kahn had a reputation for significant time and cost overruns. The Geren firm was known locally for bringing in projects on time and within budget. The contract called for control over construction to be turned over to Geren when Kahn had finished the design, a provision that eventually led to conflict because Kahn felt that a design was never finished until the building was constructed. The museum trustees settled the issue by deciding that Geren would report directly to them instead of to Kahn, but that Kahn would have final say over the design.

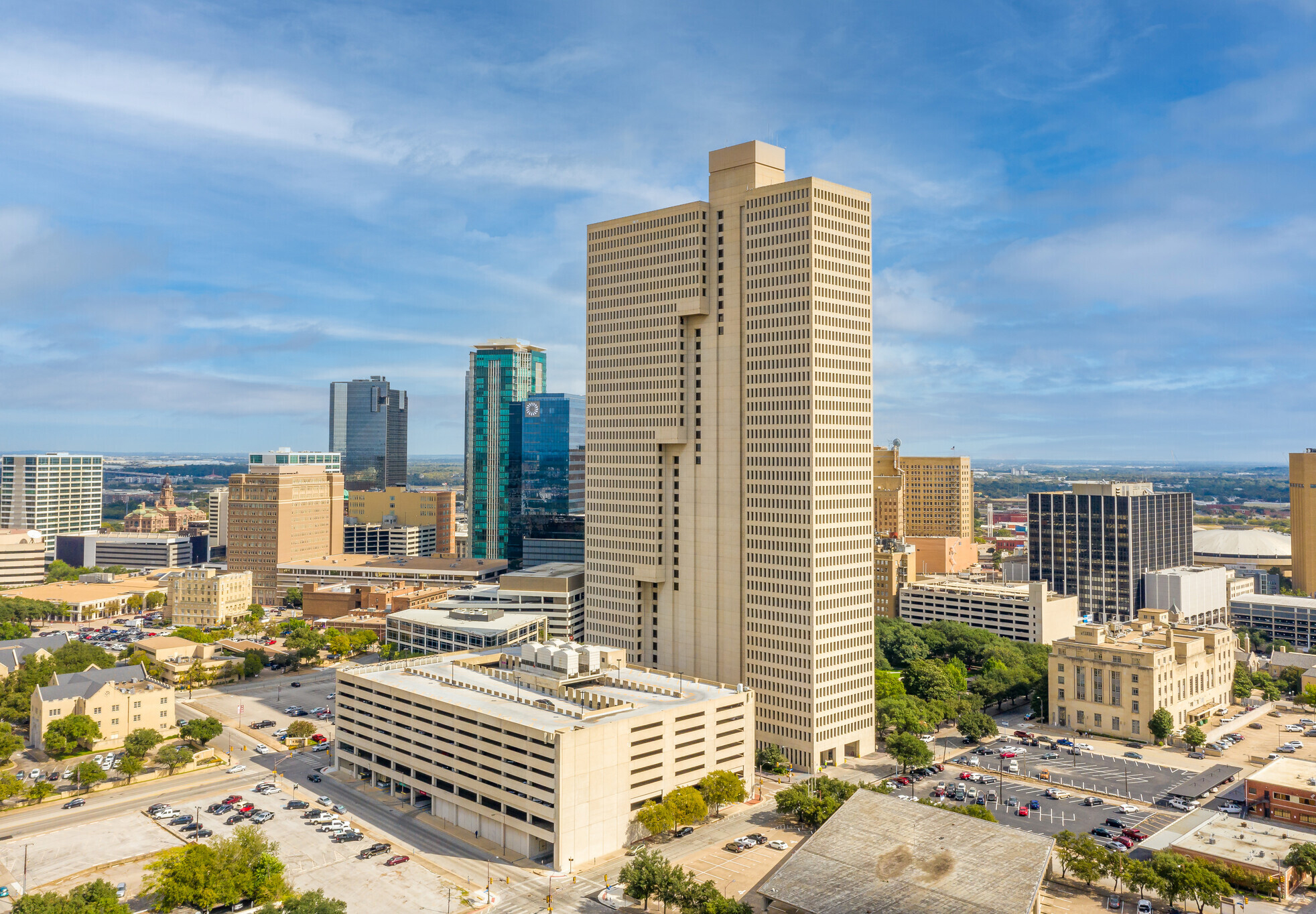
Geren's firm designed Fort Worth's tallest building, Burnett Plaza.

Geren's contributions to the Fort Worth skyline include Burnett Plaza (1983), Fort Worth's tallest building. Other notable buildings designed by Geren include the Clayton Williams Alumni Center at Texas A&M.

As an architectural business leader, Geren built Geren and Associates into one of the nation's 25 largest architectural firms and one of the largest firms in Texas by the early 1980s. With its lineage to Sanguinet and Staats, Geren and Associates was considered by architect Mark Gunderson to be the "primary 'branch' in the tree of Fort Worth architectural firms."

== Philanthropy and civic leadership ==
As a civic leader, Geren chaired the Trinity Improvement Association, was organizer and president of Streams and Valleys, was president of the Exchange Club, and served as a board member of the Fort Worth Children's Hospital, the Fort Worth Museum of Science and History, and the Fort Worth Symphony. He was elected to the Westover Hills, Texas, City Council and the Tarrant Regional Water District. Geren was an active corporate board member as well, serving on the boards of Ridglea State Bank, Equitable Savings and Loan, Fort Worth National Bank, Gibraltar Savings Bank, First United Bancorp, Enserch Corp., Pool Well Service Co. and Ebasco Services Co. He co-founded and served on the board of Overton Bank and Trust.

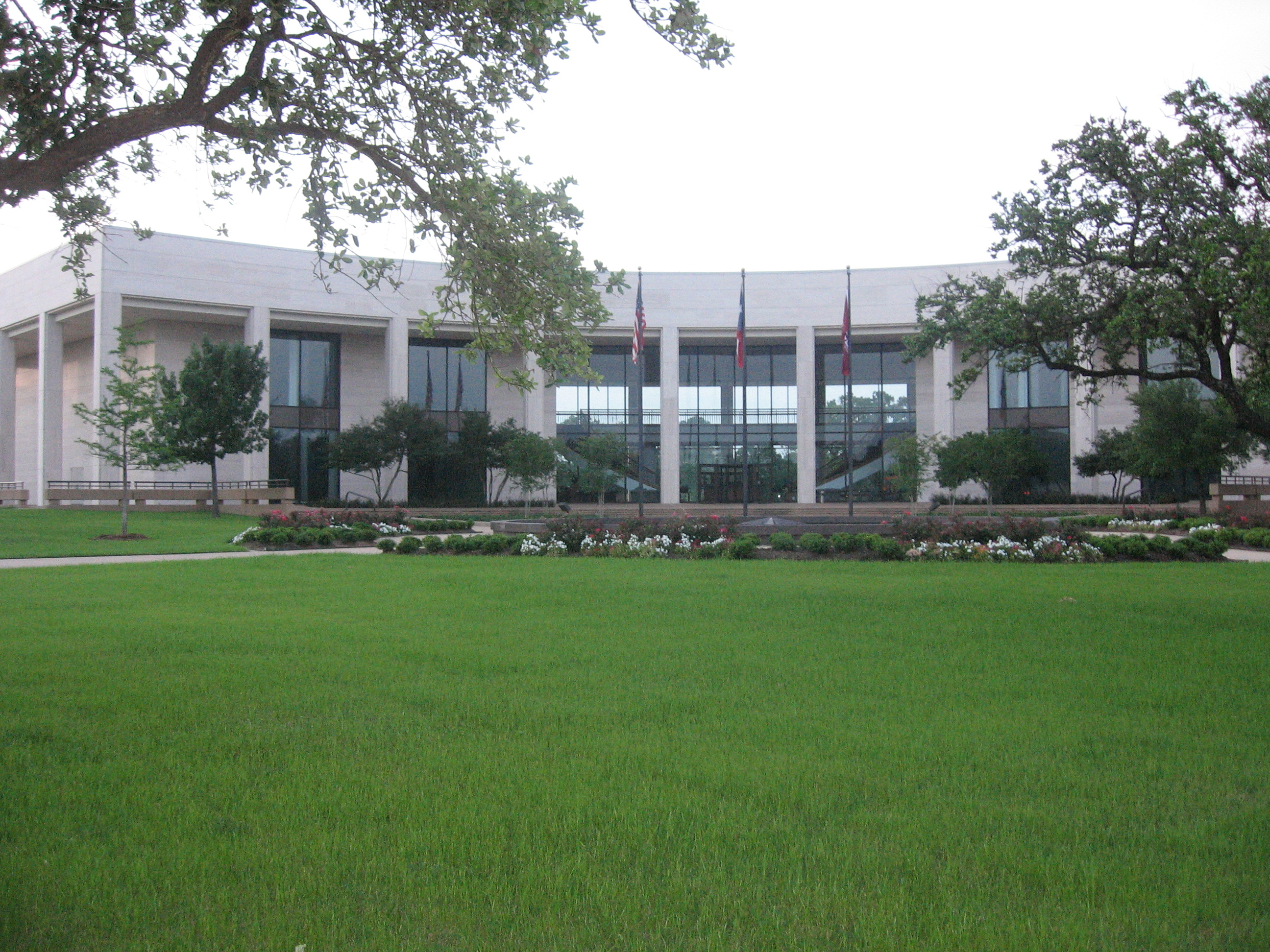
The Clayton Williams Alumni Center at Texas A&M, a Geren-designed building that is home to the Association of Former Students.

Geren had a lifelong association with Texas A&M, sponsoring seven scholarships at the university and receiving the Fort Worth A&M Club Lifetime Achievement Award. He also contributed to the Preston M. Geren Auditorium, named in honor of Preston Geren Sr., and the Frederick Giesecke Lecture Series. He was on the committee for the George H.W. Bush Presidential Library and Museum and served on advisory committees for the Texas A&M chancellor and president and served as president of the 12th Man Foundation at Texas A&M. He also created the Preston M. Geren Excellence Fund and the Dr. F.E. Giesecke 1886 Lecture Fund to fund speaker series and events for Texas A&M architecture students. In 2007, Texan A&M recognized him with its Distinguished Alumnus Award.

== Later life ==
In 1982, Geren merged his firm into Texas architectural firm Caudill Rowlett Scott, which later merged into HOK. Geren retired from the firm in 1984. He died after a long illness on June 12, 2013.
