= Preston Geren =

Preston Geren may refer to:

- Preston Geren Sr., American architect and engineer
- Preston Geren Jr., American architect and son of Preston Geren Sr.
- Preston "Pete" Geren III, American politician and son of Preston Geren Jr.
