= Wells Fargo Tower (Fort Worth, Texas) =

Skyscraper located in Fort Worth Texas and headquarters for Bass family companies

Coordinates: 32.7564°N 97.3318°W

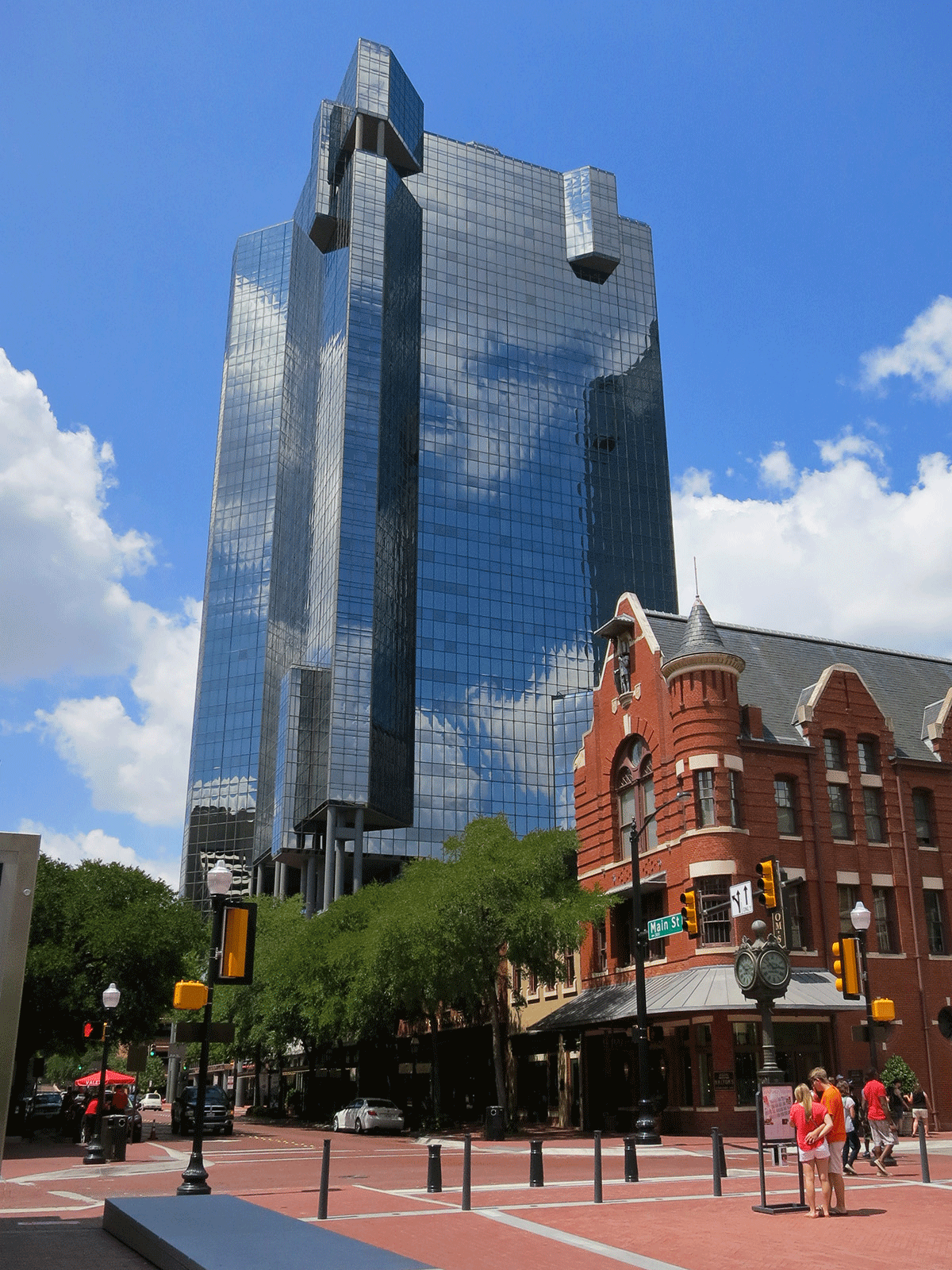
- Interactive map of the Wells Fargo Tower area

General information
- Type: Office
- Location: 201 Main St.
- Completed: 1982

Height
- Height: 477 ft (145 m)

Technical details
- Floor count: 33

Wells Fargo Tower, Fort Worth is a building located in Fort Worth, Texas. At 477 feet (145 meters), it is Fort Worth's fifth tallest building. It has 33 floors. It is surrounded by Commerce Street, East 1st Street, East 2nd Street, and Main Street. It was completed in 1982. It was the tallest building in Fort Worth from 1982 until 1983 when the Burnett Plaza was completed. Wells Fargo Tower is the shorter of the two towers in the City Center Towers Complex. The structures resemble pinwheels but are not true twins.

== See also ==
List of tallest buildings in Fort Worth

Records
Preceded by The Fort Worth Tower	Tallest building in Fort Worth; 477 feet (145 m); 1982-1983	Succeeded by Burnett Plaza
