= Landmark Tower (Fort Worth, Texas) =

Demolished skyscraper in Fort Worth, Texas US

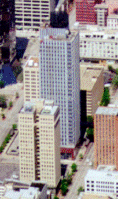
- The building seen from near Throckmorton Street
- Former names: Continental National Bank Building/CNB Building (1957–1982), Texas Building (1982–1998)

General information
- Type: Office
- Location: 200 West 7th Street, Fort Worth, Texas
- Coordinates: 32.75237°N 97.33131°W
- Groundbreaking: June 26, 1950
- Completed: February 1957
- Opened: 1957
- Closed: 1990
- Demolished: March 18, 2006
- Owner: XTO Energy (2004–2006)

Height
- Tip: 420 feet (130 m)
- Roof: 380 feet (120 m)

Technical details
- Floor count: 30

Design and construction
- Architecture firm: Preston M. Geren & Associates
- Main contractor: Thos. S. Byrne, Fort Worth

The Landmark Tower was a 30-story skyscraper located at 200 West 7th Street in Downtown Fort Worth, Texas. Designed by Fort Worth architecture firm Preston M. Geren & Associates, Landmark Tower was the tallest building in the city from its opening in 1957 until the completion of the Fort Worth National Bank Tower in 1974. After being abandoned in 1990, the tower stood vacant for more than 15 years until it was demolished in 2006. It is one of the tallest buildings ever to be demolished.

== Construction ==
The original lower half brick and granite building broke ground on June 26, 1950, it was originally designed as a 28-story brick tower with a red granite base. Although unfinished, it opened in 1952, was four stories tall and had one floor of the brick façade above the granite base and served as the bank lobby. The building was originally built as the headquarters of the Continental National Bank of Fort Worth and ground was broken for the tower in 1952. However, the building only reached the fourth floor before construction was halted due to adverse economic conditions. As the economy picked back up again, construction began again in 1956, 26 additional floors were added, and was completed. The building opened in 1957.

The building was redesigned to support the rotating digital clock, which included cladding the building with an aluminum curtain wall instead of brick. It was built using a conventional steel frame with an aluminum curtain wall. At the time of its completion, the 380-foot (120 m) building was the tallest in the city, surpassing the 307-foot (94 m) 714 Main, built in 1921.

== Lifespan ==
When the building opened in 1957, it included a four-sided 32-foot tall revolving digital clock and sign at the roof. Costing $196,000 and weighing 77 tons, it was the largest revolving digital clock and sign in the world at the time. It was once listed in the Guinness Book of World Records. As it was not included in the original designs, the installation required that the entire building be strengthened to support its weight. The clock spelled the letters "CNB", the initials for the Continental National Bank illuminated by green neon lights on two sides, and the time in white flood lights on the other two sides. As well as the addition of the clock, two extra floors were also added to the building.

In addition, in 1971, a 90-foot long skywalk was built from the building's northeast side across Houston Street to provide easy access to a neighboring parking garage. Although the machinery to rotate the clock stopped working in 1978, it was secured in place rather than being repaired. The clock continued to display the time until 1991.

The Continental National Bank moved their headquarters to the Continental Plaza (Now known as 777 Main Street) building in 1982.

In the mid-1980s, the building was purchased by Empire of America Federal Savings Bank. The "CNB" (Continental National Bank) letters on the four-sided digital sign and clock were dismantled in 1986, and replaced with "the Big E" Empire of America signage.

== Abandonment and demolition ==
Following Empire of America's seizure by the United States government, the building was abandoned in 1990 and stood vacant for the next 16 years. The building was hit by an F3 tornado on March 28, 2000, and suffered significant damage. The four-sided digital clock and sign was removed from April 15–21, 2000, by orders of the City of Fort Worth for safety reasons. The skywalk was also removed during the same time. The building went through several owners through the years, and plans were to convert the skyscraper into a luxury apartment and condominium high-rise in a similar fate to The Tower, however the project went bankrupt.

The building was purchased under foreclosure by XTO Energy in January 2004. The company looked into all alternatives to restore, refurbish, and construct around the building. After determining that the estimated $62 million cost to refurbish the building was prohibitive, the company decided to raze the building to use the site for parking space and possibly a new building in the future. Demolition permits were discreetly acquired in October 2005, and the company contracted Midwest Wrecking Company in November 2005 to perform the demolition. The brick and red granite bank lobby was manually demolished or gutted, and after four months of preparation, the building was demolished by controlled explosive implosion on March 18, 2006, at 7:40 AM. The demolition used 364 pounds (165 kg) of explosives and required 15 city blocks to be evacuated. Although at the time, XTO Energy discussed plans to eventually build a new 50-story skyscraper in its place. The envisioned skyscraper was named the XTO Energy Headquarters.

Cleanup lasted from 2006 until finishing in 2009. From 2009 to 2016, the site was occupied by a simple parking lot. In 2016 construction began on "Cowtown Place", a 6 level parking garage to replace the building site. The Cowtown Place parking garage was completed in 2017.

== See also ==
- List of tallest voluntarily demolished buildings

Records
Preceded by 714 Main	Tallest building in Fort Worth; 380 feet (120 m); 1957-1974	Succeeded by The Fort Worth Tower
