= Bank of America Tower (Fort Worth) =

Skyscraper in Fort Worth, Texas, U.S.

Coordinates: 32.7561°N 97.3306°W

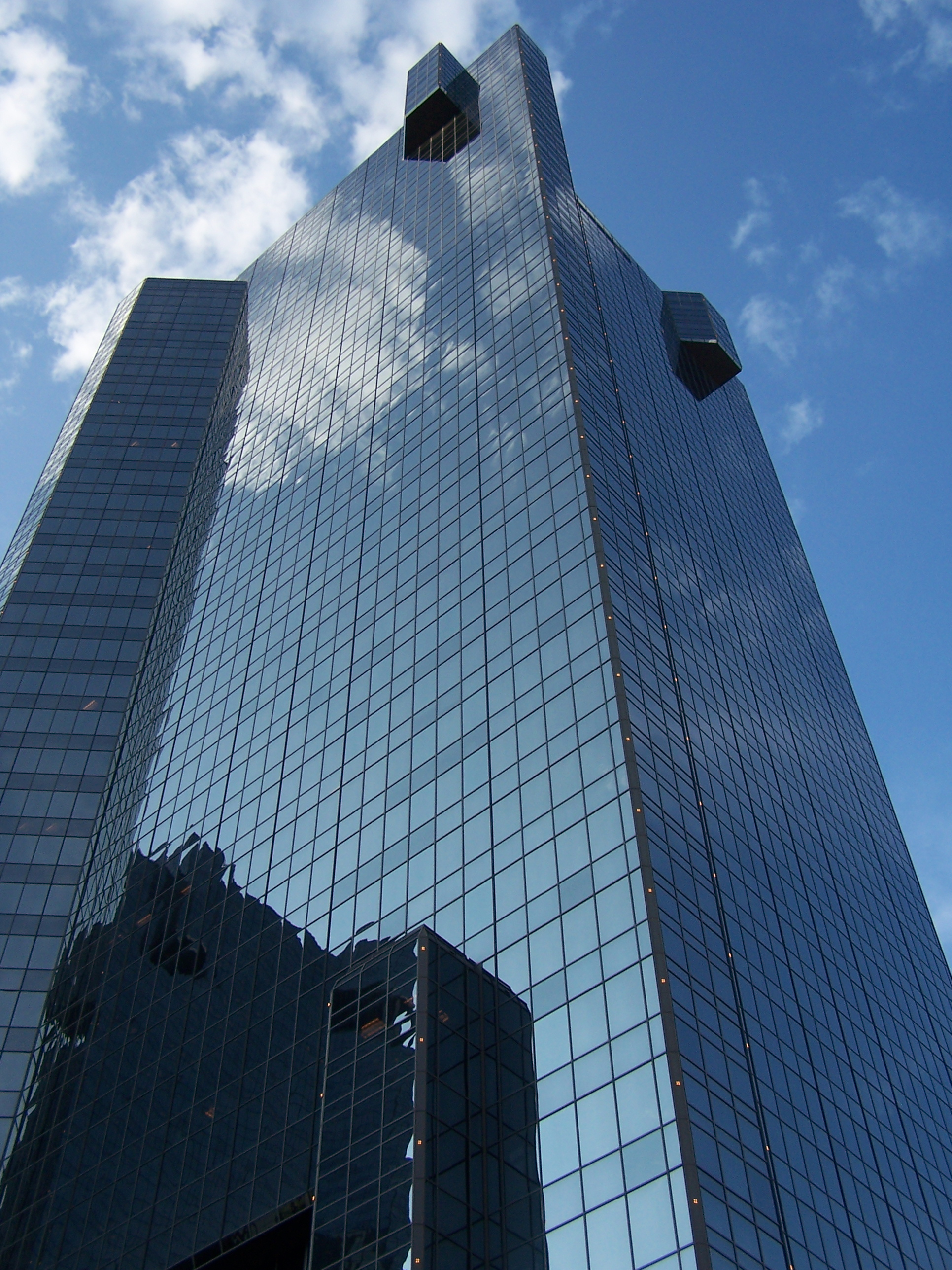
- Bank of America Tower in 2006

General information
- Status: Completed
- Type: Office
- Architectural style: Modernism
- Location: 301 Commerce Street; Fort Worth, Texas
- Completed: 1984

Height
- Height: 546.75 ft

Technical details
- Floor count: 38
- Floor area: 820,501 sq ft (76,227.0 m^{2})

Design and construction
- Architect: Paul Rudolph

Bank of America Tower (previously known as D. R. Horton Tower) is a building in Fort Worth, Texas, United States. At 547 feet (167 meters), it is the second tallest building in Fort Worth. It has 38 floors. It was completed in 1984. It is surrounded by Calhoun Street, East 2nd Street, Commerce Street, and East 3rd Street. It is the taller of the two towers in the City Center Towers Complex. The two buildings are similar in that they resemble pinwheels, but they are not true twins. The building was formerly the headquarters of D. R. Horton, a home construction company, and it is now primarily occupied by Bank of America.

== See also ==
- List of tallest buildings in Fort Worth
