= The Tower (Fort Worth, Texas) =

Residential high-rise building in Fort Worth Texas

Coordinates: 32.753243°N 97.332935°W

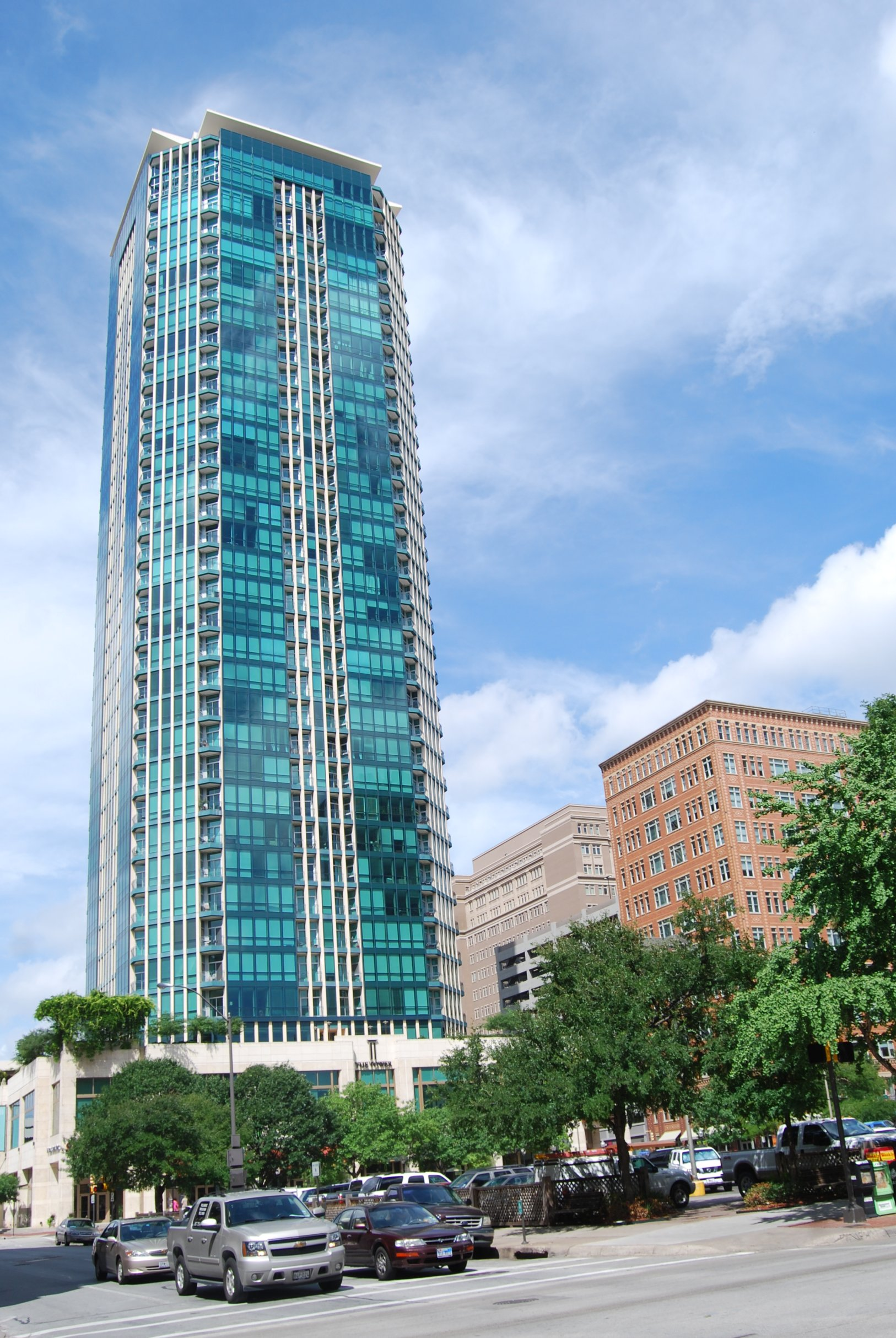
- The Tower, Fort Worth
- Interactive map of the The Tower area
- Former names: Block 82 Tower, Bank One Tower, Team Bank Tower, Texas American Bank Tower, Fort Worth National Bank Tower

General information
- Type: High-Rise Condominium, Office (Formerly)
- Architectural style: postmodernist
- Location: 500 Throckmorton Street, Fort Worth, Texas, United States
- Groundbreaking: 1969
- Topped-out: April 26, 1973
- Completed: 1974
- Opened: April 1974
- Renovated: January 2004–2005

Height
- Height: 488 ft (149 m)

Technical details
- Floor count: 35

Design and construction
- Architect: John C. Portman Jr.
- Architecture firm: John Portman & Associates International, Inc.

Renovating team
- Architect: Corgan Associates

The Tower (formerly Block 82 Tower and Bank One Tower) is a 35-story building located in downtown Fort Worth, Texas bound by Taylor Street, Throckmorton Street, West 4th Street, and West 5th Street. At 488-feet (149 m), it is the fourth tallest building in Fort Worth. When it was completed in 1974, it was the tallest building in Fort Worth until the completion of the Burnett Plaza in 1983. On March 28, 2000, this tower was severely damaged by an F3 tornado; consensus was nearly reached to demolish the tower, but it was instead converted into the tallest residential building in the city.

== History and construction ==
Construction for the original tower broke ground in 1969, topped out on April 26, 1973, and was completed in 1974. The building site is located on 500 Throckmorton Street in Fort Worth, and originally opened in 1974 as the Fort Worth National Bank Tower; designed by architect John C. Portman Jr. for the Fort Worth National Bank, who also was the architect for the Renaissance Center in Detroit, Michigan and Westin Peachtree Plaza Hotel in Atlanta, Georgia. The design consisted of an octagonal tower design and octagonal sloping base with a glass facade, it was 454-feet tall (138 m) and was 35-stories. When it first opened in 1974, it was the tallest building in Fort Worth surpassing the 420-foot (130 m) Landmark Tower which opened in 1957. The building was eventually bought out by Bank One, and was also sold to a real estate investment company Loutex Inc.

During its opening, the side of the building had the Calder's Eagle, the sculpture was eventually moved out of Fort Worth and relocated to the Seattle Art Museum for $10,000,000. The Reata Restaurant was included on the top floor of the building.

== Tornado damage, potential demolition and conversion ==
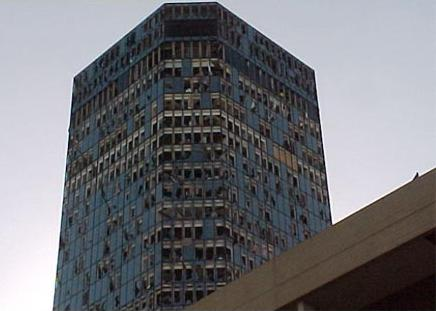
Damage of Bank One Tower in March 2000 after tornado

On the evening of March 28, 2000, the building was severely damaged by an F3 tornado that struck downtown Fort Worth. 80 percent of the building's windows were blown out and cracked, leaving shattered glass on surrounding streets. Office materials such as chairs also fell onto the streets and vehicles below, and damage on the building was seen from miles around the city of Fort Worth. Black mold was reported in the interiors and rooms of the building, interior walls had deteriorated, and live wires hung from the collapsed ceiling over sprinkler-flooded office floors. After the severe damage of the building from the F3 tornado, the building’s windows were cladded with plywood panels. The Reata Restaurant on the top floor reopened six weeks after the damage from the March 28, 2000 tornado, until closure on February 23, 2001.

On February 26, 2001, the building was closed to the public for removal of asbestos and interior demolition. Due to the severity of the damage, workers and city officials were uncertain for the building’s future. The building was nearly demolished during interior demolition and asbestos removal. As demolition began on the interior of the building, it was halted due to high costs. This was due to the amount of asbestos in the original construction of the building. By March 2001, the building was scheduled for demolition by implosion, which would have made it the 5th tallest building in the world to be demolished. Businessman and financier Ed Bass' partnership bought the property in March 2001 for $3.8 million, intending to demolish the building by implosion and replace the former site with a parking lot.

By late 2001, plans to demolish the building grew concerning, due to the amount of asbestos in the building, risk of health concerns, and the building being close to the neighboring 20-block district Sundance Square. In early 2002, Bass had put demolition plans on hold fearing a fire hazard would occur from the rotting plywood panels on the buildings windows and demanded that the plywood sheet panels be replaced with metal panels. The cost was nearly $1,000,000 for the building’s planned demolition.

On February 4, 2003, real estate investors and developers announced plans to convert the building into an apartment condominium. On October 21, 2003, the new name for the building and the new design were unveiled. Construction on the conversion, renovation, redesigning and heightening of the building began from January 2004 to 2005. Conversion and renovation was completed in 2005, and was repurposed into a luxury apartment high-rise condominium. A new glass facade was installed on the tower and a 60,000-square-foot (5,600 m^{2}) concrete square base was constructed around the existing octagonal sloping glass base.

A new concrete building roof top was built to house new air conditioning systems for the structure. The rooftop addition added 34 feet (10 m) to the height of The Tower, bringing its total height to 488 feet (149 m), and the 4th tallest building in the city. The building reopened to the public in 2005 as residential tenants moved in during March 2005. Retail tenants began opening in the base of the building in September 2005.

== Public displays of art at the tower ==
In 2019, artist Donald Martiny created an artwork called Hugin + Munin (named as a reference to Huginn and Muninn) in the Lobby of the Tower. The commissioned work is 14 by 17 feet and had to be created directly at the Lobby.

== See also ==
- List of tallest buildings in Fort Worth

Records
Preceded by Landmark Tower	Tallest building in Fort Worth; 454 feet (138 m); 1974-1982	Succeeded by Wells Fargo Tower
