= List of tallest buildings in Fort Worth =

Skyline of Fort Worth
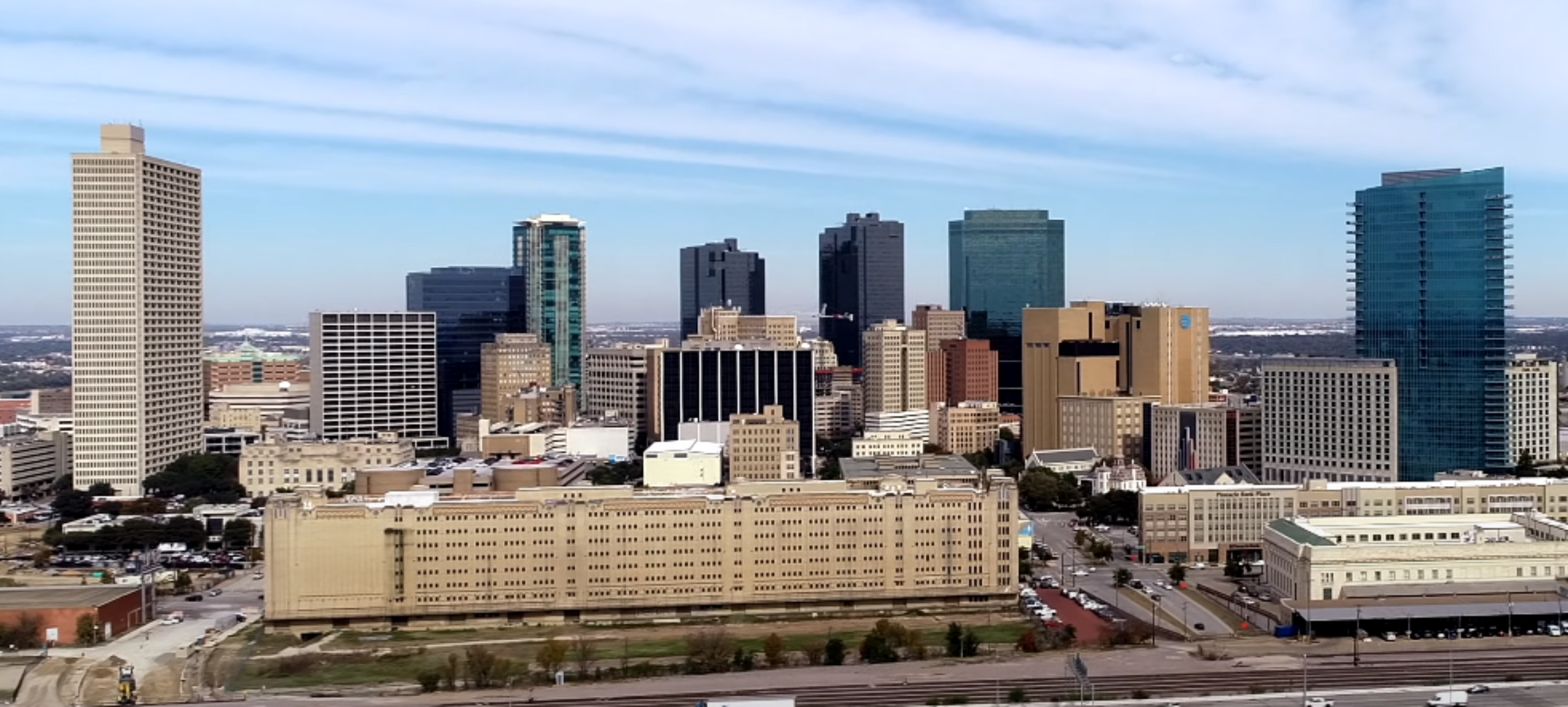
- Downtown Fort Worth in 2020
- Tallest building: Burnett Plaza (1983)
- Tallest building height: 567 ft (172.9 m)
- First 150 m+ building: Burnett Plaza

Number of tall buildings (2026)
- Taller than 100 m (328 ft): 7
- Taller than 150 m (492 ft): 3

Number of tall buildings — feet
- Taller than 200 ft (61.0 m): 25
- Taller than 300 ft (91.4 m): 11

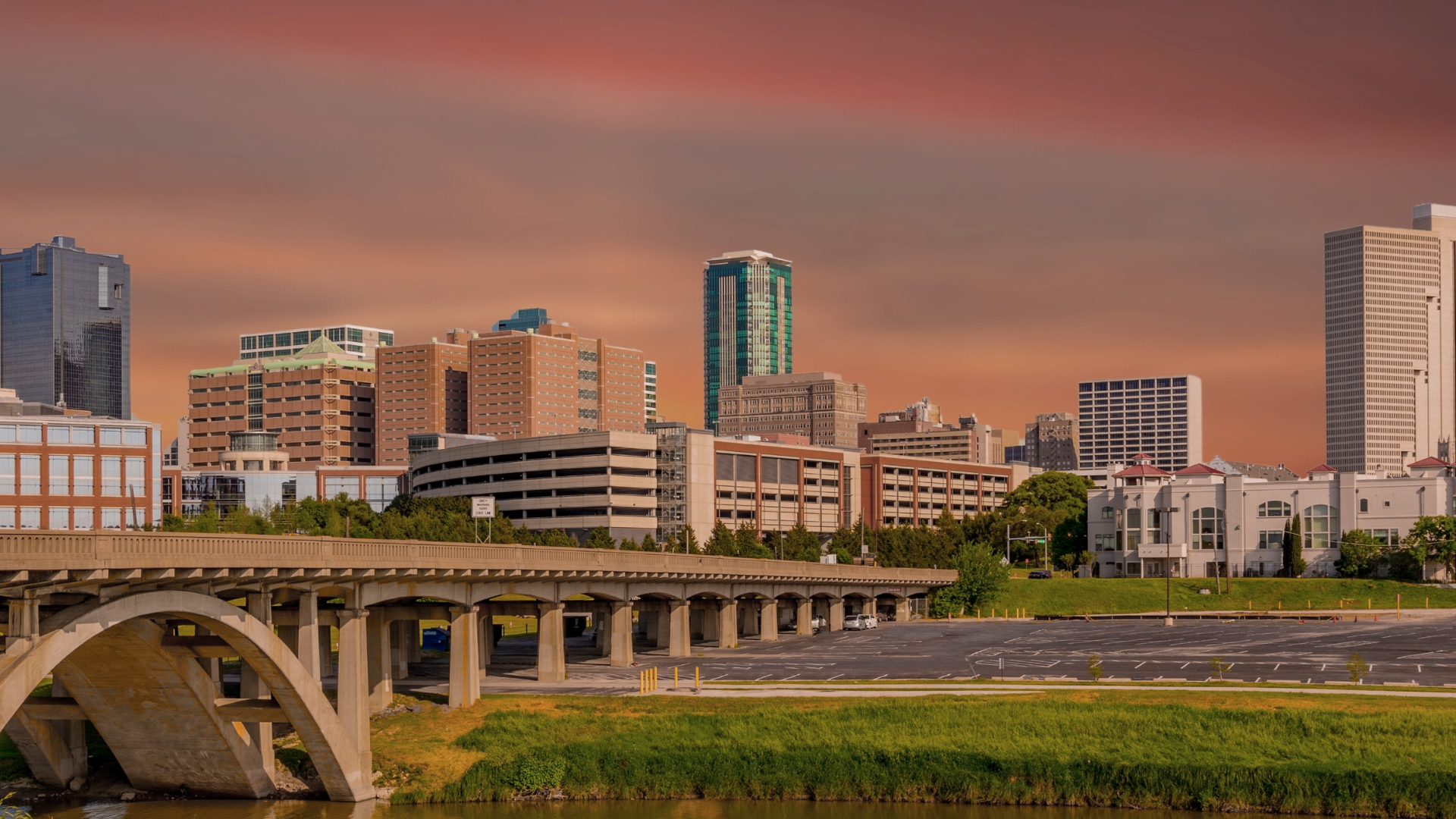
Downtown Fort Worth at sunset in 2023

Fort Worth is the fourth-most populous city in the U.S. state of Texas and the second largest city in the Dallas–Fort Worth metroplex. The city is home to over 60 high-rises, 25 of which stand taller than 200 feet (61 m) as of 2026. 11 buildings reach a height of over 300 ft (91 m). The tallest building in the city is the 40-story Burnett Plaza, which rises 567 feet (173 m) in Downtown Fort Worth and was completed in 1983. The second-tallest skyscraper in the city is the Bank of America Tower (known until 2017 as the D.R. Horton Tower), which rises 547 feet (167 m). Fort Worth has the fourth-most skyscrapers taller than 492 ft (150 m) in Texas, after Houston, Dallas, and Austin, with three such buildings. However, none of the buildings in Fort Worth are among the 30 tallest buildings in Texas. Fort Worth's tallest buildings are concentrated in downtown, especially in the Sundance Square district. Downtown Fort Worth is north of Interstate 30 and south of Trinity River.

The history of skyscrapers in Fort Worth began with the completion of the 7-story Flatiron Building in 1907. When built, it was the tallest building in North Texas. The Flatiron Building stood as Fort Worth's tallest structure until 1910, with the construction of the 10-story Baker Building (since renamed the Bob R. Simpson Building). Fort Worth went through a major growth in skyscrapers during the 1920s, with the Farmers and Mechanics National Bank building (since renamed 714 Main) emerging as the tallest in the city. Other notable Art Deco high-rises during this period include the W. T. Waggoner Building and the Electric Building.

The Farmers and Mechanics building remained the tallest in Fort Worth until 1957, when the 30-story Landmark Tower was completed. From the early 1970s to the mid-1980s, Fort Worth went through the largest construction boom in the city's history. All three of its tallest skyscrapers were completed between 1983 and 1984, including the 40-floor Burnett Plaza, which became the city's tallest building. The Burnett Plaza has remained the tallest structure in the city to date. A tornado in 2000 damaged numerous skyscrapers, leading to a height increase for The Fort Worth Tower following repairs, and the demolition of the Landmark Tower, then the city's sixth-tallest building. The tallest building constructed in the 21st century in Fort Worth thus far is the Omni Fort Worth Hotel, currently the sixth-tallest building in the city.

== History ==
Number of buildings by height in Fort Worth by the end of each year, based on the information in this article. This takes into account three demolished buildings. Click on the legend to toggle a specific height on or off. View chart definition.

== Map of tallest buildings ==
The map below shows the location of buildings taller than 200 ft (61 m) in Fort Worth, all of which are in the city's downtown. Each marker is numbered by the building's height rank, and colored by the decade of its completion.

Buildings taller than 200 ft (61 m) in Fort Worth.
- 1950s and before
- 1960s
- 1970s
- 1980s
- 1990s
- 2000s
- 2010s
- 2020s
1 Burnett Plaza
2 Bank of America Tower
3 777 Main Street
4 The Fort Worth Tower
5 Wells Fargo Tower
6 Omni Fort Worth Hotel
7 Frost Bank Tower
8 Fort Worth City Hall
9 Deco 969
10 714 Main
11 Bank of America Center
12 AT&T Building
13 W. T. Waggoner Building
14 Blackstone Hotel
15 Star-Telegram Building
16 City Place Tower Two
17 Fritz G. Lanham Federal Building
18 City Place Tower One
19 River Tower
20 The Carnegie
21 Oncor Building
22 Electric Building
23 Petroleum Building
24 Sinclair Building
25 Tarrant County Corrections Center

== Cityscape ==
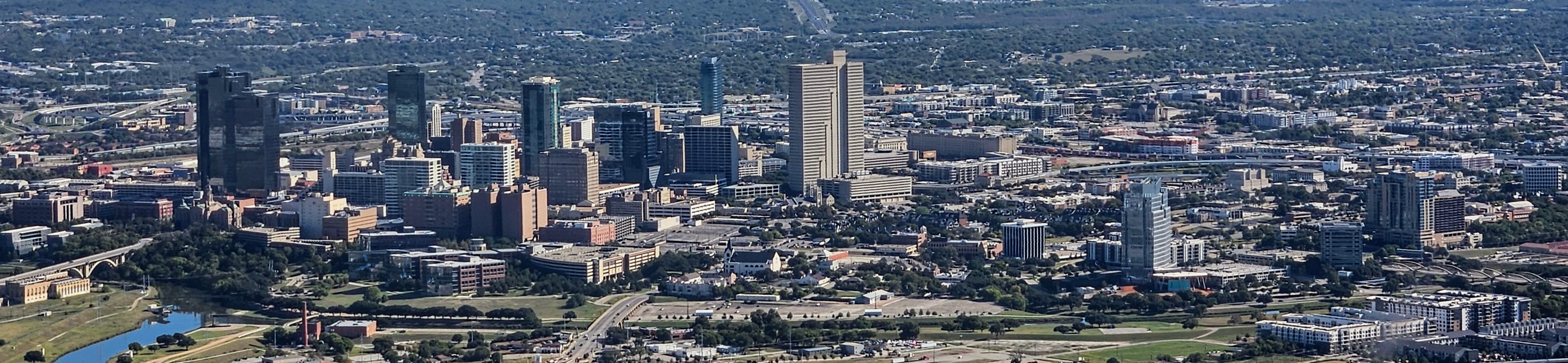
An aerial view of Downtown Fort Worth in 2025

== Tallest buildings ==
This list ranks completed buildings in Fort Worth that stand at least 200 feet (61 m) tall, based on standard height measurement. This includes spires and architectural details but does not include antenna masts. The "Year" column indicates the year in which a building was completed. Freestanding observation towers, while not habitable buildings, are included for comparison purposes but not ranked. Buildings tied in height are sorted by year of completion with earlier buildings ranked first, and then alphabetically.

Was the tallest building in Fort Worth upon completion

Rank	Name	Image	Location	Height ft (m)	Floors	Year	Purpose	Notes
1	Burnett Plaza		32°45′01″N 97°20′04″W	567 (172.9)	40	1983	Office	Tallest building in Fort Worth and in Texas outside of Houston, Dallas, or Austin. Tallest building completed in Fort Worth in the 1980s. Built on the site of the demolished Medical Arts Building. Also known as First United Tower.
2	Bank of America Tower		32°45′22″N 97°19′50″W	547 (166.7)	38	1984	Office	Designed as a "twin" of the Wells Fargo Tower, and is the taller of the two structures. Formerly known as the D.R. Horton Tower. Also known as City Center Tower II.
3	777 Main Street		32°45′11″N 97°19′47″W	525 (160)	40	1983	Office	Built on the site of the Aviation Building. Formerly known as the Carter + Burgess Plaza (2000–12), UPR Plaza (1998–2000), and the Continental Plaza (1998).
4	The Fort Worth Tower		32°45′12″N 97°19′58″W	488 (148.7)	35	1974	Residential	Tallest residential building in Fort Worth. Also known as The Tower and Block 82 Tower. The building was originally built to a height of 454 feet (138 m) in 1974, and was the tallest building in Fort Worth from 1974 to 1982, when it was overtaken by Wells Fargo Tower. Following damage from the 2000 Fort Worth tornado, it was redesigned and renovated, with its height increased to 488 ft (149 m) when it reopened in 2005. Tallest building completed in Fort Worth in the 1970s.
5	Wells Fargo Tower		32°45′23″N 97°19′55″W	477 (145.4)	33	1982	Office	Tallest building in Fort Worth briefly from 1982 to 1983. Designed as a "twin" of the Bank of America Tower. Shorter of the two structures. Also known as the Chase Texas Tower and the City Center Tower I.
6	Omni Fort Worth Hotel		32°44′54″N 97°19′43″W	447 (136.3)	33	2009	Mixed-use	Mixed-use residential and hotel building. Tallest building in Fort Worth completed in the 2000s and in the 21st century. Tallest mixed-use building in Fort Worth. Originally planned to be between 15-21 stories high.
7	Frost Bank Tower	—	32°45′09″N 97°20′00″W	369 (112.5)	25	2018	Mixed-use	Mixed-use office and residential building. Tallest building completed in Fort Worth in the 2010s.
8	Fort Worth City Hall		32°45′11″N 97°20′37″W	324 (98.8)	20	2004	Government	Was built by Pier 1 Imports and known simply as Pier 1 World Headquarters. Purchased by Chesapeake Energy and renamed the Chesapeake Plaza in 2008, but bought back by Pier 1 and renamed again in 2014. Sold in 2021 to the City of Fort Worth, with renovations to the new city hall completed in 2024.
9	Deco 969	—	32°45′08″N 97°19′41″W	315 (96)	27	2024	Residential	Tallest building completed in Fort Worth in the 2020s. Also known as 901 Commerce.
10	714 Main		32°45′10″N 97°19′49″W	307 (93.6)	24	1921	Hotel	Tallest building in Fort Worth from 1921 to 1957. Listed on the National Register of Historic Places. Also known as the Transport Life Building and the Continental Life Insurance Building.
11	Bank of America Center		32°45′05″N 97°20′01″W	300 (91.4)	21	1962	Office	Also known as 500 West 7th, First on 7th, and the First National Bank Building.
12	AT&T Building		32°45′00″N 97°19′46″W	295 (89.9)	17	1958	Office	Tallest building completed in Fort Worth in the 1950s. Tallest building in Fort Worth with a spire. Also known as the Southwestern Bell Telephone Building.
13	W. T. Waggoner Building		32°45′06″N 97°19′50″W	270 (82.3)	20	1920	Hotel	Tallest building in Fort Worth briefly from 1920 to 1921. Originally built as an office building. Opened as the Sandman Signature Fort Worth Downtown Hotel in 2023. Tallest building in Fort Worth prior to 714 Main. Listed on the National Register of Historic Places.
14	Blackstone Hotel		32°45′14″N 97°19′49″W	268 (81.7)	20	1929	Hotel	Redesigned in 1999 after being abandoned for over a decade. Also known as the Courtyard Fort Worth Downtown.
15	Star-Telegram Building		32°45′06″N 97°19′54″W	260 (79.3)	19	1930	Office	Partially built into neighboring Oil and Gas Building. Also known as the Commerce Building, Service Life Center, and the Fair Store Building.
16	City Place Tower Two		32°45′21″N 97°20′05″W	258 (78.6)	20	1978	Office	Tallest structure of the Charles D. Tandy Center. Also known as the South Tower and Two Tandy Center.
17	Fritz G. Lanham Federal Building	–	32°45′02″N 97°19′54″W	250 (76.2)	14	1968	Government	
18	City Place Tower One		32°45′16″N 97°20′01″W	247 (75.3)	19	1976	Office	Shorter structure of the Charles D. Tandy Center. Also known as the North Tower and One Tandy Center.
19	River Tower	—	32°44′59″N 97°20′38″W	240 (73.2)	23	2017	Residential	Part of Trinity Terrace, a senior living community.
20	The Carnegie	—	32°45′13″N 97°20′03″W	236 (71.9)	16	2008	Office	
21	Oncor Building		32°45′08″N 97°19′49″W	234 (71.3)	16	1952	Office	Also known as the Electric Service Building and the Fort Worth National Bank Building.
22	Electric Building		32°45′05″N 97°19′58″W	229 (69.8)	15	1929	Residential	Renovated and redesigned in 1996. Listed on the National Register of Historic Places.
23	Petroleum Building		32°45′10″N 97°19′54″W	226 (69)	14	1927	Office	Renovated and redesigned in 1969. Listed on the National Register of Historic Places. Also known as the Executive Plaza, Rattikin Title Building, and Life of American Building.
24	Sinclair Building		32°45′14″N 97°19′52″W	215 (65.5)	17	1930	Hotel	Renovated and redesigned in 1990. Converted into a hotel in 2019. Listed on the National Register of Historic Places. Originally known as the Dulaney Building.
N/A	Pioneer Tower		32°44′46″N 97°21′59″W	212 (65)	1	1936	Monument	Tallest structure in Fort Worth outside of downtown. Also known as the Will Rogers Memorial Tower. Not an inhabitable building; included for comparison purposes.
25	Tarrant County Corrections Center		32°45′21″N 97°20′12″W	203 (61.9)	15	1990	Government	Tallest prison structure in the city.

== Tallest under construction or proposed ==
=== Under construction ===
As of 2026, there are no buildings planned to be taller than 200 ft (61 m) that are under construction in Fort Worth. The most recent building constructed taller than that height is Deco 969, which was completed in 2024.

=== Proposed ===
As of 2026, there are no approved or proposed buildings planned to be taller than 200 ft (61 m) in Fort Worth.

== Tallest demolished ==
This table lists buildings that once stood taller than 200 ft (61 m) in Fort Worth, based on standard height measurement, that have since been demolished.

Rank	Name	Image	Height ft (m)	Floors	Year completed	Year demolished	Purpose	Notes
1	Landmark Tower		380 (115.8)	30	1957	2006	Office	Tallest building in Fort Worth from 1957 to 1974, prior to The Fort Worth Tower. At one point had a 40-foot-tall (12 meter) clock added to its top, which held the record for world's largest revolving clock. Damaged beyond repair by the 2000 Fort Worth tornado outbreak. At the time of destruction, it was the tallest building in Texas to be demolished and 15th tallest destroyed building in the United States. Formerly also known as the Texas Building and Continental National Bank Building. Replaced by the Cowtown Place parking garage in 2017.
2	Medical Arts Building	—	281 (85.7)	19	1927	1973	Office	Former location now occupied by Burnett Plaza.
3	Aviation Building	—	200 (61)	16	1930	1978	Office	Site now occupied by 777 Main Street. Formerly also known as the Commercial Standard Insurance Building and Transport Life Building.

== Timeline of tallest buildings ==
This list shows chronologically the buildings that held the title of tallest building in Fort Worth.

Name	Image	Street address	Years as tallest	Height ft (m)	Floors	Reference
Tarrant County Courthouse		100 East Weatherford Street	1895–1920	194 (59)	5	
W. T. Waggoner Building		810 Houston Street	1920–1921	230 (70)	20	
714 Main		714 Main Street	1921–1957	307 (94)	16	
Landmark Tower		200 West 7th Street	1957-1974	380 (116)	30	
The Fort Worth Tower		500 Throckmorton Street	1974-1982	454 (138)	35	
Wells Fargo Tower		201 Main Street	1982-1983	477 (145)	33	
Burnett Plaza		801 Cherry Street	1983–present	567 (173)	40	

== See also ==
- List of tallest buildings in Texas
- List of tallest buildings in Amarillo
- List of tallest buildings in Austin
- List of tallest buildings in Corpus Christi
- List of tallest buildings in Dallas
- List of tallest buildings in El Paso
- List of tallest buildings in Houston
- List of tallest buildings in Lubbock
