= W. T. Waggoner Building =

Skyscraper in Fort Worth, Texas USA

- U.S. National Register of Historic Places
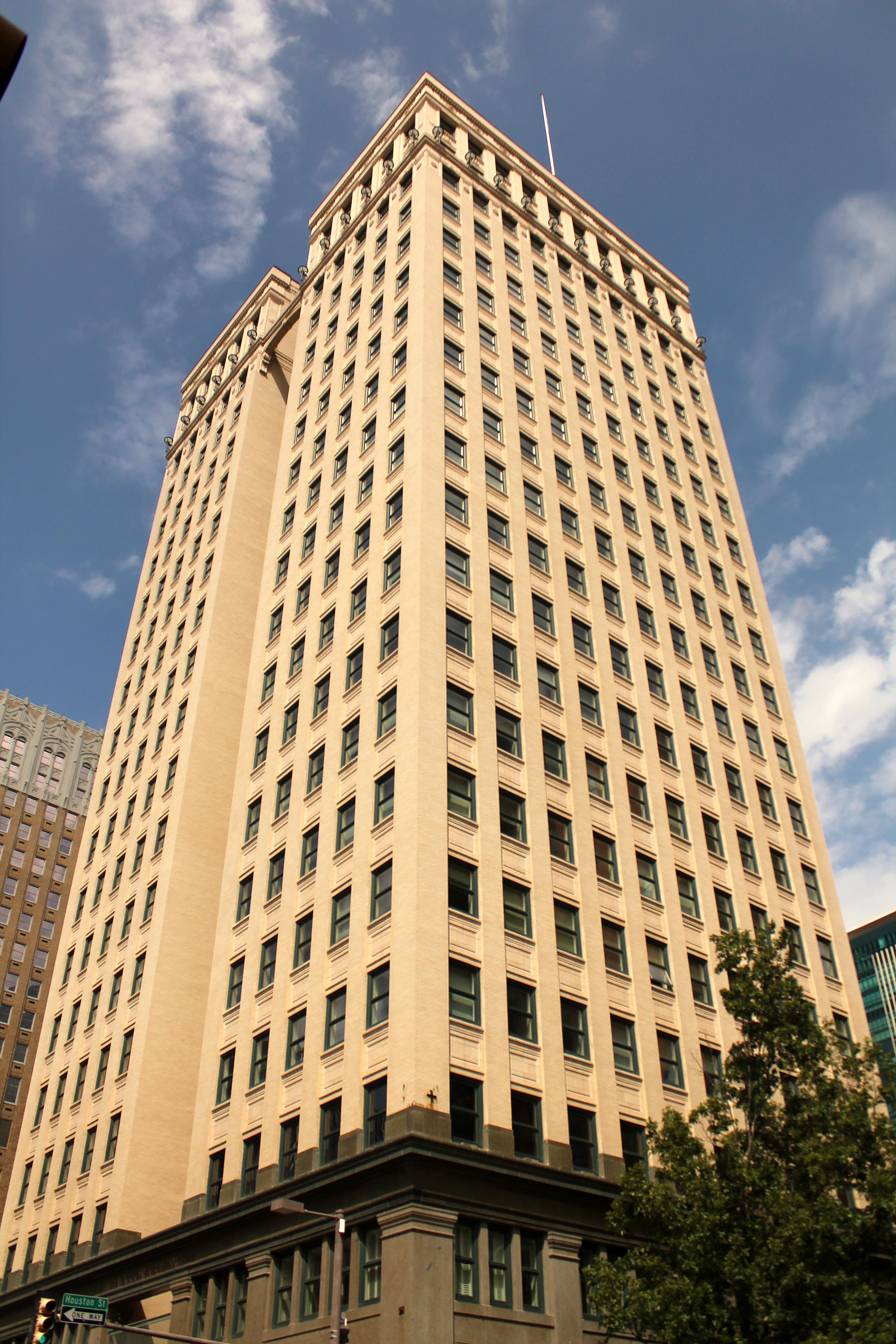
- W. T. Waggoner Building in 2014

- Location within Texas Location within the United States
- Location: 810 Houston St., Fort Worth, Texas
- Coordinates: 32°45′05″N 97°19′49″W
- Area: less than one acre
- Built: 1919
- Architect: Sanguinet & Staats
- Architectural style: Chicago, Skyscraper
- NRHP reference No.: 79003012
- Added to NRHP: July 10, 1979

The W. T. Waggoner Building is a historical skyscraper in Fort Worth, Texas.

== Location ==
It is located at 810 Houston Street in Fort Worth, Tarrant County, Texas.

== History ==
The skyscraper was built from 1919 to 1920 for William Thomas Waggoner, the owner of the Waggoner Ranch and of the Waggoner Refinery. It is 230 feet high, with twenty floors. It was designed by the architectural team Sanguinet & Staats. It cost US$1,500,000.

From 1920 to 1957, Continental National Bank had an office in the building. The building was owned by XTO Energy until the fall 2018 when it was acquired by Northland Developments to be remodeled and converted into a Sandman Signature Hotel. The 2018 remodel included keeping the heritage elements including the facade and building profile, while upgrading the mechanical components including the elevators, fire alarm and sprinkler systems, HVAC, Electrical Systems the emergency egress.

It was previously renovated in 1985., prior to the renovations of 2018. It officially opened as a Sandman Signature Hotel in April 2023.

== Heritage significance ==
It has been listed on the National Register of Historic Places since July 10, 1979.

== Explosion ==
A natural gas explosion extensively damaged the hotel at approximately 3:30PM. CST on Monday, January 8, 2024. 21 people were injured.

== See also ==
- National Register of Historic Places listings in Tarrant County, Texas

Records
Preceded by Tarrant County Courthouse	Tallest building in Fort Worth; 230 feet (70 m); 1920-1921	Succeeded by 714 Main
