= Aviation Building (Fort Worth) =

Aviation (Trans-American Life) Building
- Interactive map of the Aviation (Trans-American Life) Building area

General information
- Architectural style: Zigzag Moderne
- Location: Fort Worth, Texas, Northwest corner Main and Seventh Streets
- Coordinates: 32.752843°N 97.329889°W
- Demolished: 1978

Height
- Height: 275 feet

Technical details
- Floor count: 16

The Aviation Building was a Zigzag Moderne skyscraper located at the heart of downtown Fort Worth from 1930 to 1978. Designed by Herman P. Koeppe of the Wyatt C. Hedrick Architectural Firm, the 16 floor, 275 foot tower served the growing aviation concerns of Fort Worth before providing office space for several insurance groups. In 1978, the Aviation Building was demolished to make way for the construction of the Transwestern Building (now Carter Burgess Plaza).

== History ==
Fort Worth experienced a boom in construction at the end of the 1920s leading to the creation of several Art Deco skyscrapers downtown. In 1929, businessman A.P. Barrett commissioned the construction of an office tower to house the budding aviation interests in north Texas. Completed in the summer of 1930, the brown sandstone and grey granite Aviation building was decorated in polychromed panels bands and terra cotta accents typical of the Zigzag Moderne architectural styling that was in vogue at the time.

Of note was the Meso-American motifs present throughout the building. Barrett, an avid traveler and admirer of Mexican culture, charged chief designer Herman P. Koeppe with infusing the building with elements of southwestern Indian culture. Chief among these details were the use of geometric shapes throughout the interior and exterior of the tower and several Aztec prince sculptures with eagles that adorned the main entrance to the building, paying homage to both Barrett’s interests and his company, Southern Aeromotive Service, Inc.

Ownership of the Aviation Building was transferred from Barrett to Trinity Life Insurance in the 1930s. Over the subsequent decades, Commercial Standard Insurance Company and finally Trans-American Life Insurance took control of the building. In the 1970s ownership bounced between several groups until Continental National Bank purchased the property in 1978 as the site of a new bank. Demolition was completed on July 23.

== Aztec Statue Controversy ==
Prior to the demolition of the Aviation Building, a group of young preservationists and the department of Art and Art History at Texas Christian University secured the removal of the four Aztec statues that adorned the entrances to the building. In 1986, plans to restore and display the statues in a public venue were made, however, since their removal in 1978, the statues had gone missing and it is currently unclear as to their whereabouts. Surviving members of the rescue team reported in 2007 that they knew the statues had been successfully removed and transported away from the site but neither authorities at Texas Christian University nor the City of Fort Worth claim to know the location of the Aztec sculptures.
