= City Center Towers Complex =

Coordinates: 32.756°N 97.331°W

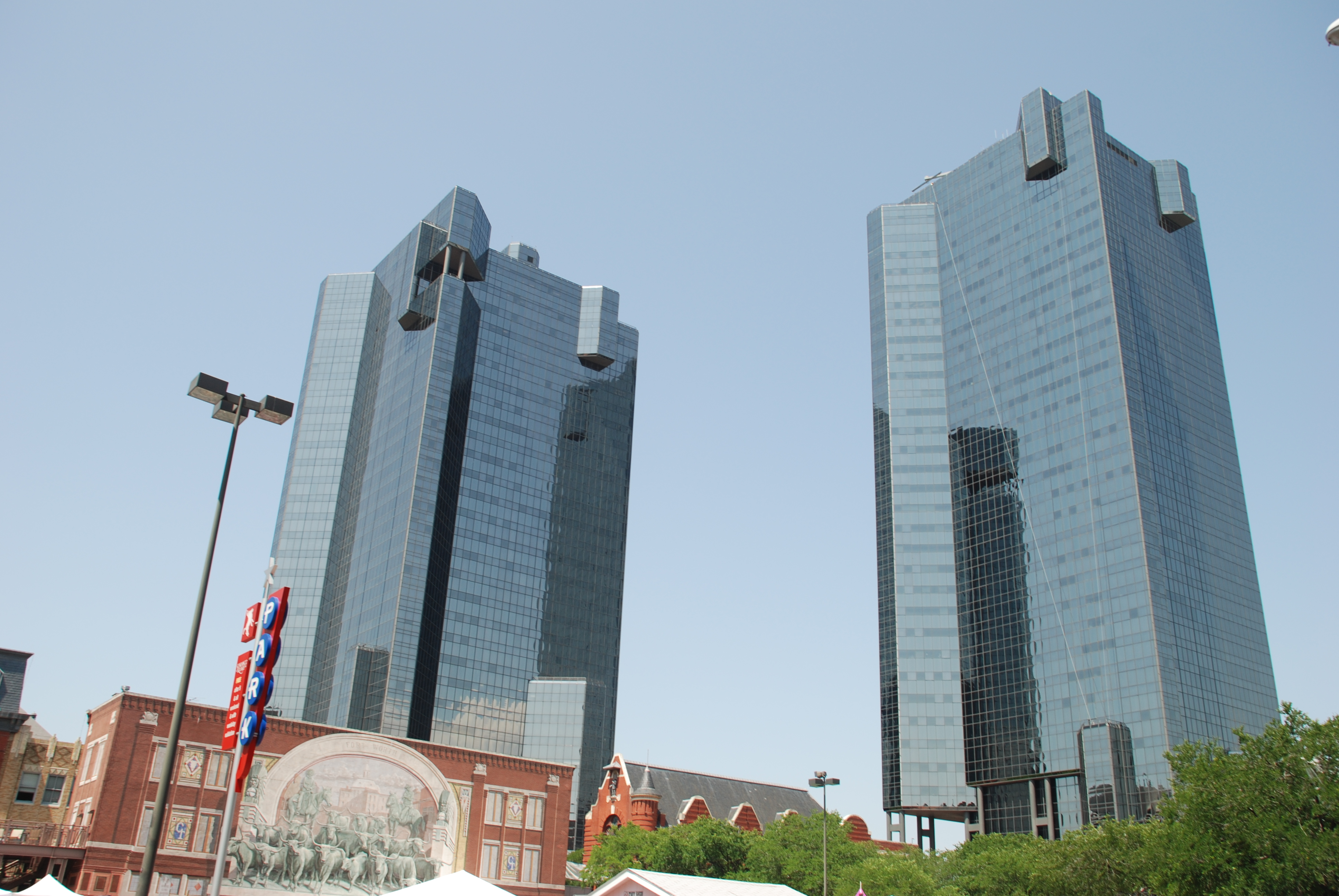
City Center Towers Complex

The City Center Towers Complex is located in Fort Worth, Texas, that comprises two towers. It was designed by noted architect Paul Rudolph.

== Bank of America Tower ==
At 547 feet (167 meters), Bank of America Tower (until 2017: D.R. Horton Tower) is the second tallest building in Fort Worth. It has 38 floors. It was completed in 1984. Its address is 301 Commerce Street. It is the taller of the two towers in the City Center Towers Complex. The two buildings resemble pinwheels but are not true twins.

== Wells Fargo Tower, Fort Worth ==
Wells Fargo Tower, Fort Worth is a building located in Fort Worth, Texas. At 477 feet (145 meters), it is Fort Worth's fifth tallest building. It has 33 floors. Its addresses are Commerce Street, East 1st street, East 2nd Street, and Main Street. It was completed in 1982. It was the tallest building in Fort Worth from 1982 until 1983 when the Burnett Plaza was completed. It is the shorter of the two towers in the City Center Towers Complex. The buildings resemble pinwheels but are not true twins.

== See also ==
- List of tallest buildings in Fort Worth
