= Sinclair Building (Fort Worth) =

Building in Fort Worth, Texas

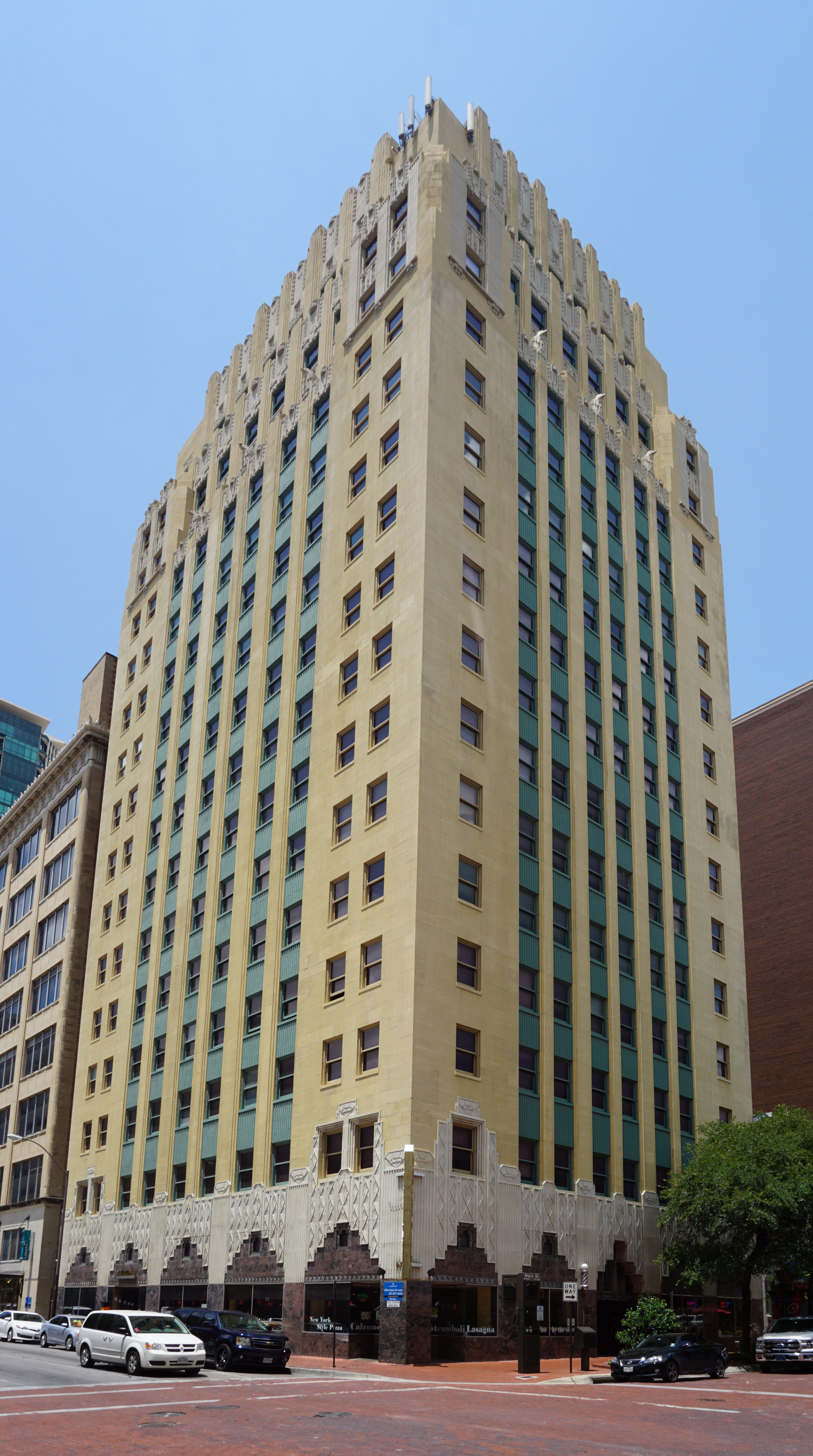
- Interactive map of the Sinclair Building area
- Former names: Dulaney Building

General information
- Architectural style: Zigzag Moderne
- Location: Fort Worth, Texas, United States, 512 Main Street
- Coordinates: 32.753687°N 97.330354°W
- Sinclair Building
- U.S. National Register of Historic Places
- Recorded Texas Historic Landmark
- NRHP reference No.: 91001913
- RTHL No.: 4709

Significant dates
- Added to NRHP: January 7, 1992
- Designated RTHL: 1992
- Opened: 1930

Technical details
- Floor count: 16

Design and construction
- Architect: Wiley G. Clarkson

The Sinclair Building (originally the Dulaney Building) is a Zigzag Moderne skyscraper in downtown Fort Worth, Texas. Located on the west corner of Fifth and Main street, the 200-foot-tall, sixteen-story tower neighbors fellow Art Deco landmarks the Kress Building and Blackstone Hotel. Opened in 1930, the Sinclair has served as office space for a variety of tenants over a number of renovations until 2013, when Sinclair Holdings Group purchased the building with the intention of converting the space into hotel rooms. Currently, the Sinclair operates as an upscale hotel under the Marriott company's Autograph Collection.

== History ==
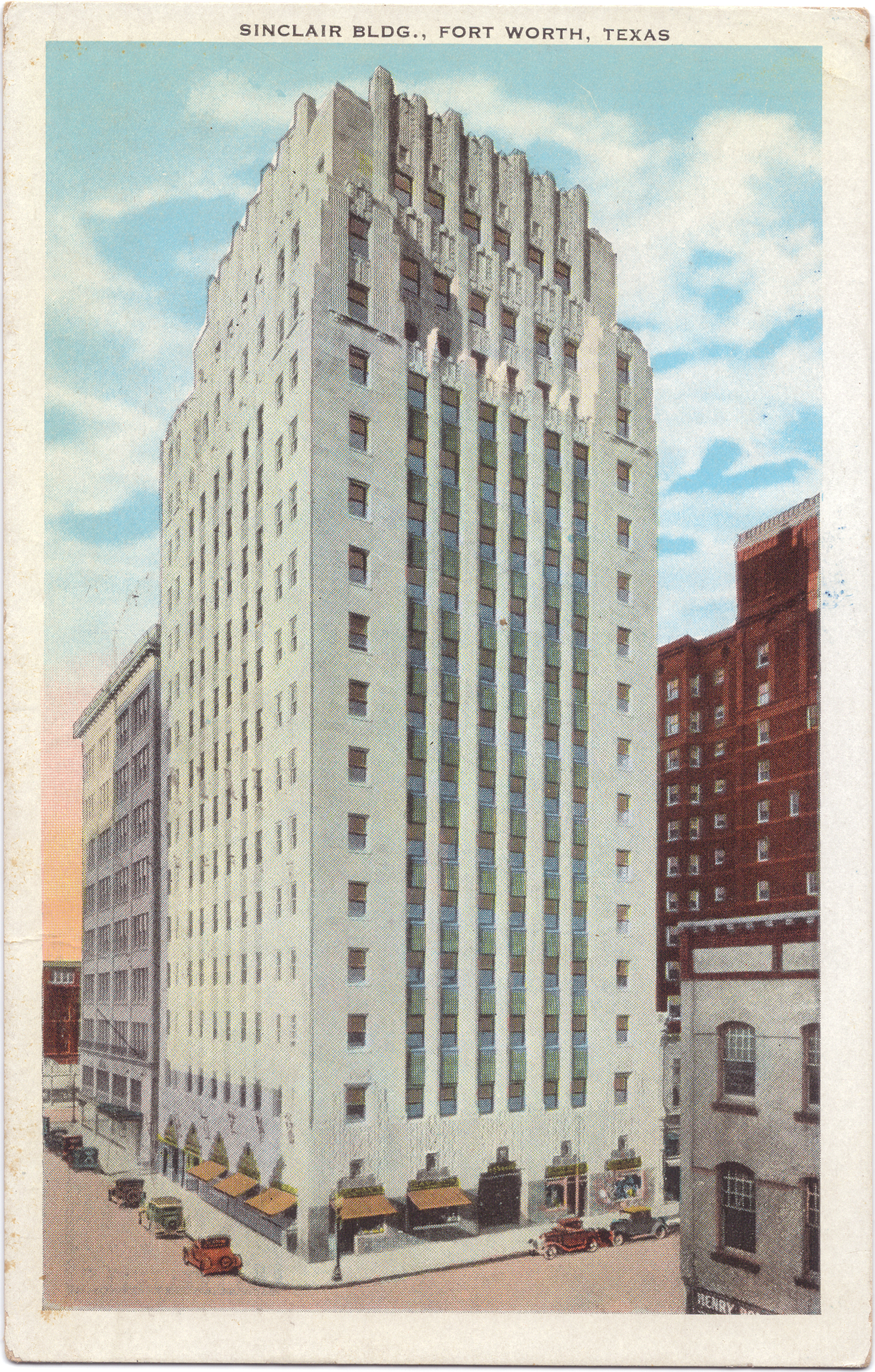
Postcard of the Sinclair Building, 1933

In 1929 Texas oilman and civic booster Richard Otto Dulaney announced plans for the construction of a million-dollar, modern structure to provide office space for the ever-expanding petroleum business. Dulaney won the property from lawyer, banker, and civic leader K. M. Van Zandt in a poker game. Dulaney razed the building located at 512 Main Street and erected the now Historic Sinclair Building. Designed by noted Fort Worth architect Wiley G. Clarkson, the building was meant to give the "impression of extreme verticality intended by the dark green spandrels sweeping upward" and employed Meso-American architectural motifs that had gained popularity throughout the United States in the 1920s.

Sinclair Oil Company, upon purchasing Dallas-based Pierce Petroleum Corporation, leased a majority of the building's 106,000 square feet before construction was completed in 1930 as space for offices supporting the marketing of Sinclair products across Texas, Oklahoma, Louisiana and Arkansas. Notable features advertised to prospective lessees included zoned air conditioning, high-speed automatic elevators, and integrated conduits for telephone and telegraph wiring.

By the late 1980s the Sinclair Building had fallen into a state of disrepair, passing between a handful of disinterested owners. However, rising rental costs outside of the city center and concentrated efforts to revitalize downtown created a renewed interest in the tower, with the Reaut Corporation purchasing the property in September 1988. Restoration of the Zigzag motif from archival material and the discovery of original fixtures behind previous renovation work allowed Reaut to return much of the building to the original design. By 1991 occupancy increased to three-fourth's capacity from a low of 18 percent in 1988. In 1992 the National Register of Historic Places designated the tower as historically significant. The Tarrant County Historical Commission dedicated a Texas Historical Marker for the Sinclair Building in 1993.

In 2013, investors operating under the name of Sinclair Holdings Group purchased the building with the intention of converting it into premium hotel space. The hotel opened in 2019 as part of Marriott's Autograph Collection. The renovation, done by Forrest Perkins and Merriman Architects, focused on retaining the building's Art Deco style while making the former oil company headquarters environmentally efficient. Keeping with the building's tradition of debuting cutting-edge technology, the renovated tower is the first hotel to have its interior electrical amenities, including lights, window shades and minibars powered exclusively over Ethernet (POE).

== See also ==
- List of tallest buildings in Fort Worth
- List of Recorded Texas Historic Landmarks (Sabine-Travis)
