= Preston Geren Sr. =

American architect

Preston M. Geren Sr.
- Born: Preston Murdoch Geren; November 2, 1891; Sherman, Texas, U.S.
- Died: September 21, 1969 (aged 77); Fort Worth, Texas, U.S.
- Education: Texas A&M University
- Occupations: Architect, engineer
- Years active: 1912–1969
- Spouse: Linda Giesecke (m. 1921)
- Children: 3, including Preston Geren Jr.
- Awards: Fellow of the American Society of Civil Engineers
- Practice: Sanguinet and Staats, Geren and Associates
- Buildings: Landmark Tower; Farrington Field; Arlington Heights High School

Preston Murdoch Geren Sr. (November 2, 1891 – September 21, 1969) was an American architect and engineer. Part of a prominent architectural family in Texas, he designed or served as associate architect for many of Fort Worth's most notable buildings constructed during his working life.

== Early life, military service and family ==
Geren was born in Sherman, Texas, in 1891. He received a degree in architectural engineering from the A&M College of Texas in 1912 and spent two years as supervising architect for the growing Texas A&M campus. From 1914 to 1916, he was a partner in the Austin firm of Giesecke and Geren, working with Texas A&M professor Frederick Giesecke. During World War I, Geren was commissioned as a first lieutenant in the United States Army Corps of Engineers and fought in the battles of Saint-Mihiel and the Argonne, where he was wounded. For his battlefield service, Geren received the Purple Heart and the Croix de Guerre. After the war, Geren served as chief engineer at an architectural firm in Austin. In 1921, Geren married Giesecke's daughter Linda; they had three children.

== Professional career ==
Between 1921 and 1923, Geren taught architecture and chaired the architecture department at Oklahoma A&M. He moved to Fort Worth in 1923 and joined the prominent firm of Sanguinet, Staats and Hedrick as chief engineer until 1934, when he founded his own practice, Preston M. Geren Architects and Engineers. At Sanguinet, Staats and Hedrick, Geren's projects included the Fort Worth Club, the Electric Building, the Texas and Pacific Passenger Terminal. In 1949, Geren's son Preston Jr. joined the practice.

At Geren and Associates, Geren was responsible for the design, construction, and remodeling of hundreds of civic, commercial, religious, and educational buildings in Texas. Geren was a member of the Texas Society of Architects as well as the American Institute of Architects, Fort Worth. He received the Distinguished Award of the city of Fort Worth twice. He received a certificate of merit from the Texas Construction Council in 1957. In 1956, he was named engineer of the year by the Texas Society of Professional Engineers. In 1959, he was elected as a fellow to the American Society of Civil Engineers. Geren also chaired the Fort Worth Zoning Board from 1940 to 1946.

Geren's work included various building projects at the Texas Wesleyan University, University of Texas at Arlington and Austin, Southwestern Baptist Theological Seminary, University of North Texas, the University of Dallas, Texas Woman's University and Texas Christian University. Geren's church projects included University Christian Church, Travis Avenue Baptist Church, Matthews Memorial Methodist Church, Ridglea United Methodist Church, and Ridglea Presbyterian Church, all in and around Fort Worth. Late in life, his firm was the local associate architect working with Louis Kahn on the Kimbell Art Museum. (This was a common practice in Fort Worth when dealing with out-of-town architects; Kahn had a reputation for significant time and cost overruns, while the Geren firm was known locally for bringing in projects on time and within budget.) Geren died in 1969, and his son completed the Kimbell Museum as associate architect.

== Significant works ==
Major works by Geren in Fort Worth included:

- Arlington Heights High School (1936)
- Farrington Field (1939)
- Parish house of St. Andrew's Episcopal Church (1949)
- Greater Southwest International Airport Terminal (1953, with Joseph R. Pelich)
- Colonial Country Club (1955, with John Floore)
- Landmark Tower (1957)
- Fort Worth Town Center (1962)
- Fort Worth Convention Center (1968)

Notable Geren projects in other Texas locales included:

- Little Chapel in the Woods (Denton, 1939, with O'Neil Ford and Arch B. Swank Jr.)
- Blackstone Building (Tyler, 1939)
- New London High School (New London, 1938)
- Welch Hall (Austin, 1959)
- Midland High School (Midland, 1961)
- Arlington Stadium (Arlington, 1965)

=== Gallery of projects ===
Notable projects by Preston M. Geren Sr.
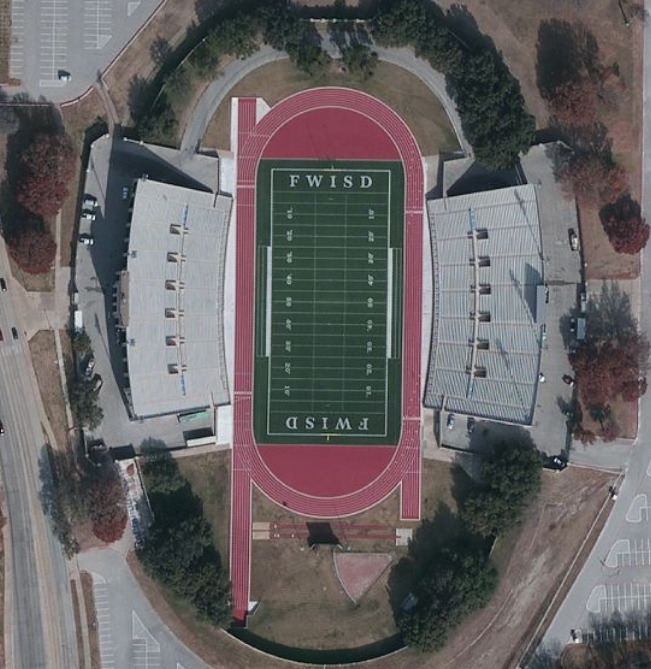
Farrington Field, Fort Worth

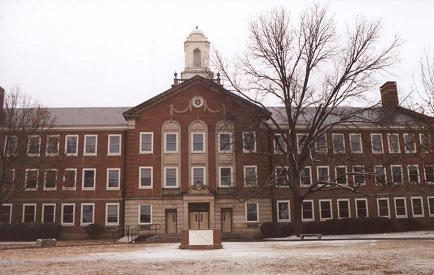
Arlington Heights High School, Fort Worth

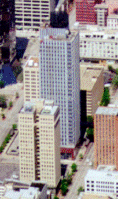
Landmark Tower, Fort Worth

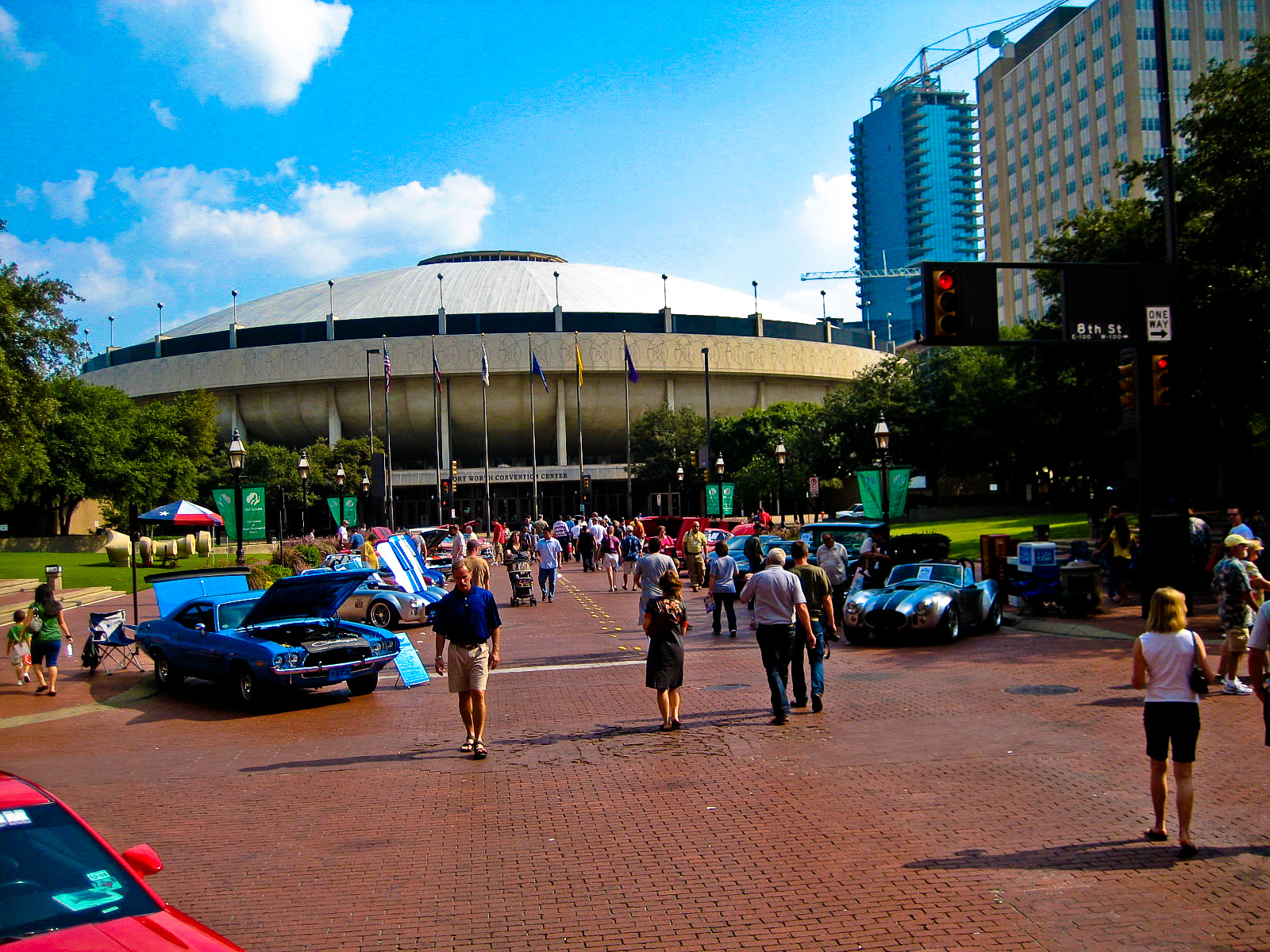
Fort Worth Convention Center

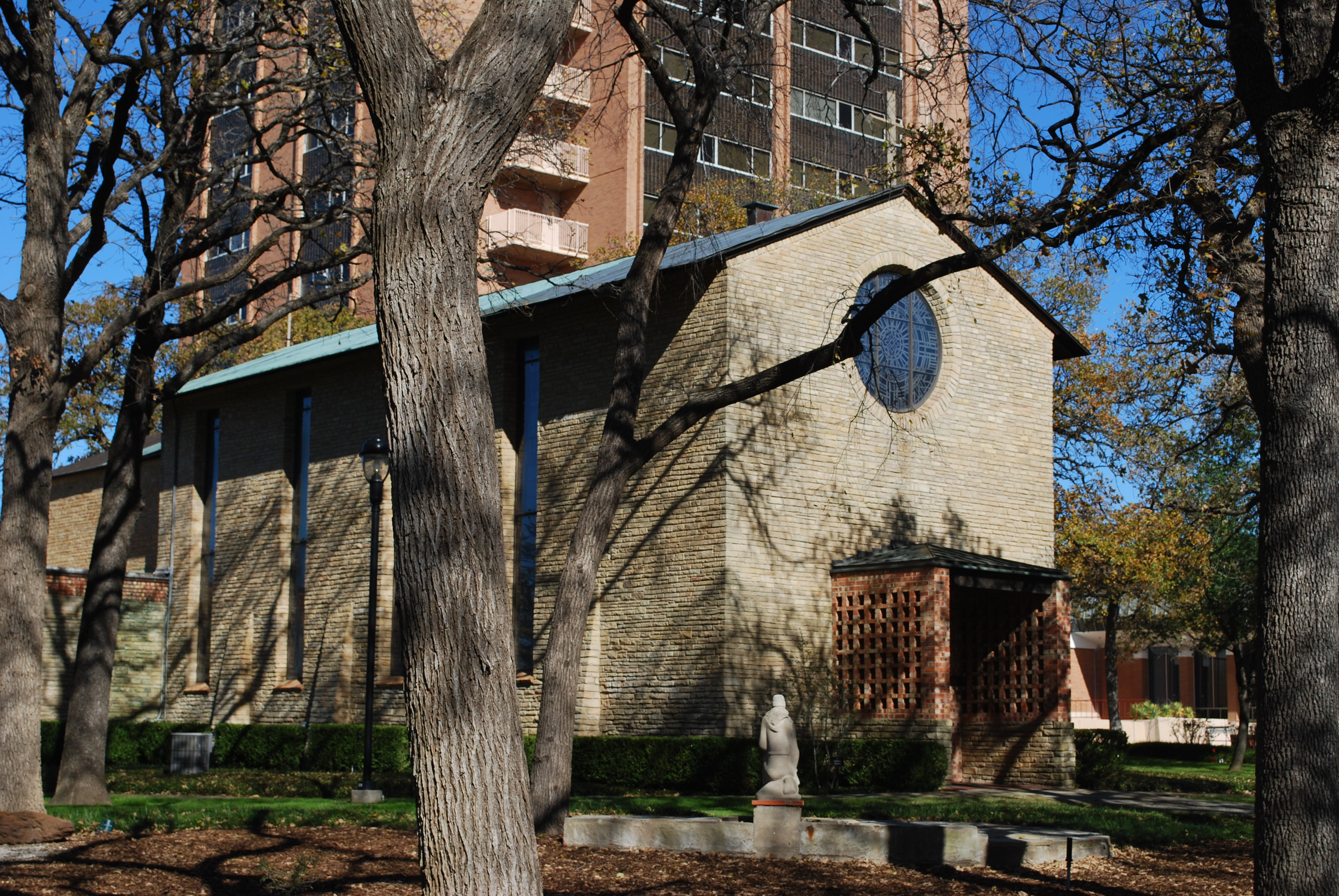
Little Chapel in the Woods, Denton

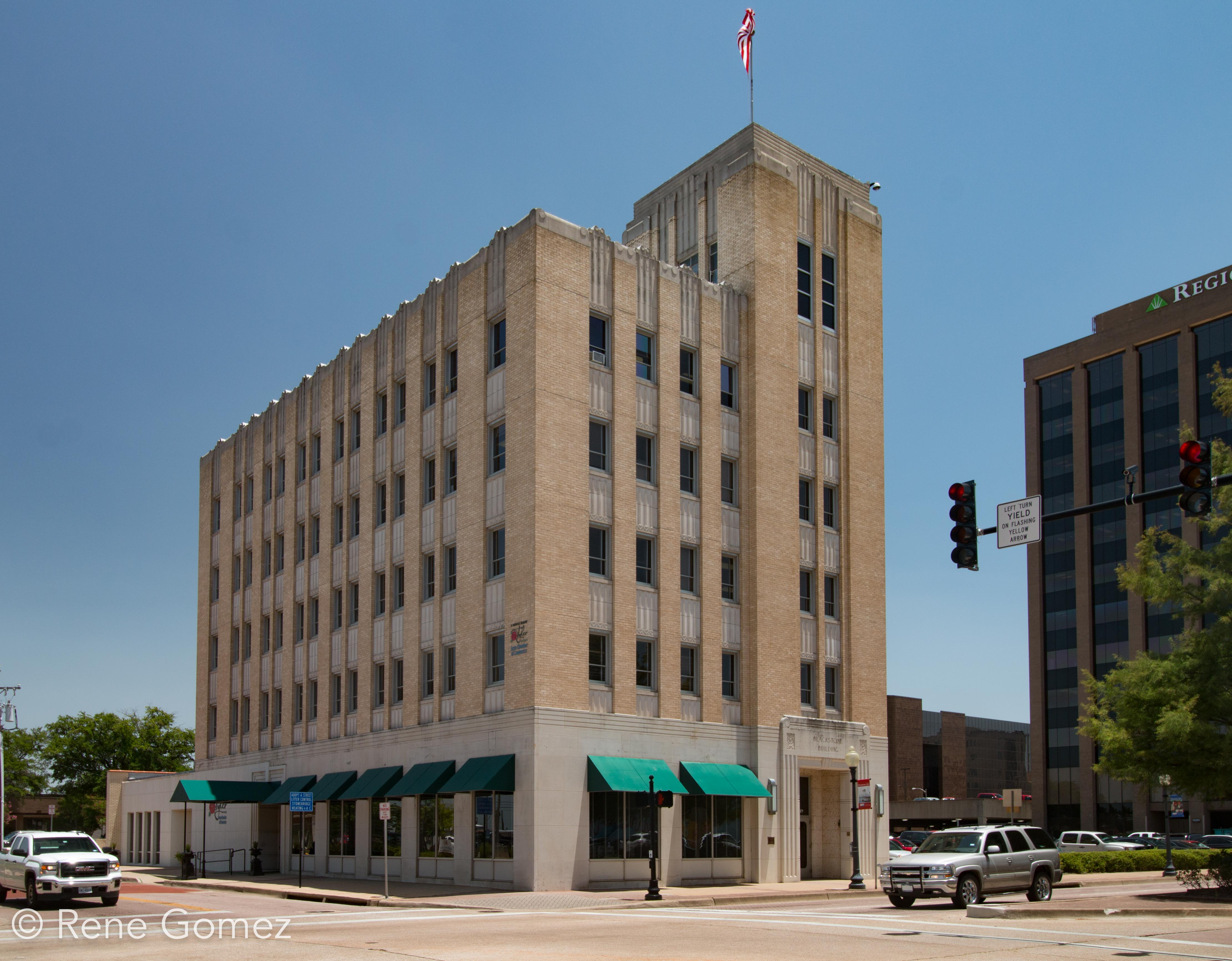
Blackstone Building, Tyler

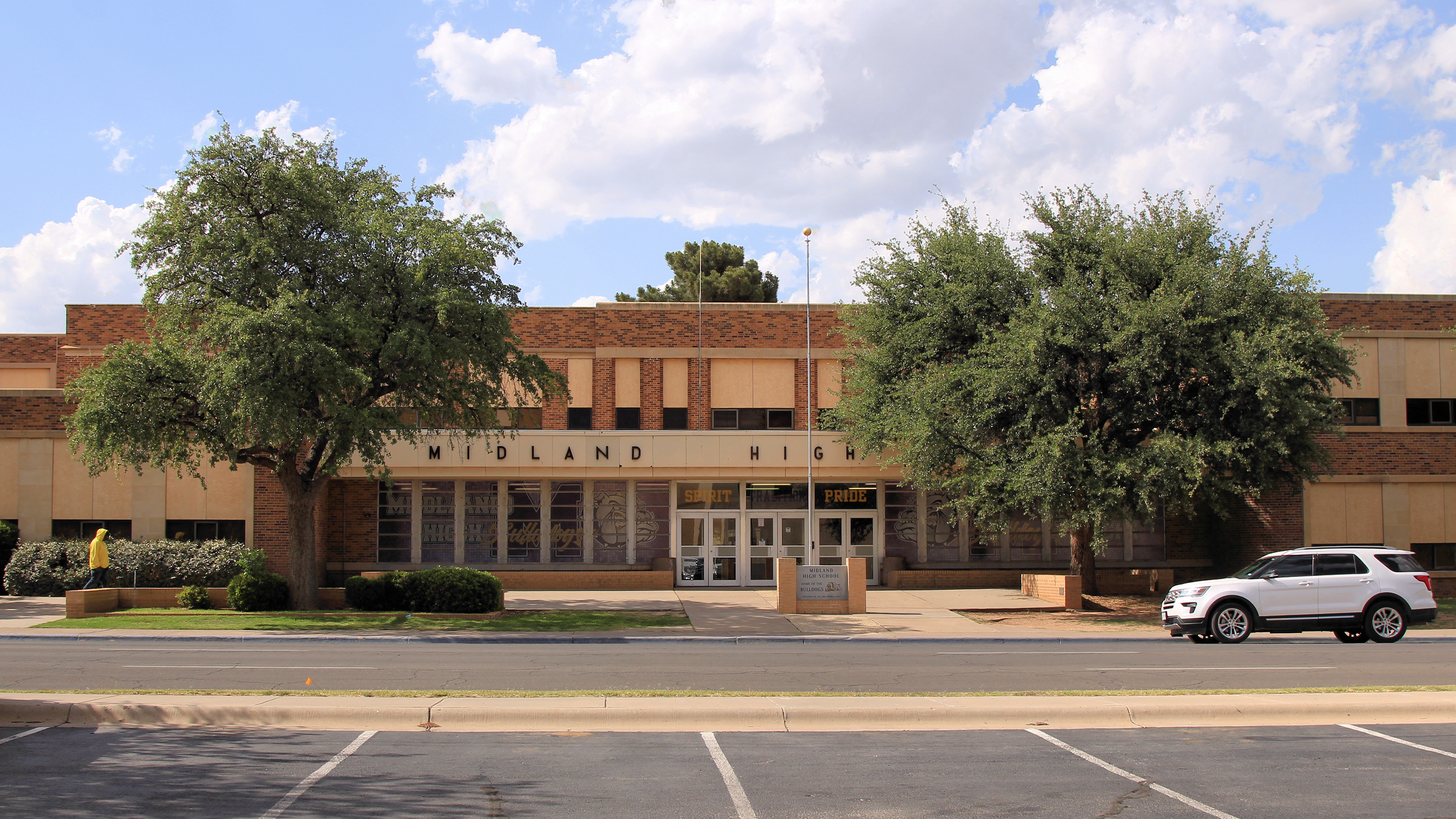
Midland High School, Midland

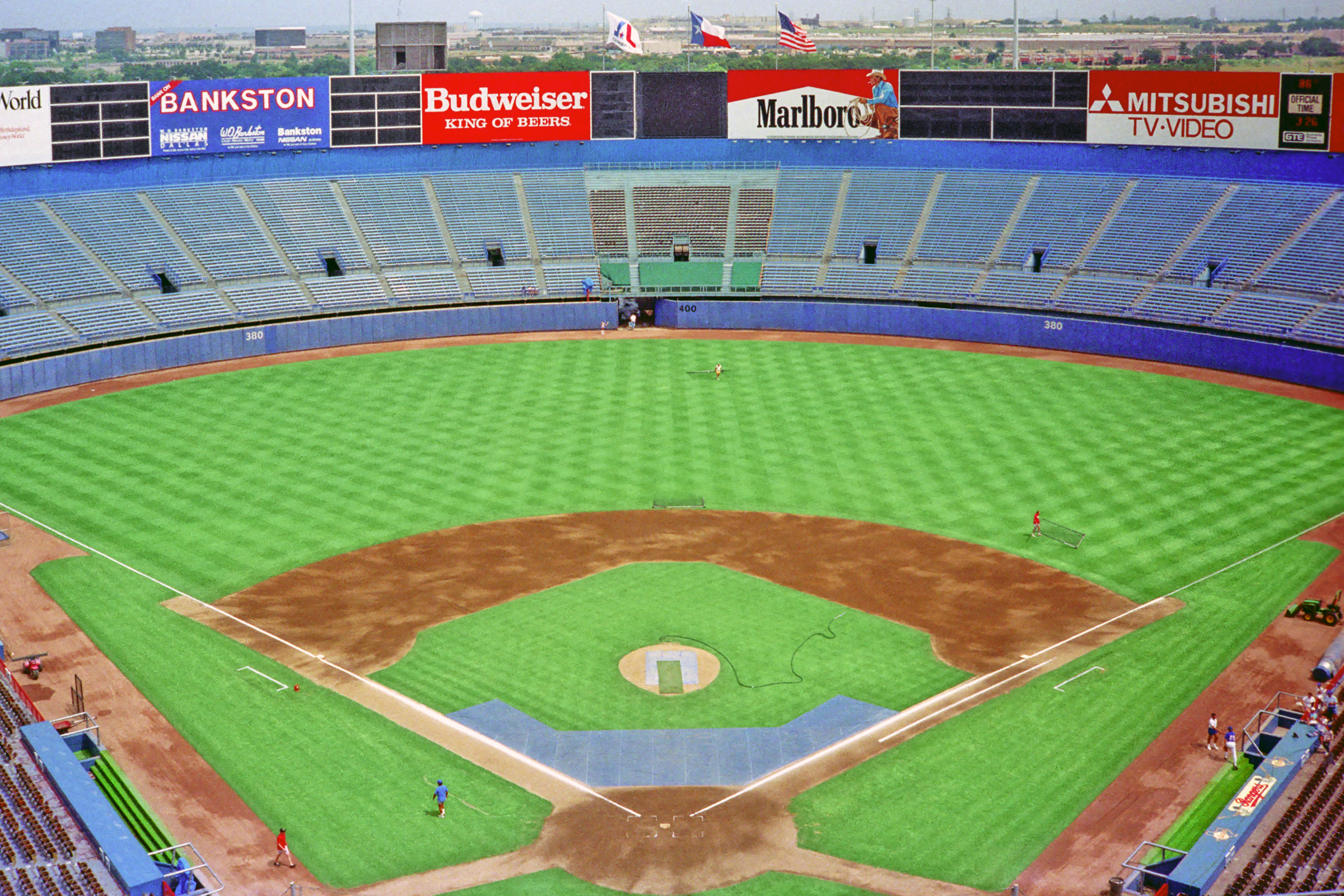
Arlington Stadium, Arlington
