= Donald Martiny =

American painter (born 1953)

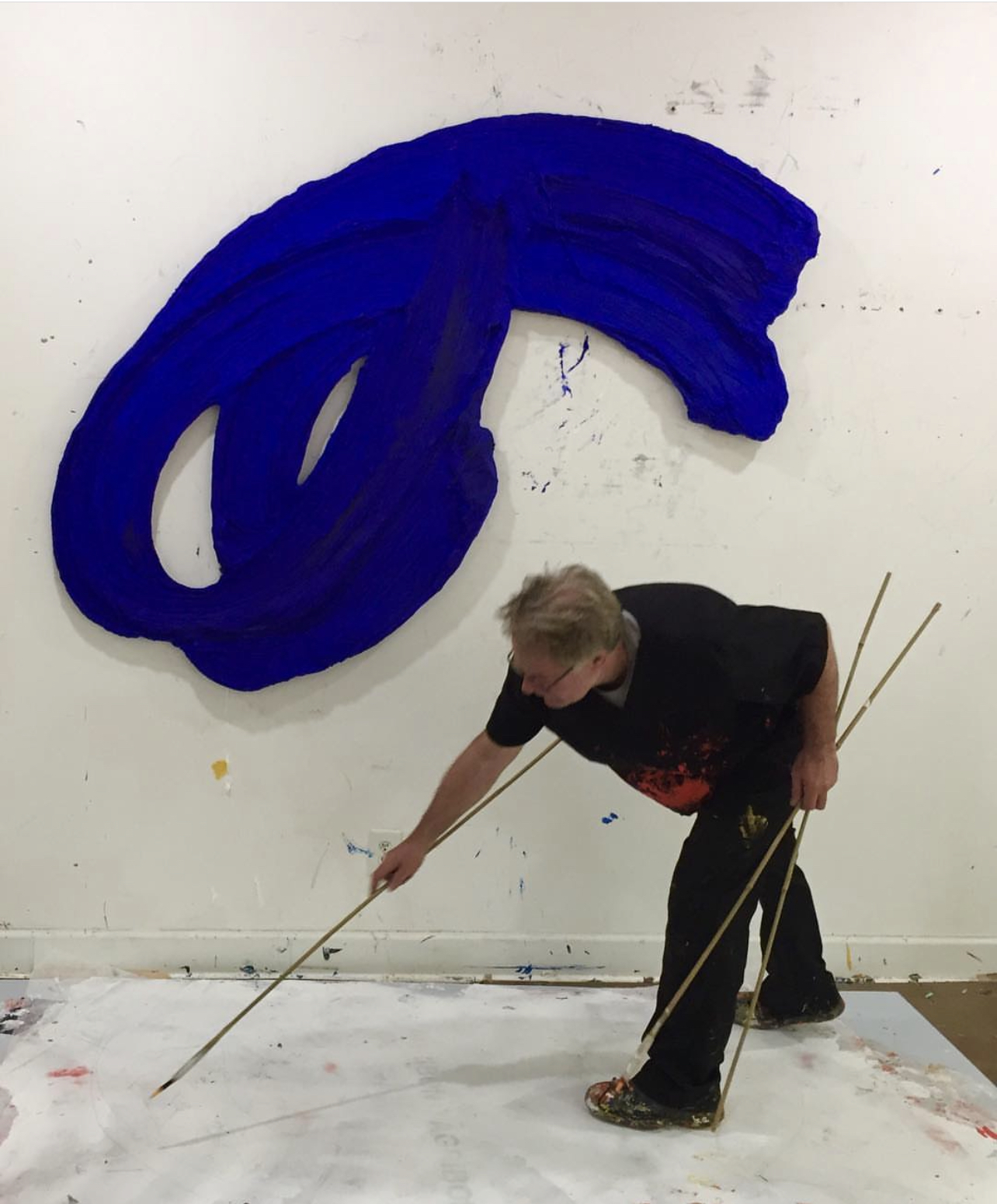
- Donald Martiny working in his studio
- Born: 1953 (age 72–73); Schenectady, New York, United States
- Education: Art Students League of New York; New York University; Pennsylvania Academy of the Fine Arts
- Known for: Painting
- Movement: Action painting, abstract expressionism
- Spouse: Celia Johnson
- Website: donaldmartiny.com

Donald Martiny (born 1953) is an American visual artist, known for sculptural paintings. His works are related to both action painting and abstract expressionism. He lives in Connecticut.

== Life ==
Donald Martiny was born in 1953, in Schenectady, New York.

Martiny studied from 1977 to 1980 at the School of Visual Arts in New York City; and from 1980 to 1983, he was a student at the Art Students League of New York. At the same time he attended courses on art at the New York University. From 2007 to 2009, Martiny continued his education at the Pennsylvania Academy of the Fine Arts.

In 2015 Martiny received a scholarship as an artist-in-residence of the Sam & Adele Golden Foundation for the Arts in New Berlin, New York, and was represented in the annual exhibition of the artists there. Also in 2015, Martiny was invited to produce two large works for the One World Trade Center, which are permanently exhibited there. Martiny has lectured at Cornell University and at the Ackland Art Museum. There, in 2016, he conducted a public discussion on the painter Hans Hoffmann in the context of an exhibition of his works.

== Work ==
In an interview, Martiny has been called a gestural abstractionist. This term refers to a method of how the painter applies color to an object: "The idea was that the artist would physically act out his inner impulses, and that something of his emotion or state of mind would be read by the viewer in the resulting paint marks." (Tate Galleries) This technique is also known as Action painting.

Martiny describes his work as follows: "My paintings are actual authentic gestures. These brushstrokes are very much me and I want to be present in the works as honestly and authentically as I can be. They are a record of my physicality at a specific point in time."

Martiny does not paint on canvases or rectangular backgrounds. His works show the immediately frozen brushstroke, as Martiny designed it in his movements. He had to experiment for years with the composition of the paint, which should be liquid enough to reproduce the brush stroke well and at the same time be so durable in a dry state that the work can be mounted on the wall without breaking. The finished work is reinforced by an aluminium plate cut to the exact dimensions of the brush stroke as a base. The paintings then look like a relief on the wall.

The paint Martiny uses consists of a mixture of water-based polymers enriched with pigments. Sometimes he stretches this mixture with so-called microbubbles, which ensure that the paint looks light.

In contrast to the working method of other artists of Action painting, Martinys works are not only spontaneous. He first creates a sketch in miniature and, if he likes it, he produces the work in ever larger dimensions. He always works on the floor because this situation gives him the greatest freedom in his brushstrokes. He makes his own brushes, and sometimes he also takes his hands to express all his current emotions in the work. Martiny on his works: "Brushstrokes are dances trapped in paintings".

In November 2022, Donald Martiny designed the set for a dance performance by Amy Hall Garner of the Paul Taylor Dance Company at the David H. Koch Theater at the Lincoln Center for the Performing Arts, titled Somewhere in the Middle: "Donald Martiny's set – hanging brushstroke pieces that show dimension through the thick, sometimes bumpy paint texture – changes in color and shape throughout the work, matching the liveliness of Mark Eric's bright costumes (briefs and bras overlaid with transparent fabric).

== Audio ==
- 2015: A Chapel Hill Artist Paints His Way Into The World Trade Center

== Collections ==
- Art collection of the One World Trade Center, New York City, United States
- Newcomb Art Museum, New Orleans, Louisiana, United States
- Amon Carter Museum of American Art, Fort Worth, Texas, United States

== Exhibitions ==
=== Solo exhibitions ===
- 2014: Donald Martiny: Freeing the Gesture, Fort Wayne Museum of Art, Fort Wayne, United States
- 2016: Donald Martiny, Pentimenti Gallery, Philadelphia, Pennsylvania, United States
- 2017: Donald Martiny New Works: The River Series, Diehl Gallery, Jackson, Wyoming, United States
- 2018: Donald Martiny: Pinselstriche, Galerie Klaus Braun, Stuttgart, Germany
- 2019: Donald Martiny: Freeing the Gesture, Historic City Hall Arts and Cultural Center, 1001 Ryan St., Lake Charles, Louisiana, United States
- 2019: Donald Martiny: Praxis and Poesta, Diehl Gallery, Jackson, Wyoming, United States

=== Group exhibitions ===
- 2013: Ice Water Flyswatter, Tiger Strikes Asteroid, Philadelphia, Pennsylvania, United States
- 2015: State of the Art – Art of the State, Cameron Art Museum, Wilmington, Delaware, United States
- 2015: Interact: Deconstructing Spectatorship: East Wing Biennial, The Courtauld Institute of Art, London, England
- 2016: Plastische Malerei: Pino Pinelli, Donald Martiny und Matthias Lutzeyer, Klaus Braun Galerie, Stuttgart, Germany
- 2016: Great & Small: A Holiday Miniature Show, Diehl Gallery, Jackson, Wyoming, United States
- 2016: 60 Americans, MakeShift Museum, Los Angeles, California, United States
- 2016: It’s All About the Hue, GreenHill Center for NC Art, Greensboro, North Carolina, United States
- 2017: The Enduring Reasons Why: Celebrating 25, Pentimenti Gallery, Philadelphia, Pennsylvania, United States
- 2017: Dialectical Praxis – Celia Johnson & Donald Martiny, Fred Giampietro Gallery, New Haven, Connecticut, United States
- 2017: State of the Art – Art of the State, Cameron Art Museum, Wilmington, Delaware, United States
- 2020: 2020 Front Burner: Highlights in Contemporary North Carolina Painting, North Carolina Museum of Art, Raleigh, North Carolina, United States
- 2021: Color Theory, Bentley Gallery, Phoenix, Arizona, United States

== Public art ==
- 2015: Two works in the One World Trade Center: Lenape (named after the Indian Tribe Lenape which used to populate large parts of today's states New York and New Jersey) and Unami (named after the now extinct language of Lenapes).
- 2019: Hugin + Munin (named as a reference to Huginn and Muninn in the Frost Tower Fort Worth, Fort Worth, Texas
