= Tarrant County Corrections Center =

Detention center in Texas, United States

Coordinates: 32.7558°N 97.3367°W

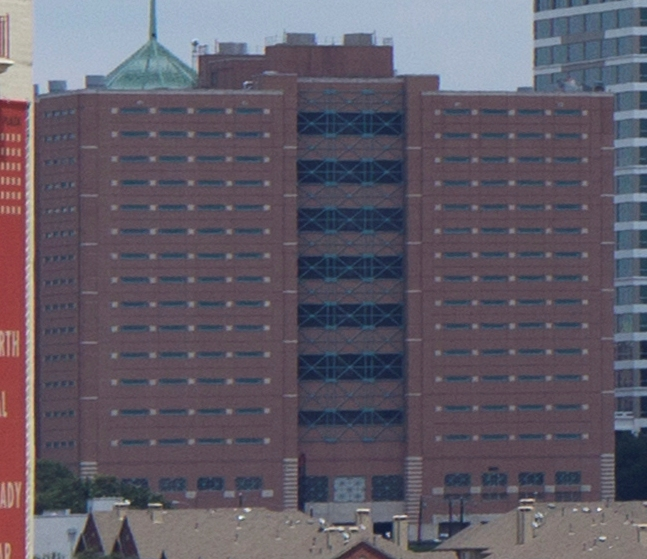
The back side of the Tarrant County Corrections Center

The Tarrant County Corrections Center (TCCC) is a detention center located in Downtown Fort Worth in Tarrant County, Texas, United States. Designed to house prisoners either awaiting trial, transfer or serving short jail sentences, the structure handles both male and female inmates. The jail was constructed in 1990 after several delays and became best known in 2000 when a religious education program run by its chaplain was challenged and declared unconstitutional. At 203 feet (62 m) in height, the center is one of the tallest buildings in Fort Worth and the largest prison structure in the city.

== History ==
The Tarrant County Corrections Center was constructed in 1990 because of overcrowding in nearby prisons. Completion of the prison was reportedly delayed by several causes, mainly issues with budgeting. Upon completion, the building was the first fully functional direct-supervision jail in Texas. Over 1,440 maximum-security prisoners were transferred from nearby facilities once the Corrections Center was opened, including female inmates. During its first few years, the facility was one of the best in the state; its warden reported that it had "not had one piece of graffiti written on the walls, one toilet stopped up, [or] one inmate struck or injured". A total of fifty dollars of a $20,000 budget was spent during the first year of operation, used for replacing two broken windows. The center's first incident occurred in 2005, when an inmate attacked two guards with an improvised shiv. The facility began suffering from overcrowding around 2010, so Fort Worth constructed a new jail, the Lon Evans Corrections Center, to handle more dangerous prisoners.

=== Chaplain's Education Unit ===
The Chaplain's Education Unit (CEU) was a religious educational program operated by the facility beginning in 1992. Originally a men's program, a women's branch was opened in 1993. The program, informally referred to as the "God Pod", was organized by the county sheriff and prison chaplain and run by a team of volunteers. It was designed to educate prisoners in Christian belief, based on the ideals believed by the sheriff and chaplain, which were meant to be "orthodox Christian principles". The program included up to 48 prisoners at a time, who were housed in a specialized area of the facility for a 120-day period. In 2000, two former prisoners and a local resident sued the Corrections Center, arguing that the program was a violation of religious freedom, since it allowed only for teaching of Christian principles. In 2001, the program was found to be unconstitutional, and was shut down.

== Facilities ==
Designed by the Dallas-based HOK Architects, the Corrections Center is 203 feet (62 m) tall and has thirteen floors, making it one of only twenty-one structures in Fort Worth greater than 200 feet (61 m) tall. The building is designed in a postmodernist style, using buff-colored bricks, with cast stone as trimming. There are four jail pods located on each corner of the structure, with an outdoor recreational facility located between the east and west parts. The center is located on Lamar Street, in an area near the center of Downtown Fort Worth, a location which has drawn criticism from some residents. The building has a skyway on the fifth floor connecting with the fourth floor of Lon Evans Corrections Center and an underground tunnel that connects to Lon Evans, the Tim Curry Justice Center, and the City/County Jail located at 350 West Belknap.

== See also ==
- Fort Worth Police Department
- List of Texas state prisons
