= Welch Hall (University of Texas at Austin) =

Robert A. Welch Hall
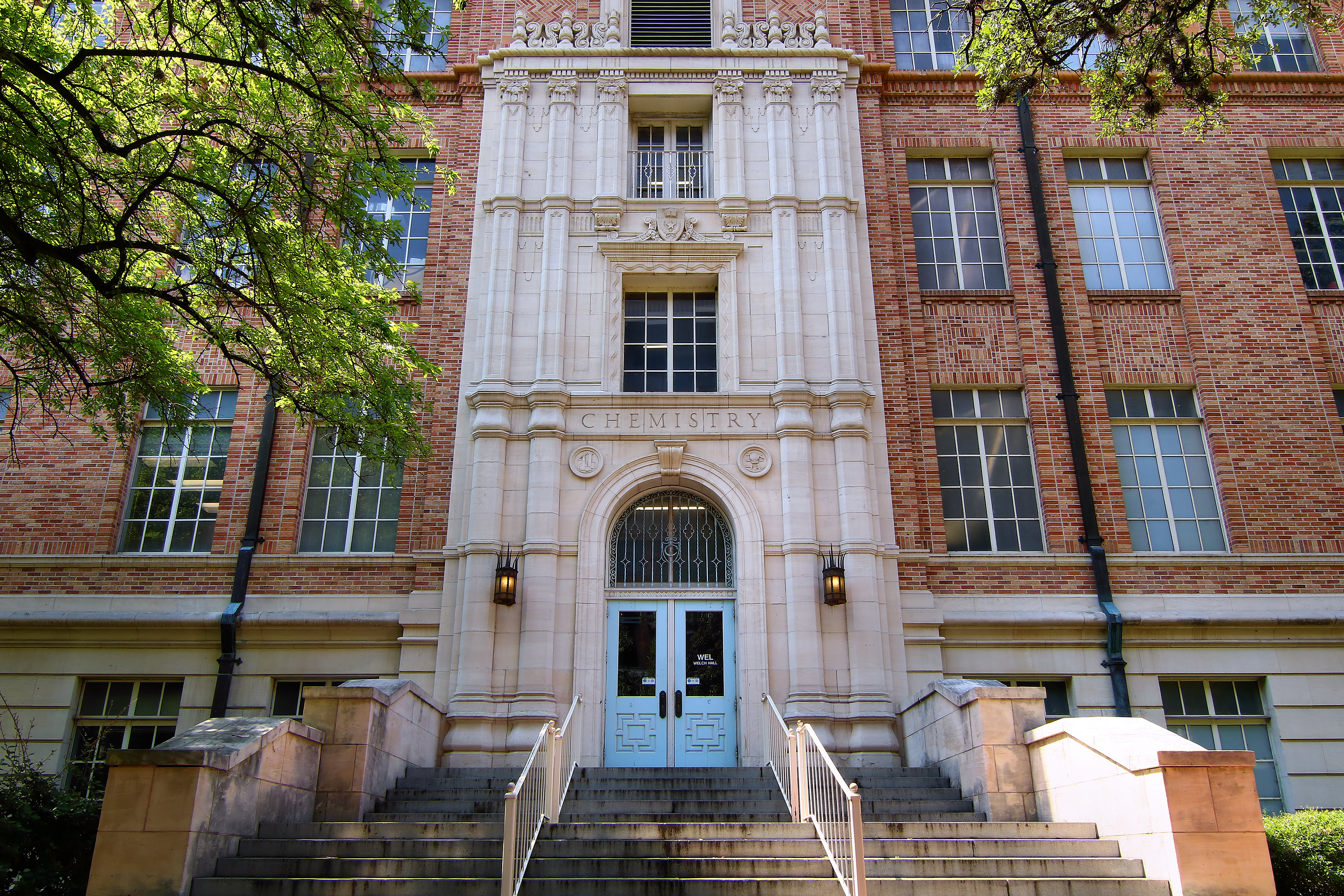
- The 24th Street entrance to Welch Hall
- Interactive map of the Robert A. Welch Hall area
- Former names: Chemistry Building
- Alternative names: WEL

General information
- Location: 105 East 24th Street, Austin, Texas, United States
- Coordinates: 30.2868°N 97.7377°W
- Named for: Robert Alonzo Welch
- Year built: 1929
- Owner: University of Texas at Austin

Technical details
- Floor count: 7
- Floor area: 430,256 sq ft (39,972.1 m^{2})

The Robert A. Welch Hall (abbreviated WEL) is a building located on the University of Texas at Austin campus in Austin, Texas, United States.

== History ==
Before Welch Hall was constructed, the space was designated for Brackenridge Dormitory (built in 1933 and not to be confused with the second dormitory of the same name).

The original building was designed by Herbert M. Greene - Laroche & Dahl Architects from Dallas, Texas in 1929. September 20, 1929 is the date noted on the original plans. Two more wings were added to this building in 1959 and 1974. The 1959 wing was designed by Preston M. Geren (architect and engineer) of Fort Worth, Texas. Page Southerland Page of Austin, Texas were the consulting architects and engineers. Wyatt C. Hedrick Architects and Engineers Inc. of Houston Texas designed the 1974 wing. In this year, the Chemistry Building was christened Welch Hall after Robert A. Welch, whose foundation supported basic chemical research in Texas.

In October 1996, the building caught fire from a research project. In response, the university committed $30.2 million to renovate the hall and updated safety equipment, along with retrofit of equipment to meet new safety standards.
