= Electric Building (Fort Worth, Texas) =

- U.S. National Register of Historic Places
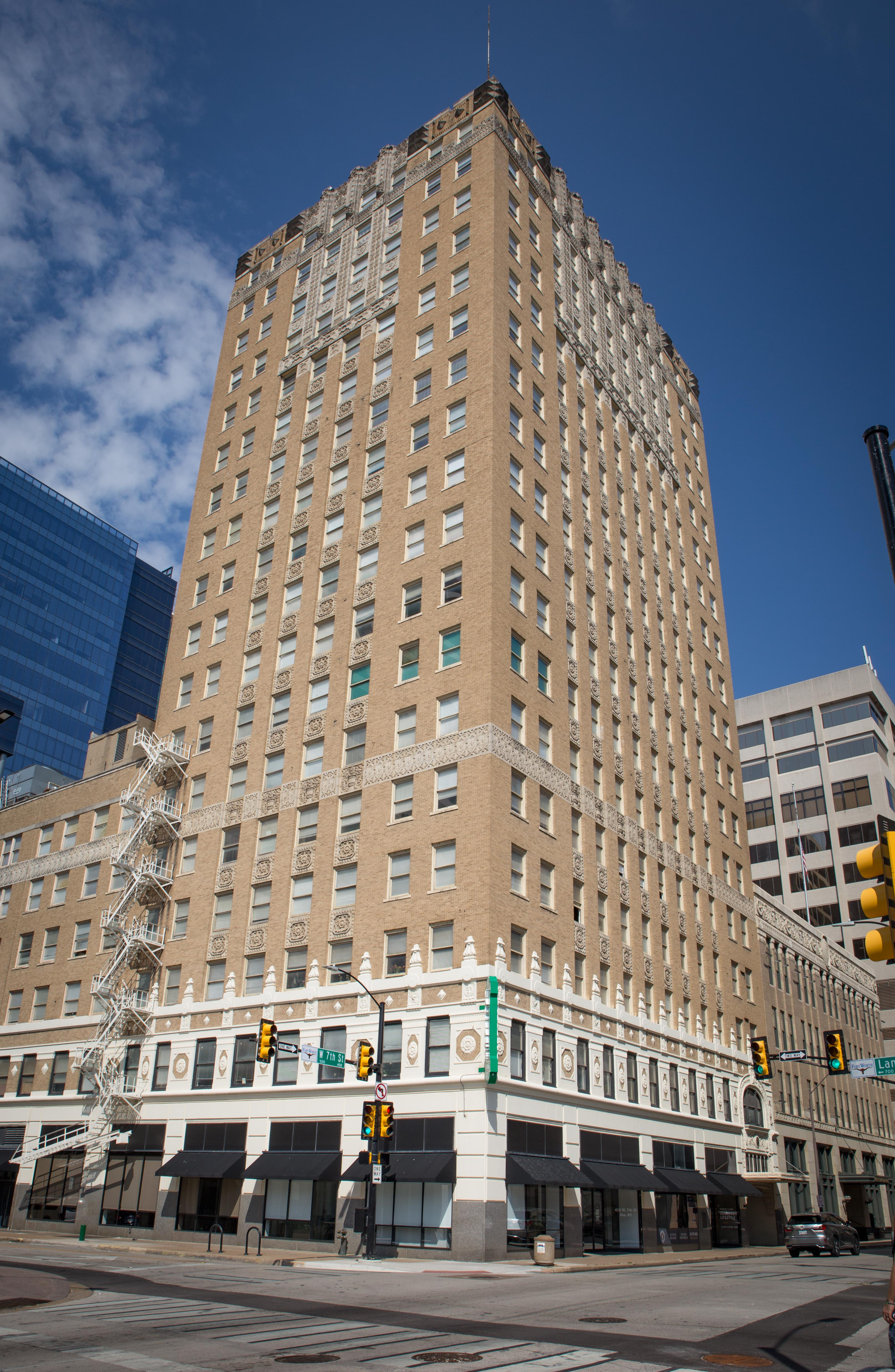
- Electric Building in 2022

- Location within Texas Location within the United States
- Location: 410 W. 7th St., Fort Worth, Texas
- Coordinates: 32°45′5″N 97°19′58″W
- Area: less than one acre
- Built: 1927
- Architect: Wyatt C. Hedrick, et al.
- Architectural style: Art Deco, Three-part vertical block
- NRHP reference No.: 95000048
- Added to NRHP: February 10, 1995

The Electric Building is an 18-story Art Deco and Spanish Renaissance styled building located in downtown Fort Worth, Texas. The building currently houses apartments with the ground floor used for retail stores.

== History ==
Construction on the building began in December 1927. Architect Wyatt C. Hedrick was chosen to design the building. The building also housed the Texas Electric Service Company and the Hollywood Theater. In 1929 a six-story annex was constructed on an adjoining lot.

Interfirst Bank purchased the building in 1974. After closing the Hollywood Theater in 1976, it was remodeled as a banking facility.

The building was purchased by Robert Bass in 1984. In 1994 Bass converted the building into an apartment complex.

In 2009 it was purchased by Atlas Properties, and in 2016 Tradewind Properties of Houston purchased the building from Atlas.

It was added to the National Register in 1995.

== See also ==
- National Register of Historic Places listings in Tarrant County, Texas
