= 777 Main Street =

Residential high-rise building in Fort Worth Texas

Coordinates: 32.7532°N 97.3297°W

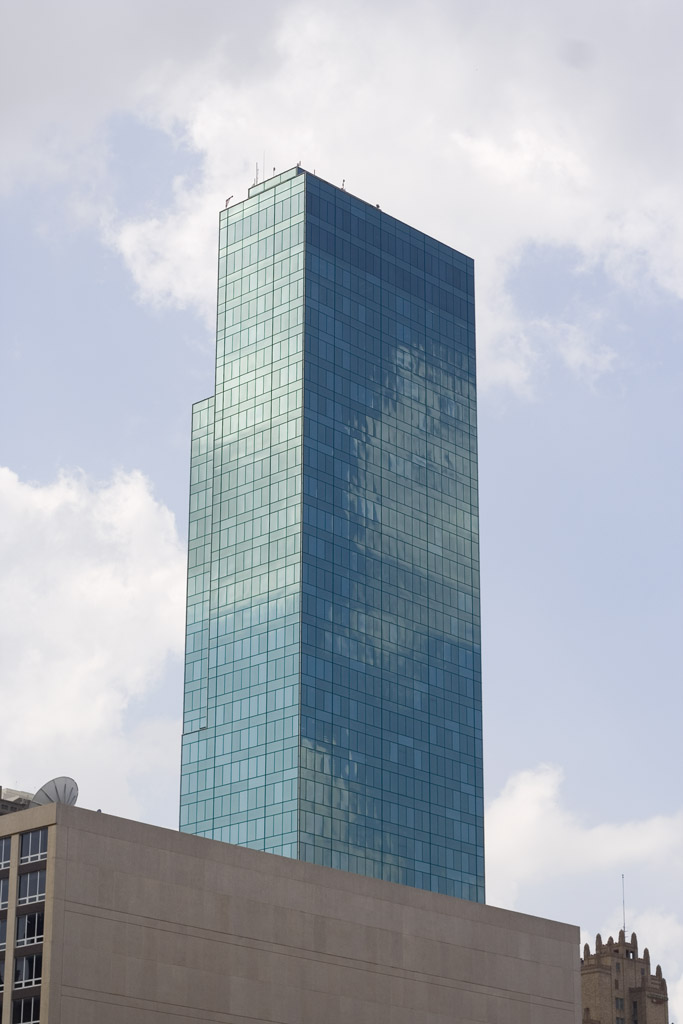
- Interactive map of the 777 Main Street area
- Alternative names: Continental Plaza (1982–1998), UPR Plaza/Union Pacific Resources Building (1998–2000), Carter+Burgess Plaza (2000–2012)

General information
- Status: Completed
- Location: Fort Worth, Texas, United States
- Construction started: 1980
- Completed: 1982

Height
- Height: 525 ft (160 m)

Technical details
- Floor count: 40
- Floor area: 1,025,252 sq ft (95,249.0 m^{2})
- Lifts/elevators: 24

Design and construction
- Architect: JPJ Architects
- Structural engineer: Brockette Davis Drake
- Main contractor: HCB Contractors

777 Main Street is a skyscraper located in Fort Worth, Texas. At 525 feet (160 meters), it is the third tallest building in Fort Worth. It has 40 stories, and was completed in 1983. Its address is 777 Main Street, and it takes up the block bounded by Commerce Street, East 7th Street, Main Street, and Northeast 6th Street. The building stands at the site where the demolished Aviation Building existed between 1930 and 1978. Typical floorplates for this building are 23,000 square feet (2,100 m^{2}).

The building was significantly damaged by an F3 tornado on March 28, 2000, about 1,300 of the 5,000 buildings windows were blown out and repairs were done in 2001.

The building has been known under a series of names in the past as its main tenants have changed. Before 1998 it was known as the Continental Plaza; from 1998 to 2000 as the UPR Plaza; and from 2000 to 2012 as the Carter Burgess Plaza.
