= Farmers and Mechanics National Bank (Fort Worth) =

- Farmers and Mechanics Bank Building
- U.S. National Register of Historic Places
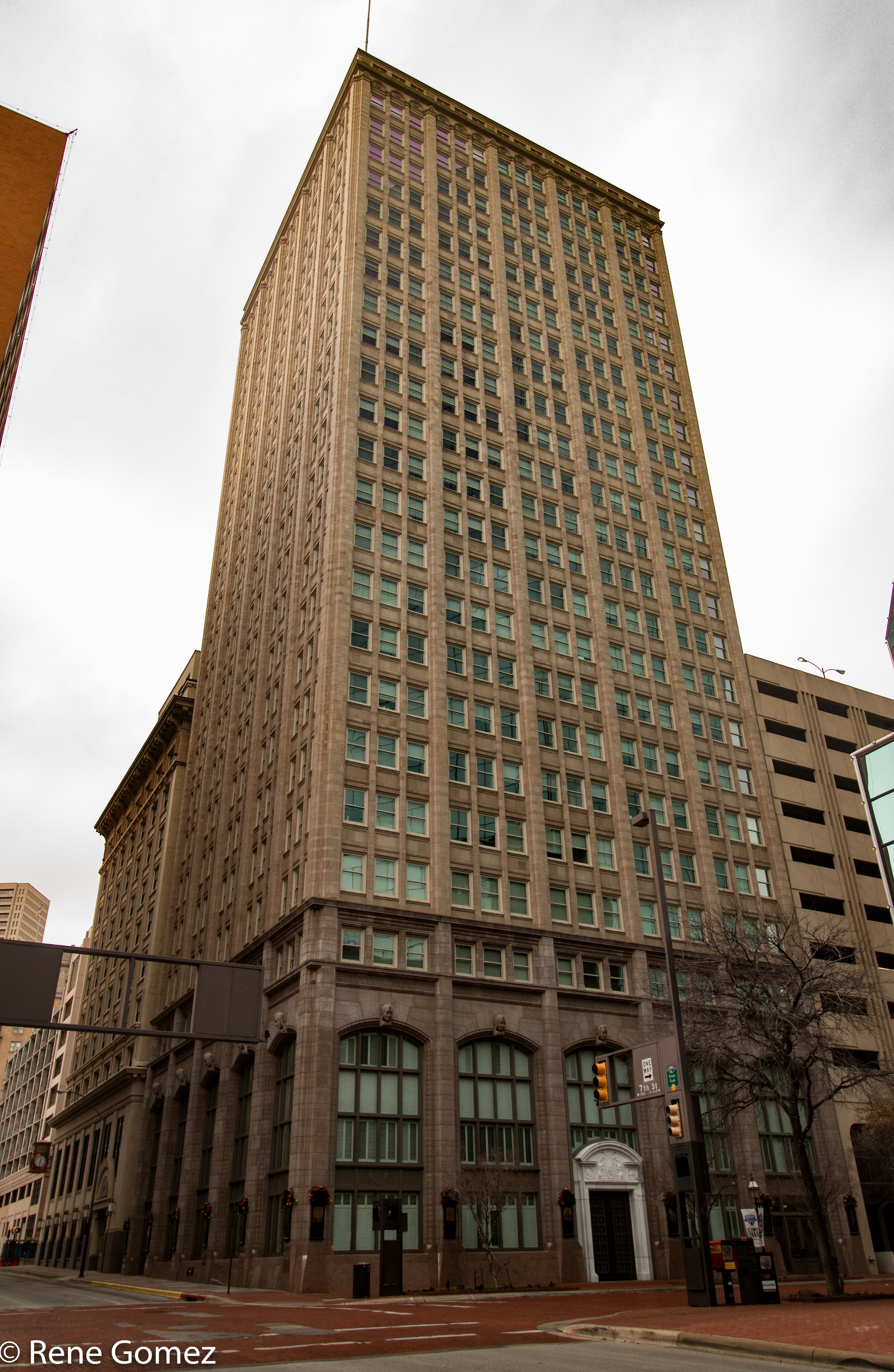
- Farmers and Mechanics Building in 2016

- Location within Texas Location within the United States
- Location: 714 Main St., Fort Worth, Texas
- Coordinates: 32°45′10″N 97°19′49″W
- Area: less than one acre
- Built: 1921
- Architect: Sanguinet & Staats, et al.
- Architectural style: Early Commercial
- NRHP reference No.: 12001004
- Added to NRHP: December 4, 2012

The Farmers and Mechanics National Bank is located at 714 Main Street in Fort Worth, Texas, at the corner of Main and Seventh streets. The building now the home of the Kimpton Harper Hotel.

Designed in the Chicago Style the building was constructed in 1921. It was designed by the prominent architectural firm Sanguinet and Staats. The building was constructed during a time when Fort Worth was experiencing tremendous growth as a result of the oil and cattle industry. It remained the tallest building in Fort Worth until 1957. The building was vacant from 1997 until 2007 when XTO purchased the building and started renovations.

It has also been known as Fort Worth National Bank; Continental Life; Transport Life; A. Davis Men's, and 714 Main.

It is a three-part vertical block building.

== See also ==
- National Register of Historic Places listings in Tarrant County, Texas
