= Burnett Plaza =

Coordinates: 32.7505°N 97.3345°W

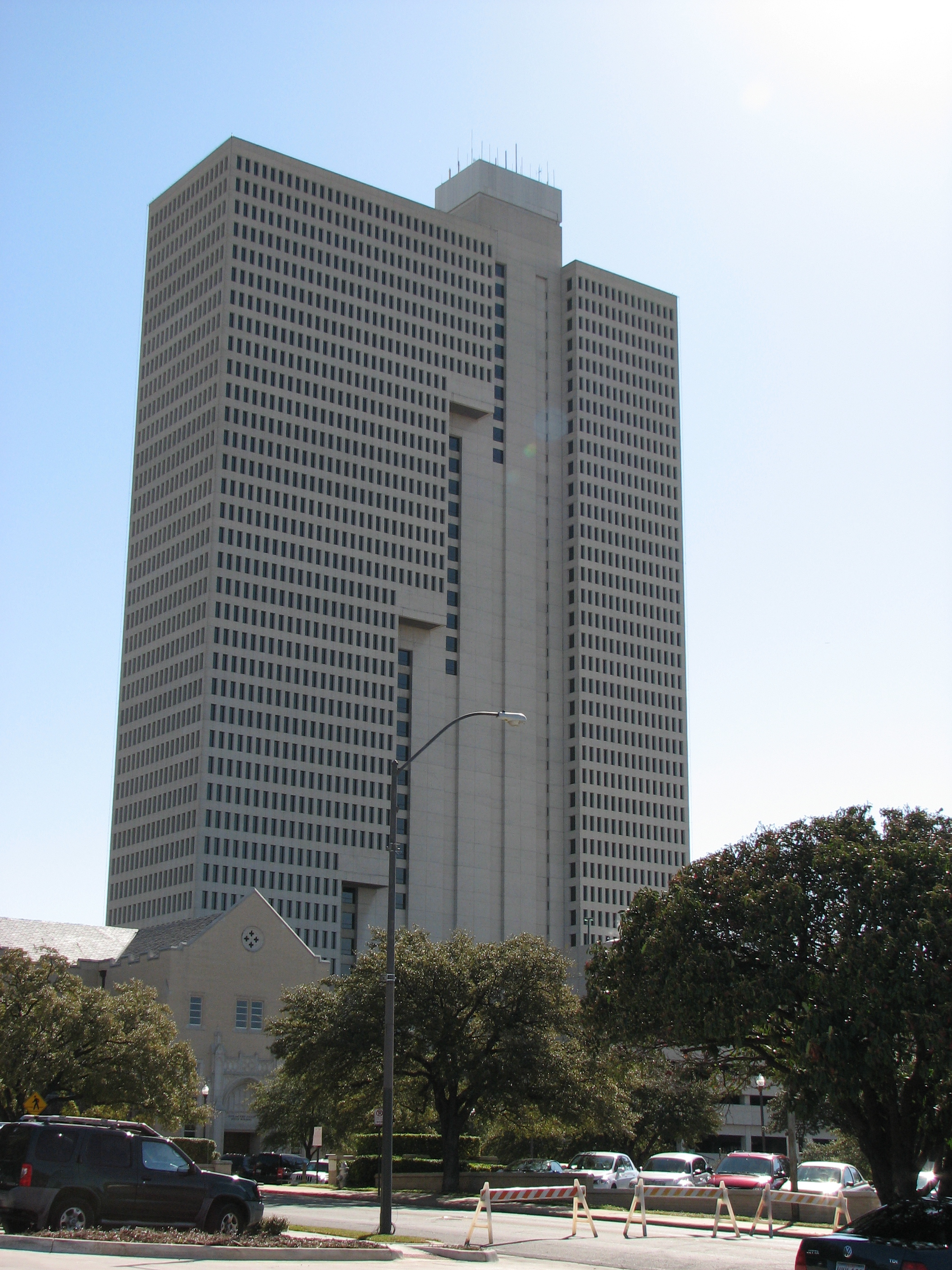
- Burnett Plaza building, west side
- Interactive map of the Burnett Plaza area

General information
- Status: Completed
- Type: Office
- Architectural style: Brutalism
- Location: 801 Cherry Street, Fort Worth, Texas
- Construction started: 1981
- Completed: 1983

Height
- Height: 567 ft (173 m)

Design and construction
- Structural engineer: Carlton Maxwell
- Main contractor: Randy Cody

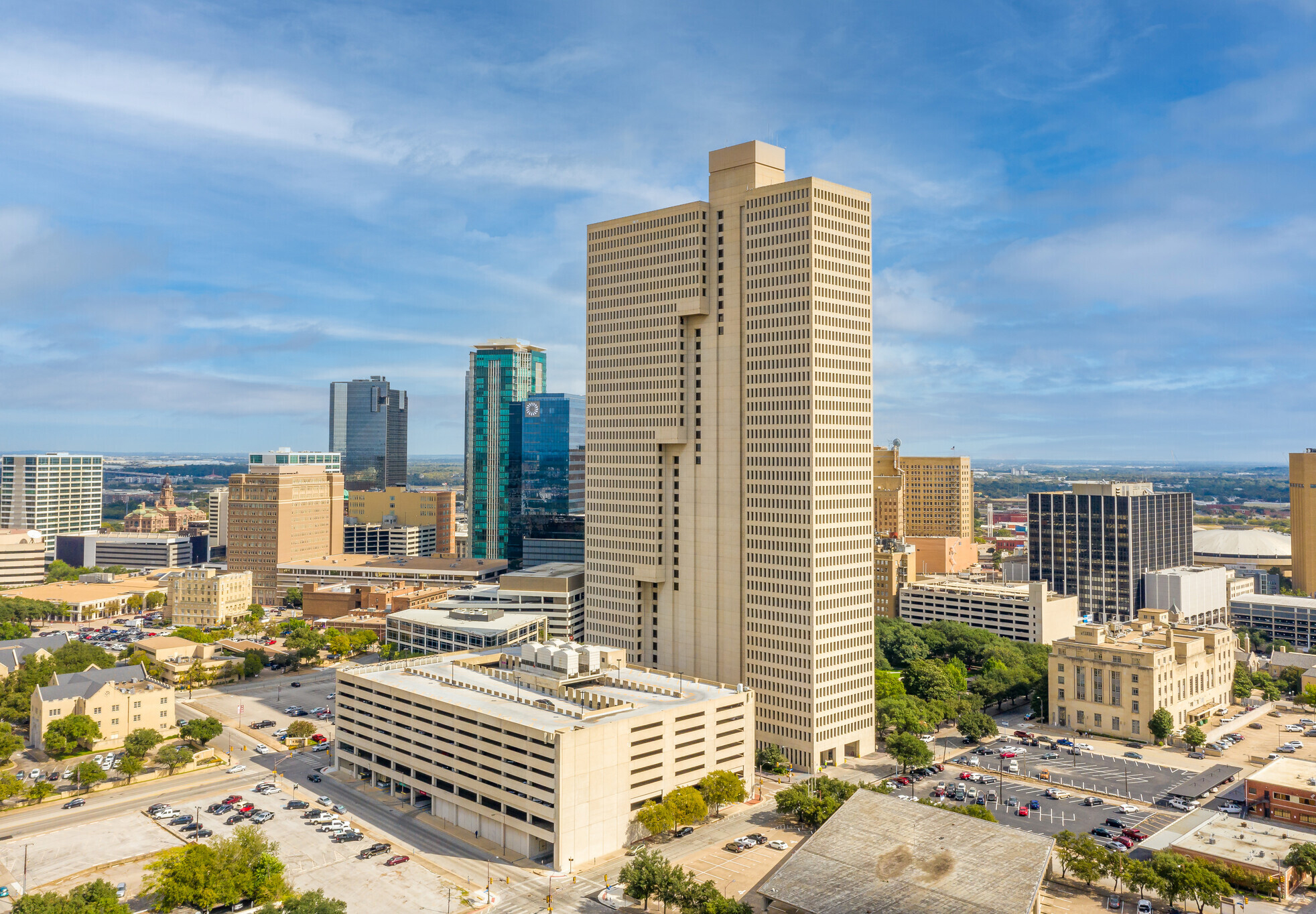

Burnett Plaza is a building located in Fort Worth, Texas. At 567 feet (173 meters), it is the tallest building in Fort Worth.

== Overview ==
Built in 1983, the building is a block-sized complex that is adjacent to a public urban park.

The building is also Fort Worth's largest office tower with over one million square feet of commercial office and retail space.

The building was purchased for $137,500,000 in 2021. It was sold in 2023 at a foreclosure auction for $12.3 million.

== See also ==
- List of tallest buildings in Fort Worth

Records
| Preceded by Wells Fargo Tower | Tallest building in Fort Worth; 567 feet (173 m); 1983-current | Incumbent |
