= List of neighborhoods in Fort Worth, Texas =

Fort Worth neighborhood profile data

== East ==
- Eastchase
- Eastern Hills
- Eastwood
- Echo Heights
- Ederville
- Glencrest
- Haltom City, TX is bordered by Watauga Blvd on the North, Beach Street on the West, US Hwy 377 on the East and Belknap on the South. The zip code is 76117.
- Historic Carver Heights
- Handley
- Meadowbrook
- Parker Essex Boaz (PEB)
- Polytechnic Heights

Texas Wesleyan University is located in Polytechnic Heights.

- River Trails
- Sagamore Hill
- Stop Six
- White Lake Hills
- Woodhaven

== North ==
- Diamond Hill
- Northside
- River Oaks

River Oaks is a separate, incorporated city.

- Rock Island
- Sansom Park

Sansom Park is a separate, incorporated city.

- Stockyards

The Fort Worth Stockyards are a National Historic District north of Downtown. The Stockyards was once among the largest livestock markets in the United States and played a vital role in the city's early growth. Today the neighborhood is characterized by its many bars, restaurants, and notable country music values such as Billy Bob's. Fort Worth celebrity chef Tim Love of Iron Chef America and Top Chef Masters operates multiple restaurants in the neighborhood.

== Northeast ==
- Riverside

The neighborhood of Riverside lies east of I-35W and north of 121 Airport Freeway, and is divided into four sections :
- Bonnie Brae
- Oakhurst
- Springdale
- United Riverside
- Northbrook

== Far North ==
- Crawford Farms
- Fossil Creek
- Harriet Creek Ranch
- Heritage
- Lake Country
- Lost Creek Ranch
- Marine Creek
- Park Glen
- Summerfields
- Woodland Springs

- Timberland Estates
- Harvest Ridge
- Rolling Meadows

== West ==
- Alamo Heights

Alamo Heights is a neighborhood that is generally bound by Interstate 30 to the north, Vickery Boulevard to the south and west, Hulen to the west, and South University Drive to the east. Arlington Heights High School is located within the neighborhood.

- Arlington Heights

Arlington Heights is a neighborhood that is generally bound by Camp Bowie Boulevard to the north and west, Interstate 30 to the south, and Montgomery to the east. Most of the homes in Arlington Heights were built in the 1920s and are of either a Bungalow or Tudor architectural style. It is a well maintained neighborhood with many families, young professionals, and retirees. Property values here have risen in recent years due to its proximity to the Cultural District, Downtown, Camp Bowie Boulevard, and its location on Fort Worth's Westside, which makes it adjacent to many of the city's most elite neighborhoods.

- Bomber Heights
- Camp Bowie West
- Como

The Como neighborhood is located on the west side of Fort Worth. It was named after Como, Italy. It is a historically African-American neighborhood. One of many famous Como residents was the neighborhood activist Viola Pitts, who served as Chair of the Como NAC and a Precinct Chair. The Como Lake was built in 1889. Originally the neighborhood was conceived as a resort. In the early 1900s Lillian Russell visited the resort and was impressed by it.

- Lake Worth
- Markum Ranch
- Montserrat
- North Benbrook
- Ridglea
- Ridglea Hills
- Ridglea West
- Ridgmar
- Rivercrest

Rivercrest is the second most prestigious neighborhood in Fort Worth, behind Westover Hills. It lies to the north of Camp Bowie Boulevard. Rivercrest contains a diverse housing stock, which includes historic mansions, smaller tudor and bungalow style homes, and intimate apartment buildings, as well as numerous new large homes that have replaced smaller, older homes. Much of the neighborhood surrounds Rivercrest Country Club.

- Silver Saddle
- Western Hills East
- Western Hills North
- Western Hills Northeast
- Western Hills Northwest
- Western Hills South
- Westland
- Westover Hills

Westover Hills is a tiny municipality that is completely surrounded by the city of Fort Worth. It lies just north of Camp Bowie Boulevard and is adjacent to Shady Oaks Country Club, the home course of golf legend Ben Hogan. It is one of the wealthiest areas of the city and the home of many of Fort Worth's most prominent citizens. The housing stock consists almost exclusively of large mansions constructed from the early twentieth century up to the present day. Homes in Westover Hills set are large lots and are surrounded by trees.

- Westworth Village

Westworth Village is a tiny municipality almost entirely surrounded by Fort Worth.

== Central ==
- Downtown Fort Worth

- Upper West Side
The Upper West Side is a district on the western end of Downtown. It is bound roughly by Henderson Street to the east, the Trinity River to the west, Interstate 30 to the south, and White Settlement Road to the north. The neighborhood contains several small and mid-sized office buildings and urban residences, but very little retail.

- Sundance Square
Sundance Square is a 35-block mixed-use area that consists of office buildings, hotels, urban residences, bars, restaurants, retailers, and cultural venues. The district has experienced many new residential and commercial developments in recent years, but has maintained its rich architectural heritage through historic preservation. Reata at Sundance Square, the restaurant that replaced the Caravan of Dreams nightclub, operates in this downtown district.

- Trinity Bluff

- Cultural District

The Fort Worth Cultural District lies across the river to the west of Downtown Fort Worth and is renowned for its high concentration of notable museums such as the Amon Carter Museum, Fort Worth Museum of Science and History, Kimbell Art Museum, Modern Art Museum of Fort Worth, and National Cowgirl Museum and Hall of Fame. The area was expanded northward to White Settlement Road in 1986 when Greenwood Memorial Park dedicated striking replicas of the Triumphal Quadriga or Horses of St Mark at its entrance. The area has experienced significant urban revitalization in recent years, especially along West 7th Street, which has been vital in connecting the Cultural District with Downtown. Among the largest recent developments have been Museum Place, West 7th, Montgomery Plaza, and So7. These combined developments, as well as several other smaller infill projects, have brought well over 1,000 new housing units in a mixed-use setting to create a true urban environment.

- Six Points

Six Points lies west of Downtown Fort Worth, within an area of the city known as the Cultural District. It is the apex of where University Drive, Camp Bowie Boulevard, Arch Adams (recently renamed Van Cliburn Way), 7th Street, Lancaster, and Montgomery Street merge to form the Six Points intersection and neighborhood. The neighborhood has experienced somewhat of an urban rebirth in recent years, with new bars and restaurants opening on and around 7th Street, including the restoration of what was once the Montgomery Wards building on 7th Street, and further development into what is now known as Montgomery Plaza. Six Points is expected to continue its renaissance, due to its proximity to Downtown and housing prices that are more affordable compared with other historic neighborhoods in the Fort Worth central core.

- Near Southside

Near Southside lies directly south of Downtown and is the second largest employment center in Tarrant County, with over 30,000 employees working in numerous medical institutions and other businesses. The district is often referred to by locals as the "medical district" or "hospital district". Today the Near Southside is considered to be one of the city's most up-and-coming neighborhoods. Historic architecture, eclectic restaurants such as Spiral Diner, King Tut, and Nonna Tata, and the neighborhood's walkability have attracted residents seeking an urban environment. In 2008, the city of Fort Worth declared the Near Southside as an Urban Design District, which requires new development to abide by specific zoning and aesthetic standards that will help to improve the walkability and mixed-use aspects of the neighborhood as it continues to revitalize. Numerous new living options such as historic lofts, townhomes, live+work units, and the rehabilitation of historic single-family homes continue to attract residents to the area.

- Historic Southside

Historic Southside is located southeast of downtown Fort Worth. The neighborhood is known for its African American history, as it is the home of the Lenora Rolla Heritage Center Museum and the forthcoming National Juneteenth Museum.
- Terrell Heights
The community of Terrell Heights is the first historically Black middle-class neighborhood in Fort Worth. The community received a historic marker in 2019 that celebrated the impact of Terrell Heights-native, and the first Black millionaire in Texas, William "Gooseneck Bill" McDonald. The neighborhood is also home to the non-profit organization, The Renaissance House of Terrell Heights, which focuses on preserving the Black history of the 76104 zip code.

- Berkeley Place
- Fairmount
- Mistletoe Heights
- Ryan Place

== South ==
- Bluebonnet
- Camelot
- Candleridge
- Colonial
- Bellaire
- Greenbriar
- Hallmark
- Hulen Heights
- Highland Hills
- Mira Vista

Mira Vista is a gated community in far Southwest Fort Worth with over 700 high end houses, a championship golf course and country club.

- Morningside
- Overton Park

Overton Park is a neighborhood represented by the Overton Park Neighborhood Association (OPNA) www.overtonpark-na.org in Fort Worth, Texas located southwest of city's downtown. The neighborhood is located slightly south of the Clear Fork Branch of the Trinity River. The Overton Park NA currently consists of approximately 1,000 homes with easy access to major arterial roadways and expressways. Texas Ranch Style Single Family Homes, tall mature trees, the City's Overton Park and Trinity Trail are prominent features of this well established Fort Worth neighborhood.

History The Overton Park neighborhood consists of land both in the high and low areas lying areas that feed the Clear Fork Branch of the Trinity River and is approximately five miles southwest from the Fort Worth Central Business District. The Overton Park area lies near two surveys. The western part of the addition being part of the 1854 Felix G. Beasley Survey, and the eastern part, along the branch of the river, the 1876 James Howard Survey. The original approach to the Overton Park area consisted of unfinished roadways now South Hulen Street and Bellaire Drive South. The high land portion of Overton Park near Autumn Drive was originally a dairy farm and Ranch View Road still defines the neighborhood's current and adjacent connection that runs along the original Cass Edward's homestead. Land use restrictions filed on the Overton Park and Overton West additions stipulate that all houses must be brick or stone, and have at least a two-car garage attached to the house. Though this was originally ranch property before its 1960s development, deed restrictions also stated that no cows, horses or other livestock would be allowed on the property after its development.

Neighborhood Description The heritage of the ranchland shows in the typical architecture of homes in Overton Park, the predominant being ranch style. Most of the homes are single story with a few second stories. The streets wind around generally following the contours of the river and the trees tower over all. This is good bottom land and very fertile. The Overton Park neighborhood children can currently attend Tanglewood Elementary which has long been the highest ranking elementary school in Fort Worth ISD. A new Elementary school is scheduled to open in 2020 and will be attended by children in Overton Park, Overton Woods, Riverhills and Foster Park.

Schools The neighborhood is zoned to schools in the Fort Worth Independent School District. Tanglewood Elementary School W.P. McLean Middle School R. L. Paschal High School

- Overton South
- Overton West
- Overton Woods
- Park Hill
- Rolling Hills
- South Hills
- Stonegate
- Summer Creek
- Tanglewood
- TCU area
- University Place
- University West
- Wedgwood
- Wedgewood Central
- Wedgewood East
- Wedgewood Middle
- Wedgewood South
- Wedgewood Square
- Wedgewood West
- Westcliff
- Worth Heights
