= 2000 Fort Worth tornado outbreak =

Natural disaster in downtown Fort Worth, Texas, United States on March 28, 2000

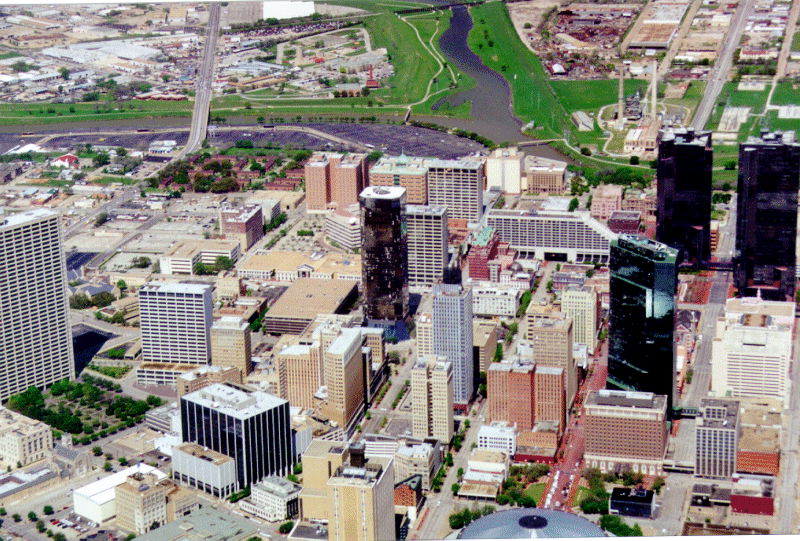
- Aerial view of damaged skyscrapers in downtown Fort Worth

Meteorological history
- Duration: March 28, 2000

Tornado outbreak
- Tornadoes: 10
- Max. rating: F3 tornado

Overall effects
- Fatalities: 2 (+1 non-tornadic)
- Injuries: 80
- Damage: $450 million (2000 USD; $608 million 2016 USD)
- Areas affected: Dallas–Fort Worth metroplex
- Part of the Tornadoes of 2000

During the evening hours of March 28, 2000, an intense F3 tornado (Note: The National Weather Service officially documents the Fort Worth tornado as an F3 with winds between 158–206 mph (254–332 km/h) However, a separate damage survey and radar analysis conducted by Timothy P. Marshall and Micahel Foster of the National Weather Service Weather Forecast Office in Norman, Oklahoma concluded tornadic winds peaking at 55-65 ms^{−1} (125–145 mph; 201–233 km/h); such winds would have corresponded to estimated F2 intensity winds under the former Fujita scale. However, since the Fujita scale is damage-based and not wind-based, the estimated winds did not factor into the tornado's classification.) struck Downtown Fort Worth, Texas, causing significant damage to numerous buildings and skyscrapers as well as two deaths. The tornado was part of a larger severe weather outbreak that caused widespread storms across Texas and Oklahoma in late-March, spurred primarily by the moist and unstable atmospheric environment over the South Central United States as a result of an eastward-moving upper-level low and shortwave trough. The tornado outbreak was well forecast by both computer forecast models and the National Weather Service, though the eventual focal point for the severe weather—North Texas—only came into focus on March 28 as the conditions favorable for tornadic development quickly took hold.

The tornado initially began as a relatively weak tornado in River Oaks, gradually strengthening as it tracked southeastward and then eastward towards Fort Worth's central business district. The tornado damaged 266 homes across its 4 mi (6.4 km) long and 250 yd (230 m) wide path, out of which 28 were destroyed. Damage surveys indicated that much of the tornado's destruction was due to structural deficiencies in many of the older subdivisions impacted by the tornado. Various high-rise and low-rise buildings in downtown Fort Worth sustained various degrees of structural damage including numerous broken windows. Nine other tornadoes also occurred across North Texas on March 28; although most were relatively inconsequential, another strong F3 tornado struck portions of Arlington, including Arlington Municipal Airport. Aside from the two deaths caused by the tornado, a third person was killed in north Fort Worth by a fall of baseball-sized hail.

== Meteorological synopsis ==
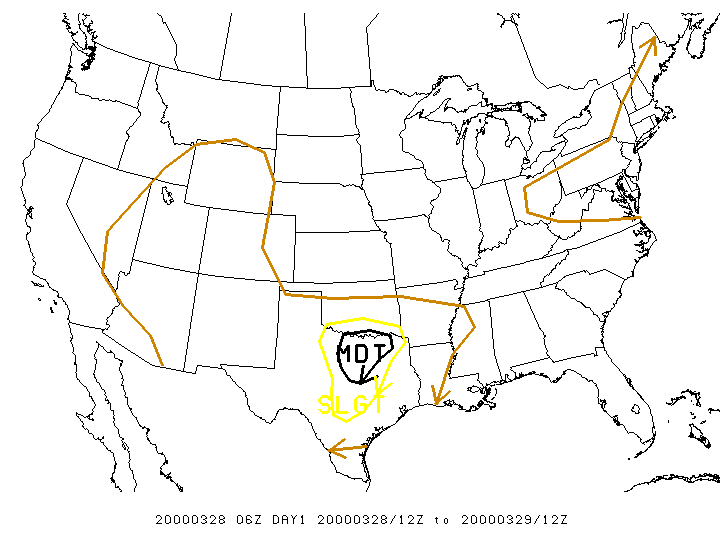
Convective outlook from the Storm Prediction Center highlighting a moderate risk of severe weather over North Texas on March 28

Early on March 28, an upper-level low tracked eastward into the Southern United States along with its associated shortwave trough, sending the subtropical jet through Texas and bringing along with it strong west-northwesterly winds in the upper-levels of the troposphere. Concurrently, a cold front extended zonally tracked south across the Great Plains before eventually stalling near the Red River valley, providing an additional focus area for storm development. Favorable conditions for severe weather were expected ahead of the upper-level low over areas of North Texas; accordingly, the Storm Prediction Center (SPC) issued a moderate risk for severe weather for the region, citing an unstable atmosphere caused by steep lapse rates of 7.5-8.0 °C/km and high convective available potential energy values. The environment was expected to be conducive for the development of supercells as the warped subtropical jet produced strong wind shear over Texas.

Later that day, a low-level low-pressure area developed west of Wichita Falls at the intersection of a dry line extended southward across Central Texas and the stationary front extended eastward across the Red River valley. With the low-pressure system now in place, the air mass over the Red River valley became increasingly unstable, featuring surface temperatures near 90 °F (32 °C) and high dew points caused by the northerly surge of moisture induced by the subtropical jet. The combination of high temperatures and a moist atmosphere resulted in a favorable environment for thunderstorm development. However, despite the heat, temperatures alone were insufficient in breaking the capping inversion–an area of warmer air aloft that prevents the relativity cooler air near the surface from rising. Instead, the approaching shortwave trough provided the impetus necessary to force convection to occur, allowing for the formation of showers and thunderstorms.

Initially, computer models indicated that the day's storms would primarily feature strong winds and hail with a minimal risk for tornadoes, with severe weather occurring mainly north of the stalled front in Oklahoma. However, conditions improved further than expected, leading the National Weather Service Weather Forecast Office in Fort Worth, Texas to intensify its verbiage in its public forecasting products as the day progressed and highlighting areas around the Dallas–Fort Worth metroplex as potential risk areas for tornadoes. Thunderstorms began to develop earnestly along the dry line as the afternoon progressed, beginning with initial storm development northeast of Abilene. The strong southwesterly winds aloft from the curved subtropical jet over the region helped to ventilate the storms, allowing for their persistence and intensity. The SPC issued its first of two tornado watches for the event at 2:53 p.m. CST (20:53 UTC) for portions of southern Oklahoma and North-Central Texas. The most favorable environment for tornadoes was initially over the Red River but shifted southward to include the Dallas–Fort Worth area in the evening hours. As storms continued to develop along a line paralleling Interstate 35, some storms congealed into a mesoscale convective system near the Metroplex; this cluster of storms produced both F3 tornadoes in Fort Worth and Arlington. The complex of storms eventually evolved into a transient bow echo that continued to track eastward into Louisiana. Elsewhere, supercells continued to propagate eastward across North and South-Central Texas along the dry line, slowly weakening after sunset.

== Confirmed tornadoes ==
Confirmed tornadoes by Fujita rating
FU	F0	F1	F2	F3	F4	F5	Total
0	7	1	0	2	0	0	10

=== March 28 event ===
List of confirmed tornadoes – Tuesday, March 28, 2000
F#	Location	County / parish	State	Start coord.	Time (CST)	Path length	Max width	Summary
F0	St. Jo	Montague	TX	33.70°N 97.53°W	17:24	0.1 mi (0.16 km)	10 yd (9.1 m)	A mobile home was damaged in St. Jo. Hail from the same supercell damaged cars on US 82. The same storm would later produce several funnel clouds and an additional tornado over Cooke County.
F3	Fort Worth	Tarrant	TX	32.75°N 97.35°W	18:18–18:28	4 mi (6.4 km)	250 yd (230 m)	2 deaths – See above section on this tornado – 80 people were injured.
F0	Itasca	Hill	TX	33.70°N 97.53°W	18:20	0.1 mi (0.16 km)	10 yd (9.1 m)	This brief tornado did no damage. The same thunderstorm would later spawn two additional tornadoes in Navarro County.
F0	Lindsay	Cooke	TX	33.65°N 97.23°W	18:20	0.1 mi (0.16 km)	10 yd (9.1 m)	This brief tornado did no damage. The same storm also produced the earlier F0 tornado in Montague County, in addition to several funnel clouds.
F3	Arlington	Tarrant, Dallas	TX	32.73°N 97.12°W	19:05–19:15	8 mi (13 km)	300 yd (270 m)	After the Fort Worth tornado dissipated, another thunderstorm developed over Johnson County, tracking northeastward into Tarrant County and eventually merging with the supercell that had produced the earlier F3 tornado. The new development prompted the re-issuance of the tornado warning for Tarrant County at 6:40 p.m. CST (00:40 UTC). The Arlington tornado touched down then touched down 25 minutes later, causing initial damage to a restaurant; the tornado's touchdown coincided with the appearance of a tornado vortex signature on radar imagery. Well-built homes within a residential area sustained widespread damage, with some houses experiencing up to F3-rated damage; such damage occurred after garage doors failed, allowing tornadic winds to unroof homes and push out exterior walls. As a consequence, homes that faced the tornadic winds sustained more damage than homes whose attached garages were sheltered from the strong winds. The tornado then did additional damage to one- and two-story homes in another subdivision, producing F3 damage. Many homes suffered the collapse of brick masonry walls due to poor construction as they were not properly anchored to the homes' frames. The tornado then swept across northern portions of the Arlington Municipal Airport, dealing F2 damage before briefly paralleling I-20. The tornado then crossed the interstate, overturning at least one 18-wheeler. The tornado continued to track northeast, causing F2 damage to a subdivision northeast of Grand Prairie Municipal Airport in Dallas County before dissipating.
F0	Leon Valley	Bexar	TX	29.48°N 98.65°W	19:11–19:12	0.1 mi (0.16 km)	20 yd (18 m)	This small and short-lived tornado did minimal damage. However, the tornado was preceded by 40–50 mph (64–80 km/h) winds and large hail that damaged cars in Leon Valley.
F0	Roane	Navarro	TX	32.18°N 96.38°W	19:55	0.1 mi (0.16 km)	10 yd (9.1 m)	A barn was destroyed, and another was unroofed by the tornado, causing $10,000 in damage. The same storm that produced this tornado also produced an F1 tornado near Bazette and produced the earlier tornado in Hill County, in addition to widespread non-tornadic damage.
F0	WSW of Wilmer	Dallas	TX	32.55°N 96.77°W	19:55	0.1 mi (0.16 km)	10 yd (9.1 m)	Storm spotters observed a brief touchdown in rural areas of Red Oak and Wilmer from the same supercell that spawned the earlier F3 tornado in Arlington.
F1	Bazette	Navarro	TX	32.18°N 96.27°W	20:15	3 mi (4.8 km)	250 yd (230 m)	Three mobile homes and five barns were destroyed in Bazette. The roofs of two other homes were damaged. Damage from this tornado amounted to $200,000.
F0	Trinidad	Henderson	TX	32.15°N 96.10°W	20:30	0.5 mi (0.80 km)	20 yd (18 m)	A few residences in Trinidad sustained minor damage and trees were downed. The same parent thunderstorm spawned the tornadoes in Navarro and Hill counties and also produced destructive hail over nearby Malakoff and Athens.

== Fort Worth, Texas ==
2000 Fort Worth tornado outbreak
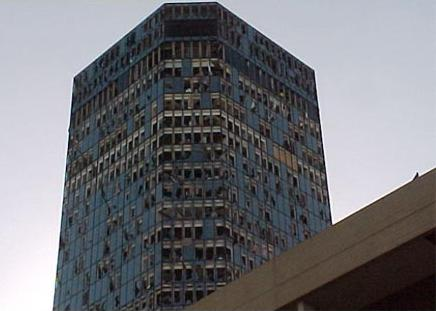
- Broken windows on the facade of the Fort Worth Bank One building.

Meteorological history
- Formed: March 28, 2000, 6:18 p.m. CST (UTC–05:00)
- Dissipated: March 28, 2000, 6:28 p.m. CST (UTC–05:00)
- Duration: 10 minutes

F3 tornado
- on the Fujita scale
- Max width: 250 yards (0.14 mi; 0.23 km)
- Path length: 4 miles (6.4 km)
- Highest winds: 158–206 mph (254–332 km/h)

Overall effects
- Fatalities: 2
- Injuries: 80
- Damage: $450 million (2000 USD; $608 million 2016 USD)
- Areas affected: Tarrant County, Texas (specifically Fort Worth, Texas)

The thunderstorm that would eventually produce this intense and destructive F3 tornado in Fort Worth developed from a cluster of storms that formed west of the city. At 4:38 p.m. CST (22:38 UTC), a severe thunderstorm warning was issued on the quickly organizing storm for Parker County. About an hour later, another severe thunderstorm warning was issued, this time for Tarrant County, as the storm continued to track eastward. Radar imagery showed that the supercell was rapidly organizing, developing a bounded weak echo region and hook echo—radar signatures that hint at a strong and potentially tornadic thunderstorm—in less than a half-hour. Radar also indicated that a broad mesocyclone had developed by around 6:00 p.m. CST (00:00 UTC), extending vertically through the entirety of the supercell. At around the same time, a wall cloud was spotted in association with the rotating thunderstorm while baseball-sized hail fell ahead of the rotation in northern Fort Worth along I-820. Winds from the downdraft of another small thunderstorm south of Fort Worth allowed the strengthening supercell to organize further. At 6:10 p.m. (00:10 UTC), a tornado warning was issued for Tarrant County, and accordingly emergency sirens were activated in the Fort Worth a minute later.The tornado touched down at 6:18 p.m. CST (00:18 UTC) near Castleberry High School northwest of downtown Fort Worth. Initially, the tornado lacked a condensation funnel, and could only be visually identified as dust swirls near the ground beneath the rotating wall cloud aloft; the tornado maintained this appearance for the first five minutes of its lifespan, after which a condensation funnel eventually developed. The first signs of damage occurred in the River Oaks area along SH 183 where metal roof panels were stripped off of a vacant fast food restaurant. After crossing the highway, the tornado inflicted sporadic F0 damage to an older residential area, breaking tree branches and causing some damage to outbuildings; a few chimneys were toppled off of homes. At the time, the tornado's damage path was only a few hundred feet wide. A roof of a home near Roberts Cut Off Road was partially removed, signifying the first instance of F1 damage. Several large and rotted trees were uprooted by the tornado's strong winds as it moved through the area. The tornado then passed directly over Castleberry High School, causing significant damage to the school's field house. Tornadic debris—including rooftop air conditioning units, gravel, and other detached construction—was thrown by the tornado at the school's western façade, causing minor damage. Throughout River Oak, three homes sustained major damage while 51 others experienced minor damage.

The tornado crossed the Trinity River and dealt F1 or greater damage to over a hundred homes in the adjacent subdivision. Some roofs sustained partial roof loss and many large trees either lost limbs or were toppled. At the intersection of West Sixth Street and University Drive, the tornado abruptly turned east from its initial southeast heading, bringing it over the Linwood subdivision at around 6:22 p.m. CST (00:22 UTC). The homes in the neighborhood were mostly small, wood-framed structures on pier or beam foundations, making them highly vulnerable to the tornadic winds and resulting in widespread structural failure. A survey conducted by the Wind Damage and Engineering Program at Texas Tech University later concluded that many of the buildings that suffered total structural failure did so due to structural deficiencies rather than the strong winds associated with the tornado. The tornado then passed over a Montgomery Ward distribution center, causing roof damage to the complex and overturning numerous parked trucks; one person was killed while trying to reach shelter after a truck fell on them. Another person was killed after being struck by a collapsing brick wall. Together, these two fatalities represented the only deaths associated with the Fort Worth tornado and the overall tornado outbreak. Several nearby metal buildings were toppled before the tornado once again crossed the Trinity River, entering Fort Worth's central business district. A tornado emergency, the second one ever issued, was declared for the city by the National Weather Service.

The tornado struck several skyscrapers as it moved across downtown Fort Worth over the course of approximately a minute between 6:25 p.m. CST (00:25 UTC) and 6:26 p.m. CST (00:26 UTC). The first high-rise building impacted was the nine-story Cash America building, which was nearly destroyed by the tornado. All windows on the building's northwestern and southwestern faces were blown out by the strong winds, and the travertine stone façade framing the building's exterior crumbled. While a number of interior partition walls and suspended ceilings collapsed, the building's steel frame remained intact. The tornado also peeled some of the brick masonry off the dome and five-story prayer tower of a nearby Baptist church. The tornado was at its peak strength when it struck the ten-story Mallick Tower, causing the building to lose most of its glass exterior. High-speed debris thrown up by the tornado broke windows in adjacent low-rise office and condominium buildings. Similar damage occurred to several other high-rises including the 35-story Bank One Tower, which lost 80 percent of its 3,000 windows; the Union Pacific Resources Building lost 1,300 of its 5,000 windows. (Note: The Union Resources Building was built as Continental Plaza in 1982 and was renamed after Union Pacific Resources became the building's principal tenant in 1998. The same skyscraper was renamed the Carter Burgess Plaza in 2000 and then 777 Main in 2012.)

The tornado eventually dissipated at 6:28 p.m. CST (00:28 UTC) near I-35W after having spent 10 minutes on the ground over a 4 mi (6.4 km) path and 250 yd (230 m) wide path. Across Fort Worth, 212 homes were damaged, of which 28 were destroyed. Although the tornado dissipated just east of downtown Fort Worth, the parent supercell thunderstorm continued to cause damage, albeit minor and sporadic, to roofs, trees, fences, and billboards roughly 3 mi (4.8 km) near I-30 and Brentwood Stair Road.

== See also ==
- List of tornadoes striking downtown areas
- December 2015 North American storm complex
- Tornado outbreak of April 3, 2012
- April 1994 tornado outbreak
