= Temple Christian School =

Temple Christian School may refer to:

- Temple Christian School (Titusville, Florida)
- Temple Christian School (Dayton, Ohio)
- Temple Christian School (Lima, Ohio)
- Temple Christian School (Mansfield, Ohio)
- Temple Christian School (Fort Worth, Texas), a school in Woodhaven, Fort Worth, Texas
