= Castleberry =

Castleberry may refer to:

- Castleberry, Alabama, a town in Conecuh County, Alabama, United States
- Castleberry Hill, a neighborhood in central Atlanta, located southwest of the Central Business District
- Castleberry Independent School District, a public school district based in River Oaks, Texas (USA)
- Castleberry, Florence Jean, better known "Flo", is a fictional character in the movie Alice Doesn't Live Here Anymore
- Castleberry, Bruce, former Guitarist of Vallejo (band)
- Castleberry's Food Company, an Augusta, GA-based canned food company
- Clint Castleberry, football player and Georgia Tech's only retired football jersey
