= Lake Worth High School (Texas) =

Coordinates: 32.8199°N 97.4175°W

Location
- 4210 Boat Club Rd; Lake Worth, Texas 76135-2899; United States

Information
- School type: Public high school
- School district: Lake Worth Independent School District
- Principal: Luciano Castro
- Teaching staff: 66.06 (FTE)
- Grades: 9-12
- Enrollment: 996 (2022–23)
- Student to teacher ratio: 15.08
- Colors: Green, black, and white
- Athletics conference: UIL Class AAAA
- Mascot: Bullfrog
- Website: Lake Worth High School

Lake Worth High School is a public high school located in the city of Lake Worth, Texas, in Tarrant County, United States and classified as a 4A school by the UIL. It is a part of the Lake Worth Independent School District located in west central Tarrant County. In 2013, the school was rated "Met Standard" by the Texas Education Agency.

== Athletics ==
The Lake Worth Bullfrogs compete in these sports -

Volleyball, Cross Country, Football, Basketball, Powerlifting, Tennis, Track, Baseball, Softball and Soccer

=== State Titles ===
- Boys Basketball
  - 1965(2A), 1966(2A)
