= Wedgwood, Fort Worth, Texas =

Neighborhood in Fort Worth, Texas

Coordinates: 32.651°N 97.403°W

Wedgwood is a neighborhood in Fort Worth, Texas (USA), located on the southwest part of the city. It is bounded by Granbury Rd on the northwest, Altamesa Blvd on the south, McCart Ave & Westcreek Dr on the east, and Interstate 20 on the north.

Most of the streets in Wedgwood begin with a "W", such as Wedgmont, Wrigley and Winifred. Few of the streets have sidewalks. Houses in Wedgwood are usually all brick with attached garages, and have ranch-style design. Fort Worth residents know Wedgwood as "being near Hulen Mall". Newer houses are located near Candleridge Park. Another park, Le Blanc Park, features tennis courts, soccer fields and a basketball court. The Candleridge community is a middle class area where the houses were built from 1975 to 1981. The nearby man-made lake sets a relaxing mood; most homes price anywhere from $122-400,000.

== Schools ==
The school zone is the neighborhood Fort Worth Independent School District.

=== Elementary schools ===
- Bruce Shulkey Elementary School
- J. T. Stevens Elementary School
- Westcreek Elementary School
- Trinity Valley School (Private)
- Southwest Christian School (Private)

=== Middle schools ===
- Wedgwood Middle School
- Wedgwood 6th Grade School
- Trinity Valley School (Private)
- Southwest Christian School (Private)

=== High schools ===
- Southwest High School
- Trinity Valley School (Private)
- Southwest Christian School (Private)
- Fort Worth Academy of Fine Arts (Charter)
- Fort Worth Country Day School (Private)

== See also ==
- List of neighborhoods in Fort Worth, Texas
