= Garden Acres =

Garden Acres may refer to:

- Garden Acres, California
- Garden Acres, Indiana
- Garden Acres, Texas
