= Bisbee =

Bisbee may refer to:

- Bisbee, Arizona
  - Bisbee Blue, turquoise from Bisbee, Arizona
  - Bisbee Deportation, the illegal expulsion of 1,300 miners from Bisbee, Arizona (1917)
  - Bisbee Riot, gunfight between black Buffalo Soldiers and local police in Bisbee, Arizona (1919)
  - Bisbee massacre, payroll robbery and murder, followed by hangings, in Bisbee, Arizona (1883)
- Bisbee, North Dakota
- Bisbee, Texas

== People ==
- Clark Bisbee (1949–2023), American politician
- Dave Bisbee (born 1946), American judge and politician
- Eleanor Bisbee (1893–1956), American journalist, philosopher, college professor
- Jasper Bisbee (1843–1935), American musician
- John Bisbee (born 1965), American sculptor
- Sam Bisbee, American independent film producer and composer
- William Henry Bisbee (1840–1942), United States Army general
