= Central Handley Historic District =

Historic district in Texas, United States

- Central Handley Historical District
- U.S. National Register of Historic Places
- U.S. Historic district
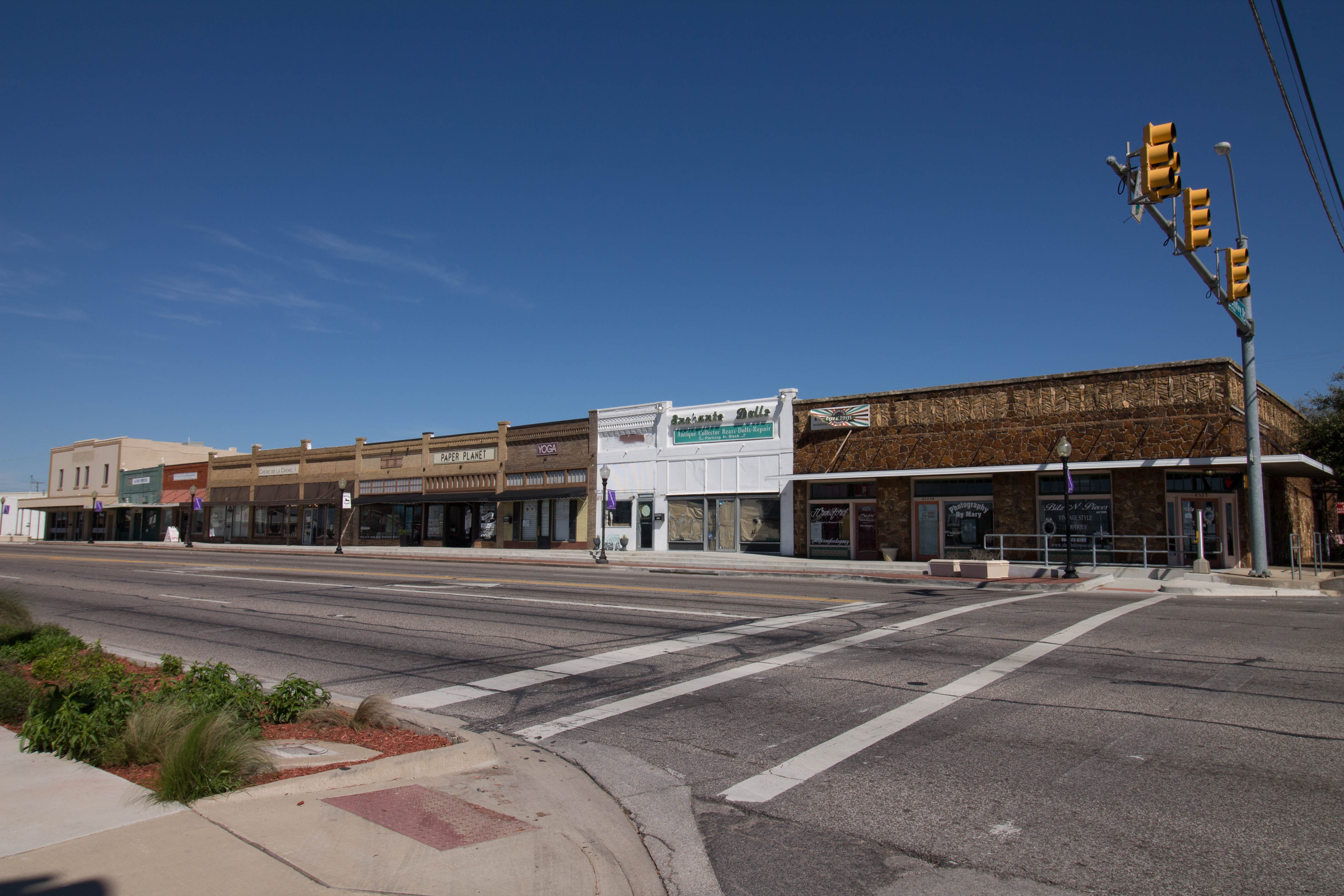
- E. Lancaster Ave. commercial row in 2016

- Location within Texas Location within the United States
- Location: Roughly bounded by E. Lancaster Ave., Forest Ave., Kerr St., and Handley Dr., Fort Worth, Texas
- Coordinates: 32°43′58″N 97°13′8″W
- Area: 3 acres (1.2 ha)
- Built: 1946
- Architect: B.B. Adams, et.al.
- Architectural style: Early Commercial, Late Victorian
- NRHP reference No.: 01001472
- Added to NRHP: January 17, 2002

The Central Handley Historic District is located in Handley, Fort Worth, Texas, seven miles east of downtown. The district was the commercial center of the unincorporated small town of Handley (ca. 1910 to 1951) which was subsequently annexed into the city of Fort Worth, Texas in 1946.

Platted in 1885 by the Texas & Pacific Railway, the growth of the town was influenced by the presence of the railroad and the arrival of the Northern Texas Traction Company’s Interurban streetcar system operating between Fort Worth and Dallas in 1902. As the location of the traction company's power plant and car barns, the town became home to employees of both the Northern Texas Traction Company and the T&P.

The Central Handley Historic District was oriented on the north side of the railway reservation with the depot located along the southern border of the district. The businesses within the district served not only the local residents and area farmers but the commuters who traveled on the railroad and the Interurban.

It was named for James Madison Handley, a Georgia native and veteran of the U.S. Civil War.

It was added to the National Register on January 17, 2002.

== Photo gallery ==
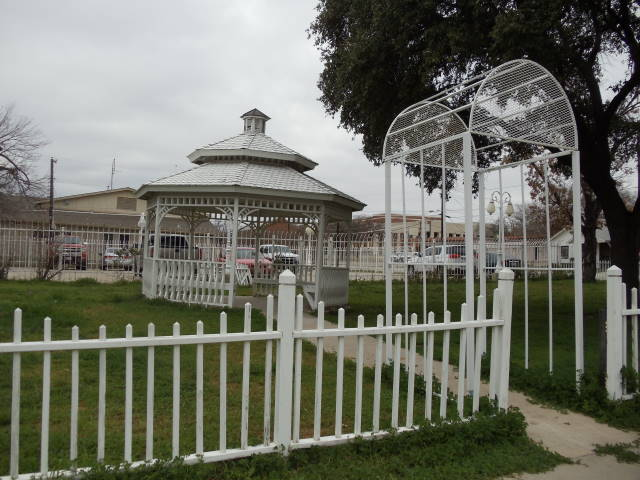

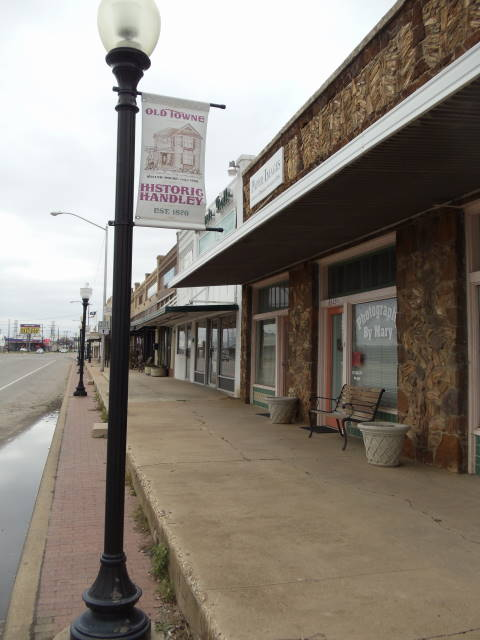

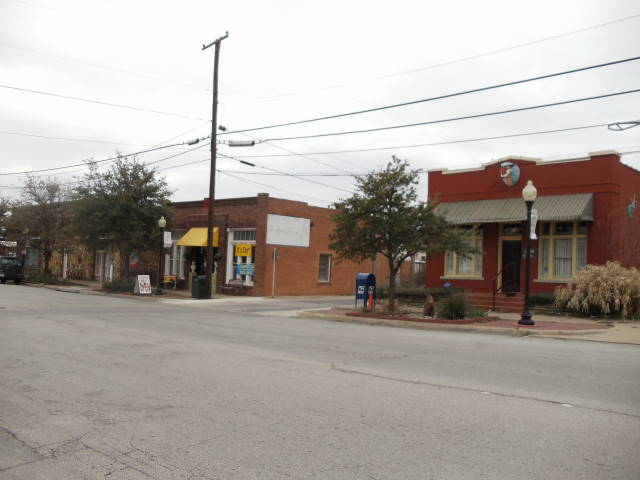

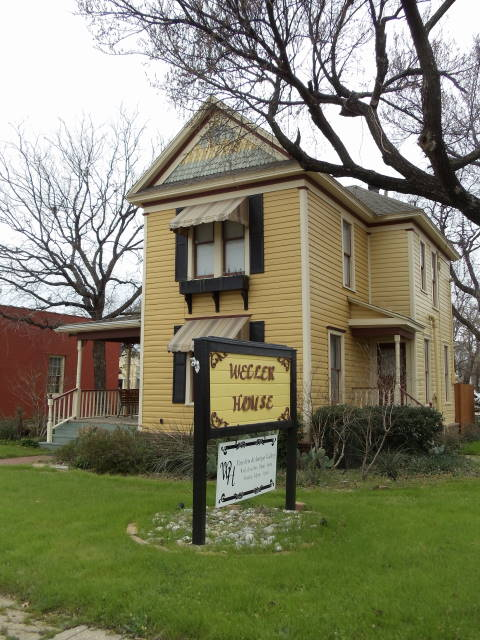

== See also ==
- National Register of Historic Places listings in Tarrant County, Texas
