= Doug Hart =

American football player (1939–2020)

No. 43
- Positions: Cornerback, Safety

Personal information
- Born: June 6, 1939; Handley, Texas, U.S.
- Died: January 1, 2020 (aged 80); Minneapolis, Minnesota, U.S.
- Listed height: 6 ft 0 in (1.83 m)
- Listed weight: 190 lb (86 kg)

Career information
- High school: Fort Worth (TX) Handley
- College: Arlington State
- NFL draft: 1963: undrafted

Career history
- St. Louis Cardinals (1963)*; Green Bay Packers (1963–1971)
- * Offseason or practice squad member only

Awards and highlights
- 2× Super Bowl champion (I, II); 3× NFL champion (1965–1967)

Career NFL statistics
- Interceptions: 15
- INT yards: 436
- Fumble recoveries: 5
- Stats at Pro Football Reference

Douglas Wayne Hart (June 6, 1939 – January 1, 2020) was an American professional football player, a defensive back who played eight seasons for the Green Bay Packers of the National Football League.

== Football career ==
Born and raised in Handley, Texas, which was later annexed by Fort Worth, Hart played high school football at Handley High School in Fort Worth. He played two years of junior college football at Navarro College, then walked on at Arlington State College (now University of Texas at Arlington) and earned a football scholarship.

Unselected in the 1963 NFL draft and AFL draft, Hart was signed as a free agent by the St. Louis Cardinals, who waived him in training camp. He was picked up on waivers by the Packers in and spent all of that 1963 season on the Packers' taxi squad, but played in every Packers game from 1964 through 1971; he retired in training camp in August 1972 at age 33.

In his NFL career as a cornerback and safety, Hart had 15 interceptions. In 1969, he scored a touchdown on an 85-yard interception return against the Minnesota Vikings at Milwaukee County Stadium; it was the longest interception return in the NFL that season. As of 2011, his five defensive touchdowns were tied for fourth place all-time for the Packers. Hart was part of the Packer teams that won an unprecedented three consecutive NFL championships, which concluded with the first two Super Bowls.

While with the Packers, Hart lived in Green Bay year-round and the outdoor-minded Texan embraced winter sports, taking up alpine skiing and snowmobile racing. He won races on an Arctic Cat snowmobile, a company that he would later serve as vice president.

== Hart and Vince Lombardi ==
Legendary Packers coach Vince Lombardi signed Hart to play for Green Bay after Hart had been cut by the Cardinals and had gone to work for Bell Helicopter for two days. After playing for the Packers in an exhibition game in Dallas, the Packers brought him up to Green Bay, where he was pleased to sign a contract: "Lombardi said I was going to be on the taxi squad as a rookie for $500 a week. That was more money than I'd ever seen in my life."

As was the case with many of his players, Lombardi left a lasting impression upon Hart: "I think of Coach Lombardi and his philosophies in one way or another almost every day...He taught us to do your very best at whatever you're doing. He always said, 'When you walk off this field, you want to have those people in the stands say they just saw the very best playing at their very best.' " In a 2013 interview, Hart said of his former coach, "He was a humane person, he really was...He was big and strong and he could get very hard (with people) sometimes, but when a person needed help he was available." Hart's teammate, guard Jerry Kramer, specifically mentioned Hart in an op-ed article he wrote for The New York Times in 1997: "Max McGee, too, is a wealthy businessman (he founded Chi-Chi's, the chain of Mexican restaurants). So are Paul Hornung, Bart Starr, Doug Hart and a dozen others who didn't leave the game as rich men. All are still driven by Lombardi -- not because he ranted and raved but because he wanted desperately to see us do well."

== Post-football career ==
After his playing career, Hart was a successful businessman. He was an Arctic Cat distributor in Neenah and later a vice president for the snowmobile manufacturer, and COO of Satellite Industries, a portable toilet manufacturer. He also ran a textile factory and, late in his career, became a licensed fly fishing guide in Florida. He moved back to Minnesota in 2007 to be closer to his children and grandchildren. Hart died on January 1, 2020, at the age of 80.
