= Crawford Farms, Fort Worth, Texas =

Neighborhood in Fort Worth, Texas

Coordinates: 32.92372°N 97.30155°W

Crawford Farms is a neighborhood that is located in north Fort Worth, Texas and is generally bound by Golden Triangle on the north and Old Denton Road on the west. It is adjacent to the Sunset Hills, Heritage, and Vista Meadows neighborhoods. Timberview Middle School is physically located adjacent to the Crawford Farms neighborhood.

It is a 1,072 home residential community with an abundance of amenities. Homeowner Association membership is automatic when purchasing a home within Crawford Farms.

== Awards ==
- 2016 Mayor's Health and Wellness Award, Fort Worth Neighborhood Award
- 2016 Neighborhood Newsletter Award, Fort Fort Worth Neighborhood Award

== Education ==
The neighborhood is zoned to schools in the Keller ISD and is served by:

- Eagle Ridge Elementary School, Fort Worth
- Timberview Middle School, Fort Worth
- Timber Creek High School, Fort Worth

== Neighborhood Gallery ==
Main Entrance

Fishing Pond

Swimming Pool

Walking Trails

Basketball Courts

Playground

Outdoor Gym

Tennis Court

Ducks in the Pond

Flag Displays on Holidays

== Recreation ==
The community provides several amenities, including swimming pools, a covered playground, walking trails, an outdoor basketball court, an outdoor tennis court, a fishing pond, and an outdoor gym.

== See also ==
- List of Neighborhoods in Fort Worth, Texas
