= Tarrant County, Texas =

County in Texas, United States

- County
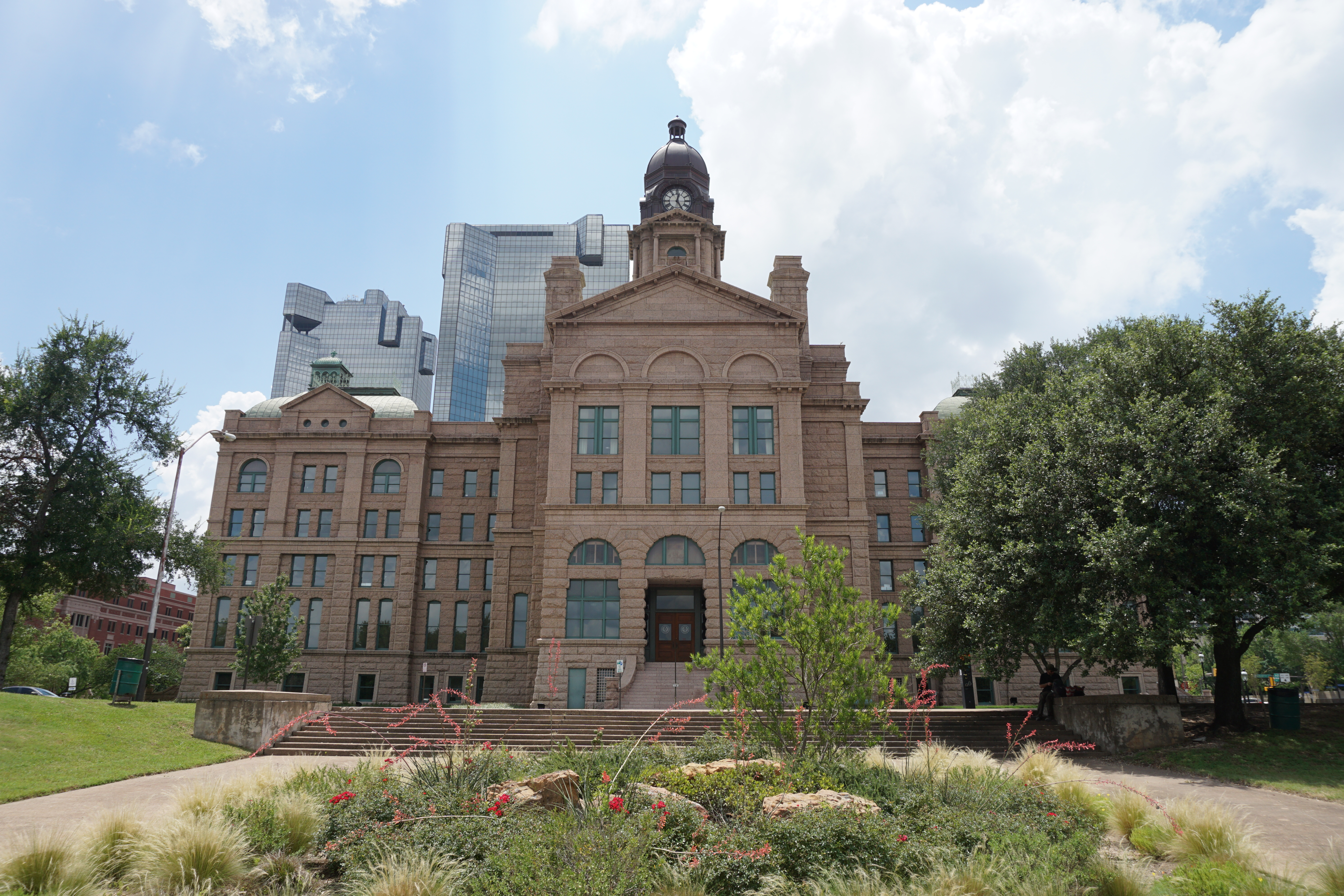
- Tarrant County Courthouse

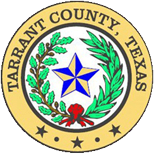
- Flag Seal

- Location within the U.S. state of Texas
- Coordinates: 32°46′N 97°17′W
- Country: United States
- State: Texas
- Founded: 1850
- Named for: Edward H. Tarrant
- Seat: Fort Worth
- Largest city: Fort Worth

Area
  - Total: 902 sq mi (2,340 km^{2})
  - Land: 864 sq mi (2,240 km^{2})
  - Water: 39 sq mi (100 km^{2}) 4.3%

Population (2020)
  - Total: 2,110,640
  - Estimate (2025): 2,248,466 ▲
  - Density: 2,440/sq mi (943/km^{2})

GDP
  - Total: $178.003 billion (2024)
- Time zone: UTC−6 (Central)
  - Summer (DST): UTC−5 (CDT)
- Congressional districts: 6th, 12th, 24th, 25th, 30th, 33rd
- Website: www.tarrantcountytx.gov

Tarrant County is a county located in the U.S. state of Texas with a 2020 U.S. census population of 2,110,640, making it the third-most populous county in Texas and the 15th-most populous in the United States. Its county seat and largest city is Fort Worth. Tarrant County, one of 26 counties created out of the Peters Colony, was established in 1849 and organized the next year. It is named after Edward H. Tarrant, a lawyer, politician, prosperous landowner and slaveholder, and militia leader.

The ancestral homelands of the Caddo, Tonkawa, Comanche, and Cherokee Native Americans covered Tarrant County. The Native American tribes resisted settlement and fought to defend their land. The Battle of Village Creek is a well-known battle that took place in Tarrant County.

== Geography ==
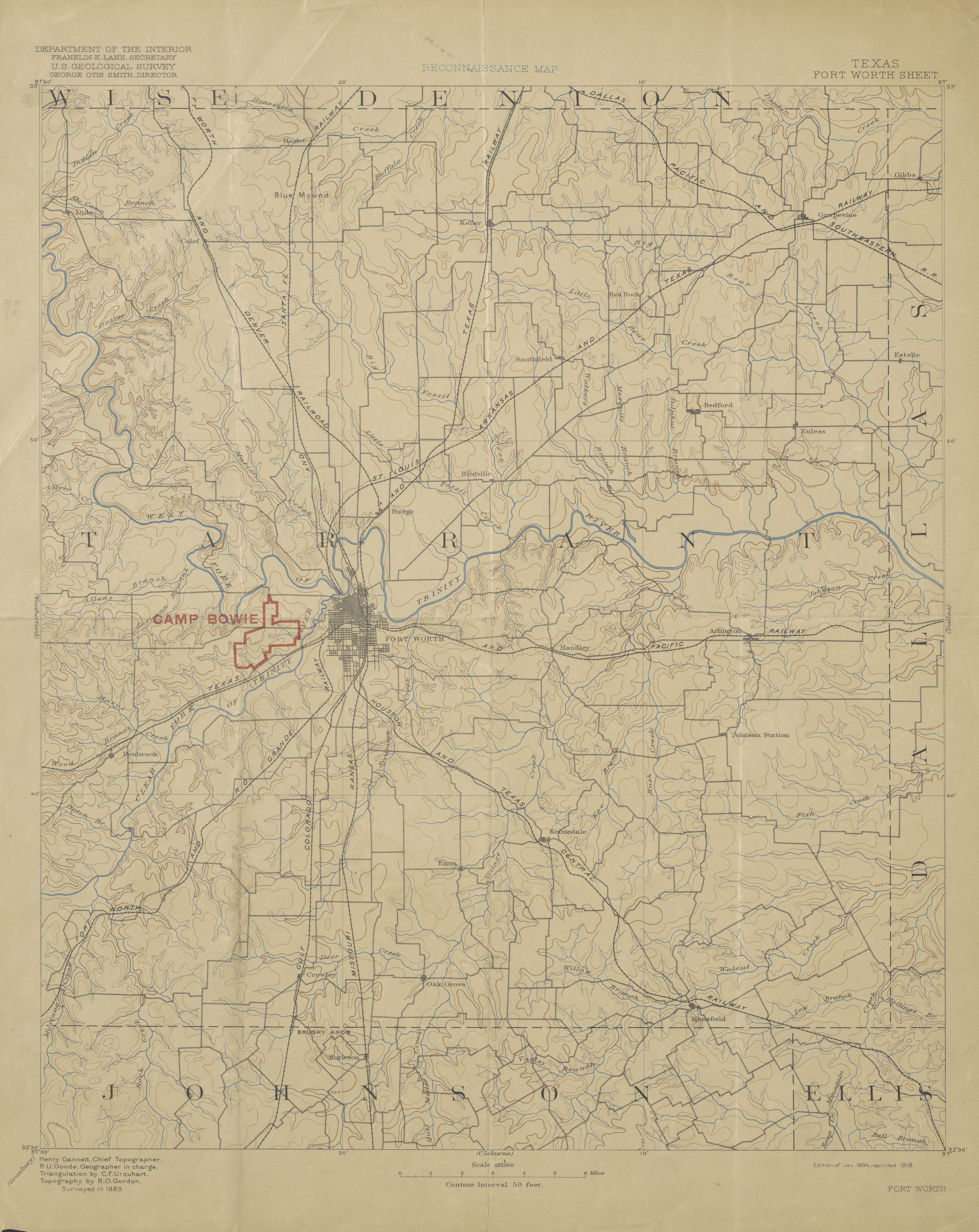
USGS map of Tarrant County, 1894

According to the U.S. Census Bureau, the county has an area of 902 square miles (2,340 km^{2}), of which 864 square miles (2,240 km^{2}) is land and 39 square miles (100 km^{2}), or 4.3%, is water.

=== Adjacent counties ===
- Denton County (north)
- Dallas County (east)
- Ellis County (southeast)
- Johnson County (south)
- Parker County (west)
- Wise County (northwest)

== Communities ==
=== Cities in multiple counties ===
- Azle (partly in Parker County)
- Burleson (mostly in Johnson County)
- Crowley (small part in Johnson County)
- Fort Worth (county seat and largest city; has small parts in Denton, Johnson, Parker and Wise counties)
- Grand Prairie (partly in Dallas County and a small part in Ellis County)
- Grapevine (small part in Dallas, and part of Grapevine Lake in Denton County)
- Haslet (small part in Denton County)
- Mansfield (small parts in Ellis and Johnson counties)
- Newark (mostly in Wise County)
- Reno (almost entirely in Parker County)
- Roanoke (almost entirely in Denton County)
- Southlake (small part in Denton County)

=== Cities ===
- Arlington
- Bedford
- Blue Mound
- Colleyville
- Dalworthington Gardens
- Euless
- Everman
- Forest Hill
- Haltom City
- Hurst
- Keller
- Kennedale
- Lake Worth
- North Richland Hills
- Pelican Bay
- Richland Hills
- River Oaks
- Saginaw
- Sansom Park
- Watauga
- Westworth Village
- White Settlement

=== Towns ===
- Benbrook
- Edgecliff Village
- Flower Mound (mostly in Denton County)
- Lakeside
- Pantego
- Trophy Club (mostly in Denton County)
- Westlake (small part in Denton County)
- Westover Hills

=== Census-designated places ===
- Briar (partly in Wise and Parker counties)
- Pecan Acres (small part in Wise County)
- Rendon

=== Historical census-designated places ===
- Eagle Mountain

=== Unincorporated communities ===
- Alliance (partly in Denton County)
- Avondale
- Boss
- Eagle Acres
- Lake Crest Estates
- Lake Forest
- Lake Shore Estates

=== Historical communities ===
- Birdville
- Bisbee
- Bransford
- Center Point
- Ederville
- Garden Acres
- Handley
- Johnsons Station

=== Ghost towns ===
- Birds
- Dido
- Minters Chapel

=== Notes ===
- Italics indicate that the city is a principal city of DFW or a county seat.
- The term "town" is used only in reference to relative population. Under Texas law, all incorporated places are officially designated "cities".

== Demographics ==
Historical population
Census	Pop.	Note	%±
1850	664		—
1860	6,020		806.6%
1870	5,788		−3.9%
1880	24,671		326.2%
1890	41,142		66.8%
1900	52,376		27.3%
1910	108,572		107.3%
1920	152,800		40.7%
1930	197,553		29.3%
1940	225,521		14.2%
1950	361,253		60.2%
1960	538,495		49.1%
1970	716,317		33.0%
1980	860,880		20.2%
1990	1,170,103		35.9%
2000	1,446,219		23.6%
2010	1,809,034		25.1%
2020	2,110,640		16.7%
2025 (est.)	2,248,466	▲	6.5%
U.S. Decennial Census; 1850–2010 2010–2019

=== Racial and ethnic composition ===
Tarrant County, Texas – Racial and ethnic composition Note: the US Census treats Hispanic/Latino as an ethnic category. This table excludes Latinos from the racial categories and assigns them to a separate category. Hispanics/Latinos may be of any race.
Race / Ethnicity (NH = Non-Hispanic)	Pop 1980	Pop 1990	Pop 2000	Pop 2010	Pop 2020	% 1980	% 1990	% 2000	% 2010	% 2020
White alone (NH)	679,883	857,272	895,253	937,135	904,884	78.98%	73.26%	61.90%	51.80%	42.87%
Black or African American alone (NH)	100,537	138,302	182,713	262,522	358,645	11.68%	11.82%	12.63%	14.51%	16.99%
Native American or Alaska Native alone (NH)	3,050	4,921	5,971	7,037	7,033	0.35%	0.42%	0.41%	0.39%	0.33%
Asian alone (NH)	6,465	28,676	52,057	83,378	127,783	0.75%	2.45%	3.60%	4.61%	6.05%
Native Hawaiian or Pacific Islander alone (NH)	x	x	2,042	2,938	4,147	x	x	0.14%	0.16%	0.20%
Other race alone (NH)	3,313	1,053	1,540	2,491	8,321	0.38%	0.09%	0.11%	0.14%	0.39%
Mixed race or Multiracial (NH)	x	x	21,353	30,556	78,920	x	x	1.48%	1.69%	3.74%
Hispanic or Latino (any race)	67,632	139,879	285,290	482,977	620,907	7.86%	11.95%	19.73%	26.70%	29.42%
Total	860,880	1,170,103	1,446,219	1,809,034	2,110,640	100.00%	100.00%	100.00%	100.00%	100.00%

=== Population history ===
Since the 1850 United States census, Tarrant County has experienced population growth except for the 1870 census; in 1850, the county had a population of 664, growing to 1,170,103 at the 1990 census. By the 2020 census, the county's population grew to 2,110,640. Tarrant County is the second-most populous county in the Metroplex, behind Dallas County.

=== 2020 census ===
As of the 2020 census, the county had a population of 2,110,640. The median age was 35.2 years. 25.4% of residents were under the age of 18 and 12.2% of residents were 65 years of age or older. For every 100 females there were 95.6 males, and for every 100 females age 18 and over there were 93.0 males age 18 and over.

The racial makeup of the county was 49.5% White, 17.4% Black or African American, 0.9% American Indian and Alaska Native, 6.1% Asian, 0.2% Native Hawaiian and Pacific Islander, 11.9% from some other race, and 14.0% from two or more races. Hispanic or Latino residents of any race comprised 29.4% of the population.

Meanwhile, 42.87% of residents were non-Hispanic white, 29.42% were Hispanic or Latino American of any race, 16.99% were Black or African American, 6.05% were Asian alone, 0.33% were American Indian and Alaska Native, 0.20% were Pacific Islander, 0.39% were some other race, and 3.74% were multiracial.

Its increasing racial and ethnic diversity has reflected growing trends of diversification in Texas.

98.8% of residents lived in urban areas, while 1.2% lived in rural areas.

There were 760,739 households in the county, of which 36.4% had children under the age of 18 living in them. Of all households, 48.3% were married-couple households, 18.2% were households with a male householder and no spouse or partner present, and 27.4% were households with a female householder and no spouse or partner present. About 24.6% of all households were made up of individuals and 7.9% had someone living alone who was 65 years of age or older.

There were 808,364 housing units, of which 5.9% were vacant. Among occupied housing units, 58.7% were owner-occupied and 41.3% were renter-occupied. The homeowner vacancy rate was 1.2% and the rental vacancy rate was 8.3%.

=== 2010 census ===
As of the 2010 census, there were about 5.2 same-sex couples per 1,000 households in the county.

=== 2000 census ===
In 2000, the racial and ethnic makeup of the county was 71.2% White, 12.8% Black or African American, 0.6% Native American, 3.6% Asian, 0.2% Pacific Islander, 9.1% from other races, and 2.5% from two or more races; 19.7% of the population were Hispanic or Latino of any race.

In 2000, there were 533,864 households, out of which 36.8% had children under the age of 18 living with them, 52.6% were married couples living together, 12.2% had a female householder with no husband present, and 30.8% were non-families. 24.9% of all households were made up of individuals, and 5.9% had someone living alone who was 65 years of age or older. The average household size was 2.67 and the average family size was 3.22.

In 2000, 28.1% of the county's population was under the age of 18, 10.0% was from 18 to 24, 33.5% from 25 to 44, 20.1% from 45 to 64, and 8.3% was 65 years of age or older. The median age was 32 years. For every 100 females, there were 98.10 males. For every 100 females age 18 and over, there were 95.6 males.

In 2000, the median income for a household in the county was $46,179, and the median income for a family was $54,068. Males had a median income of $38,486 versus $28,672 for females. The per capita income for the county was $22,548. About 8.0% of families and 10.6% of the population were below the poverty line, including 13.8% of those under age 18 and 8.7% of those age 65 or over. According to the 2021 census estimates, the median income for a household in the county was $71,346.

=== American Community Survey 2025 data ===
The United States Census Bureau estimated that in 2025, Tarrant County’s population was 2,248,466. It was also estimated that the county's population was 39.11% Non-Hispanic White, 31.86% Hispanic or Latino, 18.04% Non-Hispanic Black, 7.02% Asian, 0.33% Native American, 0.22% Pacific Islander, and 3.42% Multiracial.

Total	Population	Percentage
Non-Hispanic White	879,453	39.11%
Hispanic or Latino	716,285	31.86%
Non-Hispanic Black	405,700	18.04%
Asian	157,857	7.02%
Native American	7,424	0.33%
Pacific Islander	4,839	0.22%
Non-Hispanic Multiracial	76,908	3.42%

== Government, courts, and politics ==
=== Government ===
Tarrant County, like all Texas counties, is governed by a Commissioners Court. The court consists of the county judge, who is elected county-wide and presides over the full court, and four commissioners, who are elected in each of the county's four precincts.

In May 2025, when there were two Democrats and two Republicans on the Tarrant County Commissioners Court, County Judge Tim O'Hare declared that the ongoing process of redistricting Tarrant County precincts was "purely 100% about partisan politics", as he detailed that "my plan and what I campaigned on openly and publicly, dating as far back as May 2021", is to "pass a map that guarantees, or comes as close as you can to guarantee, three Republican commissioners" in Tarrant County out of four, as O'Hare thought that "Tarrant County would be better served if we have strong Republican leadership".

==== County Judge and Commissioners ====
Office	Name	Party
County Judge	Tim O'Hare	Republican
County Commissioner, Precinct 1	Roderick Miles	Democratic
County Commissioner, Precinct 2	Alisa Simmons	Democratic
County Commissioner, Precinct 3	Matt Krause	Republican
County Commissioner, Precinct 4	Manny Ramirez	Republican

==== County officials ====
Office	Name	Party
Criminal District Attorney	Phil Sorrells	Republican
District Clerk	Thomas A. Wilder	Republican
County Clerk	Mary Louise Nicholson	Republican
Sheriff	Bill E. Waybourn	Republican
Tax Assessor-Collector	Rick Barnes	Republican

==== Constables ====
Office	Name	Party
Constable, Precinct 1	Dale Clark	Republican
Constable, Precinct 2	David Woodruff	Republican
Constable, Precinct 3	Darrell Huffman	Republican
Constable, Precinct 4	Joe D. "Jody" Johnson	Republican
Constable, Precinct 5	Pedro Munoz	Democratic
Constable, Precinct 6	Jon H. Siegel	Republican
Constable, Precinct 7	Sandra Lee	Democratic
Constable, Precinct 8	Michael R. Campbell	Democratic

==== County services ====
The JPS Health Network (Tarrant County Hospital District) operates the John Peter Smith Hospital and health centers.

Countywide law enforcement is provided by the Tarrant County Sheriff's Office and Tarrant County Constable's Office. All cities in the county provide their own police services, with three exceptions: Westlake contracts service from the Keller Police Department, and Haslet and Edgecliff Village contract service from the Sheriff's Office. DFW Airport, the Tarrant County Hospital District, and the Tarrant Regional Water District also provide their own police forces. Unincorporated parts of the county are served by Tarrant County Sheriff's Office.

All municipalities provide their own fire departments, the largest being Fort Worth Fire Department. Fire protection services for unincorporated areas are provided by Tarrant County ESD 1. The district initially operated as a funding and administrative agency after transitioning from the previous Tarrant County Rural Fire Protection District in 1996. Beginning in 2025, the ESD began to assume direct responsibility for Fire and EMS. Briar-Reno Fire Department was the first fire department to be absorbed, which dissolved and became Briar Station 370, along with a new fire station at the US 377 and FM 1187 corridor, locally known as Whiskey Flats Station 570.

On April 1, 2026, Tarrant County ESD absorbed Eagle Mountain Volunteer Fire Department and Rendon Fire Department, becoming Stations 170 and 770, respectively. This change left the ESD as a 4 station department covering 183 square miles of unincorporated Tarrant County and more than 50,000 persons. The ESD contracts with other Fire Departments for automatic aid for ambulance services in Briar (provided by Azle Fire Department) and Whiskey Flats (provided by Benbrook Fire Department). Eagle Mountain and Rendon maintain two staffed ambulances for each of their districts. All ambulances are staffed with a minimum of one paramedic.

Most cities also operate their own ambulances, with two notable exceptions: Fort Worth and 14 other Tarrant County cities are served by the Metropolitan Area EMS Authority (MAEMSA), a governmental administrative agency established under an interlocal operating agreement and operating as MedStar Mobile Health. Since July 2025, MedStar was absorbed by Fort Worth Fire Department, which trains all firefighters to the EMT-Basic level. Coverage remained largely the same, with member cities still receiving EMS services from Fort Worth Fire Department, while major reorganization occurred to staffing, administration, and recruiting of new members.

The city of Arlington contracts paramedic apparatus from private entity American Medical Response. Arlington Fire Department firefighters are trained to a minimum of Advanced EMT level.

CareFlite air ambulance services operate from Harris Methodist Hospital in Fort Worth.

As of 2026, Tarrant County is the largest county by population in the United States with no public defender.

=== Courts ===
==== Justices of the Peace ====
Office	Name	Party
Justice of the Peace, Precinct 1	Ralph Swearingin Jr.	Republican
Justice of the Peace, Precinct 2	Mary Tom Curnutt	Republican
Justice of the Peace, Precinct 3	Bill Brandt	Republican
Justice of the Peace, Precinct 4	Chris Gregory	Republican
Justice of the Peace, Precinct 5	Sergio L. De Leon	Democratic
Justice of the Peace, Precinct 6	Jason M. Charbonnet	Republican
Justice of the Peace, Precinct 7	Kenneth Sanders	Democratic
Justice of the Peace, Precinct 8	Lisa R. Woodard	Democratic

==== County criminal courts ====
Office	Name	Party
County Criminal Court No. 1	David Cook	Republican
County Criminal Court No. 2	Carey F. Walker	Republican
County Criminal Court No. 3	Bob McCoy	Republican
County Criminal Court No. 4	Deborah Nekhom	Republican
County Criminal Court No. 5	Brad Clark	Republican
County Criminal Court No. 6	Randi Hartin	Republican
County Criminal Court No. 7	Eric Starnes	Republican
County Criminal Court No. 8	Charles L. "Chuck" Vanover	Republican
County Criminal Court No. 9	Brian Bolton	Republican
County Criminal Court No. 10	Trent Loftin	Republican

==== County civil courts ====
Office	Name	Party
County Court at Law No. 1	Don Pierson	Republican
County Court at Law No. 2	Jennifer Rymell	Republican
County Court at Law No. 3	Mike Hrabal	Republican

==== County probate courts ====
Office	Name	Party
County Probate Court No. 1	Patricia Burns	Republican
County Probate Court No. 2	Brooke Allen	Republican

==== Criminal district courts ====
Office	Name	Party
Criminal District Court No. 1	Elizabeth H. Beach	Republican
Criminal District Court No. 2	Wayne Salvant	Republican
Criminal District Court No. 3	Douglas Allen	Republican
Criminal District Court No. 4	Andy Porter	Republican
213th District Court	Chris Wolfe	Republican
297th District Court	David C. Hagerman	Republican
371st District Court	Ryan Hill	Republican
372nd District Court	Julie Lugo	Republican
396th District Court	George Gallagher	Republican
432nd District Court	Ruben Gonzalez Jr.	Republican
485th District Court	Steven Jumes	Republican

==== Civil district courts ====
Office	Name	Party
17th District Court	Melody Wilkinson	Republican
48th District Court	Chris Taylor	Republican
67th District Court	Don Cosby	Republican
96th District Court	J. Patrick Gallagher	Republican
141st District Court	John P. Chupp	Republican
153rd District Court	Susan Heygood McCoy	Republican
236th District Court	Tom Lowe	Republican
342nd District Court	Kimberly Fitzpatrick	Republican
348th District Court	Megan Fahey	Republican
352nd District Court	Josh Burgess	Republican

==== Family district courts ====
Office	Name	Party
231st District Court	Jesus "Jesse" Nevarez Jr.	Republican
233rd District Court	Kenneth Newell	Republican
322nd District Court	James Munford	Republican
324th District Court	Beth Poulos	Republican
325th District Court	Cynthia Terry	Republican
360th District Court	Patricia Baca Bennett	Republican

==== Juvenile district court ====
Office	Name	Party
323rd District Court	Alex Kim	Republican

=== Politics ===
Since the 1950s, Tarrant County has been very conservative for an urban county, and is one of the most populous Republican-leaning counties in the nation. However, it elected Democrat Jim Wright to 17 terms (1955–1989) as U.S. Congressman and Speaker of the House (1987–1989), and Wright was succeeded by fellow Democrat Pete Geren (1989–1997). The county has become more competitive since the 2010s, and has voted to the left of Texas as a whole.

Beginning in 2016, the Democratic Party rebounded to represent a larger portion of the political profile and made huge gains in Tarrant County, concentrated in several areas throughout the county: eastern Euless, Grand Prairie and eastern and southern Arlington, northern and western areas of Mansfield, large portions of Fort Worth, particularly the area surrounding the Stockyards and Meacham Airport, southern and eastern Fort Worth, especially in dense metro areas and along I-35W, and Forest Hill.

Republicans are dominant in many of the rural areas of the county, downtown and western Fort Worth and north of Loop 820, and almost all suburban areas including Benbrook, rural Mansfield areas and western Arlington, Haltom City, Mid-Cities (Hurst, Euless, and Bedford), and the northern suburbs. Tarrant County has consistently voted Republican in gubernatorial elections since 1994.

The county has leaned Republican in United States Senate races since Democrat Lloyd Bentsen's 1988 victory, but in 2018 and 2024 Democratic U.S. Senate candidates carried Tarrant, though both lost statewide to incumbent Ted Cruz.

Joe Biden carried the county with 49.3% (to Donald Trump's 49.1%) in the 2020 presidential election, the first win for a Democratic presidential ticket in Tarrant County since Texas native Lyndon B. Johnson in 1964, and the closest such race in the county since at least 1912. Biden's margin over Trump was 1,826 votes; the next closest margin was in 1976, when Republican Gerald Ford carried Tarrant by 2,146 votes over Democrat Jimmy Carter. Many other suburban Texas counties, including Tarrant's immediate neighbors Denton and Collin, as well as those around Houston and Austin, showed similar trends between 2016 and 2020. However, in the 2024 election Tarrant County moved back in the Republican column, supporting Trump over Kamala Harris, 51.8% to 46.7%. This was still to the left of the state as a whole, which voted for Trump 56.1% to 42.4% in 2024.

From the 1893 beginning of U.S. House District 12, there have been two Republicans in 127 years elected to the U.S. House for the western half of Tarrant County; from the 1875 inception of U.S. House District 6, there have been three Republicans in 145 years elected to the U.S. House for the eastern portion of Tarrant County, including former congressman and senator Phil Gramm's election as both a Democrat and a Republican after he switched parties in 1983 to run for re-election. The first Republican elected to the State Senate from Tarrant County since Reconstruction was Betty Andujar in 1972.

United States presidential election results for Tarrant County, Texas
Year	Republican		Democratic		Third party(ies)	
Year	No.	%	No.	%	No.	%
1912	548	6.13%	7,222	80.79%	1,169	13.08%
1916	1,550	12.69%	10,269	84.08%	394	3.23%
1920	3,486	20.38%	12,431	72.66%	1,191	6.96%
1924	5,859	26.45%	13,673	61.73%	2,619	11.82%
1928	20,481	68.99%	9,208	31.01%	0	0.00%
1932	5,251	15.67%	27,836	83.06%	426	1.27%
1936	3,781	11.20%	29,791	88.24%	190	0.56%
1940	7,474	17.15%	36,062	82.73%	53	0.12%
1944	4,113	8.05%	36,791	72.05%	10,161	19.90%
1948	17,157	28.25%	36,325	59.81%	7,257	11.95%
1952	63,680	57.97%	45,968	41.85%	194	0.18%
1956	66,329	59.65%	43,922	39.50%	946	0.85%
1960	72,813	54.75%	59,385	44.66%	788	0.59%
1964	56,593	36.71%	97,092	62.98%	473	0.31%
1968	81,786	42.88%	79,705	41.79%	29,256	15.34%
1972	151,596	68.55%	69,187	31.29%	355	0.16%
1976	124,433	50.05%	122,287	49.18%	1,911	0.77%
1980	173,466	56.86%	121,068	39.69%	10,532	3.45%
1984	248,050	67.25%	120,147	32.57%	665	0.18%
1988	242,660	61.24%	151,310	38.19%	2,267	0.57%
1992	183,387	38.90%	156,230	33.14%	131,779	27.96%
1996	208,312	50.85%	170,431	41.60%	30,901	7.54%
2000	286,921	60.74%	173,758	36.78%	11,710	2.48%
2004	349,462	62.39%	207,286	37.01%	3,393	0.61%
2008	348,420	55.43%	274,880	43.73%	5,253	0.84%
2012	348,920	57.12%	253,071	41.43%	8,899	1.46%
2016	345,921	51.74%	288,392	43.14%	34,201	5.12%
2020	409,741	49.09%	411,567	49.31%	13,389	1.60%
2024	426,626	51.82%	384,501	46.70%	12,185	1.48%

United States Senate election results for Tarrant County, Texas
Year	Republican		Democratic		Third party(ies)	
Year	No.	%	No.	%	No.	%
2024	399,927	48.68%	401,742	48.91%	19,804	2.41%

United States Senate election results for Tarrant County, Texas2
Year	Republican		Democratic		Third party(ies)	
Year	No.	%	No.	%	No.	%
2020	423,117	51.08%	382,408	46.17%	22,771	2.75%
2026	287,783	39.50%	427,879	58.72%	12,968	1.78%

Texas Gubernatorial election results for Tarrant County
Year	Republican		Democratic		Third party(ies)	
Year	No.	%	No.	%	No.	%
2022	303,600	51.34%	279,423	47.25%	8,345	1.41%
2026	307,297	42.11%	410,931	56.31%	11,573	1.59%

==== State Board of Education members ====
District	Name	Party
District 11	Patricia Hardy	Republican
District 13	Erika Beltran	Democratic

==== State Representatives ====
District	Name	Party	Residence
90	Ramon Romero Jr.	Democratic	Fort Worth
91	David Lowe	Republican	Fort Worth
92	Salman Bhojani	Democratic	Euless
93	Nate Schatzline	Republican	Fort Worth
94	Tony Tinderholt	Republican	Arlington
95	Nicole Collier	Democratic	Fort Worth
96	David Cook	Republican	Arlington
97	John McQueeney	Republican	Fort Worth
98	Giovanni Capriglione	Republican	Southlake
99	Charlie Geren	Republican	River Oaks
101	Chris Turner	Democratic	Grand Prairie

==== State Senators ====
District	Name	Party	Residence
9	Taylor Rehmet	Democratic	Fort Worth
10	Phil King	Republican	Weatherford
12	Tan Parker	Republican	Flower Mound
22	Brian Birdwell	Republican	Granbury
23	Royce West	Democratic	Dallas

==== United States House of Representatives ====
District	Name	Party	Residence
Texas's 6th congressional district	Jake Ellzey	Republican	Waxahachie
Texas's 12th congressional district	Craig Goldman	Republican	Fort Worth
Texas's 24th congressional district	Beth Van Duyne	Republican	Irving
Texas's 25th congressional district	Roger Williams	Republican	Weatherford
Texas's 26th congressional district	Brandon Gill	Republican	Flower Mound
Texas's 30th congressional district	Jasmine Crockett	Democratic	Dallas
Texas's 33rd congressional district	Marc Veasey	Democratic	Fort Worth

==== United States Senate ====
Class	Name	Party	Residence
1	Ted Cruz	Republican	Houston
2	John Cornyn	Republican	Austin

== Education ==
=== Colleges and universities ===
Under the Texas Education Code, Tarrant County is the entire official service area of Tarrant County College (formerly Tarrant County Junior College).

Universities in Tarrant County include:

- University of Texas at Arlington
- Texas Christian University (Fort Worth)
- Texas A&M University School of Law (Fort Worth)
- Texas Wesleyan University (Fort Worth)
- Southwestern Baptist Theological Seminary (Fort Worth)

=== Primary and secondary schools ===
Public schools in Texas are organized into independent school districts and charter schools. Tarrant County is also home to dozens of private high schools and nearly 100 lower-level private schools.

==== Independent school districts ====
Those serving the county include:

- Arlington Independent School District
- Birdville Independent School District
- Carroll Independent School District
- Castleberry Independent School District
- Eagle Mountain-Saginaw Independent School District
- Everman Independent School District
- Fort Worth Independent School District
- Grapevine-Colleyville Independent School District (most)
- Hurst-Euless-Bedford Independent School District
- Keller Independent School District
- Kennedale Independent School District
- Lake Worth Independent School District
- White Settlement Independent School District
- Aledo Independent School District (partial)
- Azle Independent School District (partial)
- Burleson Independent School District (partial)
- Crowley Independent School District (partial)
- Godley Independent School District (partial)
- Lewisville Independent School District (partial)
- Mansfield Independent School District (partial)
- Northwest Independent School District (partial)

Masonic Home Independent School District formerly served a part of the county. In 2005 it merged into FWISD.

==== Charter schools ====
- Arlington Classics Academy
- Fort Worth Academy of Fine Arts
- IDEA Public Schools
- Harmony Public Schools
- Newman International Academy
- Texas School of the Arts
- Treetops School International
- Uplift Education (partial)
- Westlake Academy
- Great Hearts

==== Private schools ====
- Colleyville Covenant Christian Academy
- Fort Worth Christian School
- Fort Worth Country Day School
- Lake Country Christian School
- Nolan Catholic High School
- The Oakridge School
- Southwest Christian School
- Temple Christian School
- Trinity Valley School

== Transportation ==
=== Major highways ===
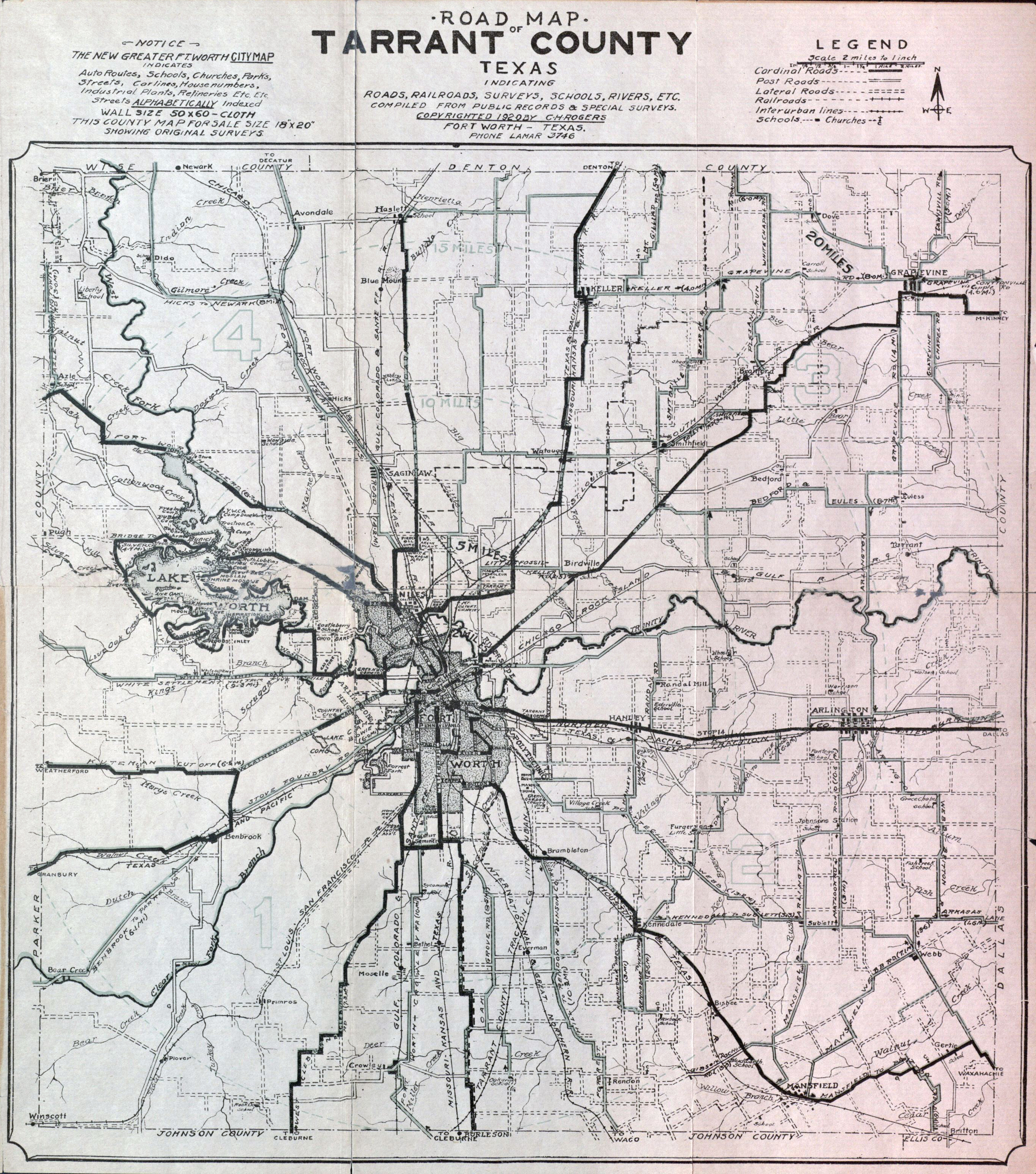
C. H. Rogers' Road Map of Tarrant County, 1920

- I-20
- I-30
- I-35W
- I-635
- I-820
- US 81
- US 287
- Bus. US 287
- US 377
- SH 10
- SH 26
- SH 114
- SH 121
- FM 156
- FM 157
- SH 161
- SH 170
- SH 180
- SH 183
- SH 360
- Loop 344
- Spur 280
- Spur 97
- Spur 303
- Spur 316
- Spur 341
- Spur 347
- Spur 465
- Spur 474
- Spur 580

=== Airports ===
Arlington Municipal Airport (Texas) is a city-owned public general aviation reliever airport located 5 miles south of downtown Arlington, at the intersection of Interstate 20 and Collins Road South. The airport has a single 6080' runway.

Dallas/Fort Worth International Airport is partially in the cities of Grapevine and Euless in Tarrant County and Irving in Dallas County.

Perot Field Fort Worth Alliance Airport is a city-owned public-use airport located 14 miles (23 km) north of the central business district of Fort Worth on Interstate-35W. Billed as the world's first purely industrial airport, it was developed in a joint venture between the City of Fort Worth, the Federal Aviation Administration and Hillwood Development Company, a real estate development company owned by H. Ross Perot Jr. The Airport has parallel 11,000' and 11,125' runways.

Fort Worth Meacham International Airport is located at the intersection of Interstate 820 and U.S. Business Highway 287 in northwest Fort Worth, 5 miles from the downtown business district. Meacham International Airport has two parallel runways.

Fort Worth Spinks Airport is located 14 miles south of the downtown business district. The airport is located at the intersection of Interstate-35W and HWY 1187 and serves as a reliever airport for Fort Worth Meacham International Airport and Dallas–Fort Worth International Airport.

Grand Prairie Municipal Airport is located at 5 miles southwest of Grand Prairie. It has a single 4001' runway.

== See also ==
- List of museums in North Texas
- National Register of Historic Places listings in Tarrant County, Texas
- Recorded Texas Historic Landmarks in Tarrant County
