= Mike Richardson (running back, born 1946) =

American football player (born 1946)

No. 24
- Position: Running back

Personal information
- Born: December 8, 1946 (age 79); Fort Worth, Texas, U.S.
- Listed height: 5 ft 11 in (1.80 m)
- Listed weight: 196 lb (89 kg)

Career information
- High school: Castleberry (Fort Worth)
- College: SMU (1965–1968)
- NFL draft: 1969: 7th round, 171st overall pick

Career history
- Houston Oilers (1969–1971); Winnipeg Blue Bombers (1972); Houston Texans/Shreveport Steamer (1974)

Awards and highlights
- First-team All-SWC (1968)

Career NFL/AFL statistics
- Rushing yards: 452
- Rushing average: 3.6
- Receptions: 38
- Receiving yards: 398
- Total touchdowns: 3
- Stats at Pro Football Reference

Michael Wayne Richardson (born December 8, 1946) is an American former professional football player who was a running back for three seasons with the Houston Oilers of the American Football League (AFL) and National Football League (NFL). He was selected by the Oilers in the seventh round of the 1969 NFL/AFL draft after playing college football for the SMU Mustangs. He also played for the Winnipeg Blue Bombers of the Canadian Football League (CFL) and the Houston Texans/Shreveport Steamer of the World Football League (WFL).

== Early life ==
Michael Wayne Richardson was born on December 8, 1946, in Fort Worth, Texas. He attended Castleberry High School in Fort Worth.

== College career ==
Richardson played college football for the SMU Mustangs of Southern Methodist University. He was on the freshman team in 1965 and a three-year letterman from 1966 to 1968. He rushed 81 times for 357 yards his sophomore year in 1966 while also catching six passes for 47 yards. In 1967, Richardson recorded 52 carries for 164 yards, and 22 receptions for 270 and two touchdowns. On November 10, 1968, against Texas A&M, he had a Southwest Conference (SWC) record 39 carries for a school-record 244 yards as SMU won 36–23. He also had three rushing touchdowns and one receiving touchdown during the game. Overall in 1968, Richardson totaled 207 rushing attempts for 1,034 yards and eight touchdowns, and 49 catches for 581 yards and three touchdowns, earning Associated Press first-team All-SWC honors. His 1,615 yards from scrimmage and 256 plays from scrimmage both led the SWC that year. Richardson was inducted into the school's athletics hall of fame in 1984.

== Professional career ==
Richardson was selected by the Houston Oilers in the seventh round, with the 171st overall pick, of the 1969 NFL draft. He played in all 14 games during his rookie year in 1969, rushing five times for 51 yards while also returning seven punts for 93 yards. He also appeared in one playoff game that year. Richardson played in all 14 games for the second consecutive season, starting seven, in 1970, recording 103 carries for 368 yards and two touchdowns, 34 receptions for 381 yards and one touchdown, and ten punt returns for 30 yards. He appeared in seven games during the 1971 season, totaling 17 rushing attempts for 33 yards, four catches for 17 yards, and one kick return for 26 yards.

Richardson played in five games for the Winnipeg Blue Bombers of the Canadian Football League in 1972, rushing 24 times for 109 yards while also catching one pass for 13 yards.

Richarson played for the Houston Texans/Shreveport Steamer of the upstart World Football League in 1974, accumulating 98 carries for 334 yards and two touchdowns, 19 receptions for 158 yards, seven kickoff returns for 113 yards, and 14 punt returns for 84 yards.
