= The Renaissance House of Terrell Heights =

Non-profit organization in Texas

Coordinates: 32.73600001997145°N 97.31202190185006°W

The Renaissance House of Terrell Heights is a non-profit organization in Fort Worth, Texas dedicated to preserving the history and public memory of the historically Black neighborhood of Terrell Heights. The organization was founded by Dr. Jennifer Giddings Brooks and Marnese Barksdale Elder with the mission of supporting health and community history for residents of the 76104 ZIP Code.

== History ==
=== Terrell Heights ===
Located in Fort Worth's Historic Southside neighborhood, the community of Terrell Heights is the first historically Black middle-class neighborhood in the city. The community received a historic marker in 2019 that celebrated the impact of Terrell Heights-native, and the first Black millionaire in Texas, William "Gooseneck Bill" McDonald. The Renaissance House of Terrell Heights began serving the community in February 2024 after purchasing and remodeling the home of May Pearl Flint, the widow of William McDonald.

== Community work ==
=== Health ===
The Renaissance House has partnered with telemedicine providers to increase access to health care for Terrell Heights residents. This community work was inspired by the need to counteract the short life-expectancy in the 76104 ZIP code.

=== Cultural preservation ===
The creation of The Renaissance House contributes toward the revitalization efforts in Fort Worth's Historic Southside alongside the forthcoming National Juneteenth Museum. In 2025, the organization began conducting oral history interviews with current and former residents of Terrell Heights to document the histories of those who helped to shape the community.
