= North Texas Historic Transportation =

History of trolleys non-profit volunteering organization

North Texas Historic Transportation (NTHT) was an American non-profit volunteer organization focusing on the history of trolleys in the Fort Worth, Texas, area.

== See also ==
- Northern Texas Traction Company
