= Tanglewood, Fort Worth, Texas =

Neighborhood in Fort Worth, Texas

Tanglewood is a neighborhood in Fort Worth, Texas located slightly southwest of downtown. It is located near a branch of the Trinity River. The neighborhood has bicycle paths, parks, and is covered by tall trees.

Tanglewood is just west of Texas Christian University.

== History ==
The Tanglewood neighborhood consists of land in the low areas along the branch of the Trinity River and is approximately five miles southwest from the Fort Worth Central Business District.

The Tanglewood area lies within two surveys. The western part of the addition being part of the 1854 Felix G. Beasley Survey, and the eastern part, along the branch of the river, the 1876 James Howard Survey.

The original approach to the Tanglewood area consisted of a two-rut dirt road which is now Bellaire Drive South. Up to the time of development, children enjoyed swimming in the river in a deep hole which was located where the bridge is now on Bellaire Drive South near Trinity Commons Shopping Center.

The portions of Tanglewood which are now Bellaire Park Court, Marquette Court and Autumn Court were originally a dairy farm.

Land use restrictions filed on the Tanglewood addition stipulate that all houses must be brick or stone, and have at least a two-car garage attached to the house. Even though this was ranch property, it also stated that no cows, horses or other livestock would be allowed on the property after development.

== Neighborhood Description ==
The heritage of the ranchland shows in the typical architecture of Tanglewood, the predominant being ranch style. Most of the homes are single story with a few two stories here and there. However, the architecture of the homes has changed significantly in recent years, with many new homes being built much larger than the original ones. The streets wind around generally following the contours of the river and the trees tower over all. This is good bottom land and very fertile. In heavy rains the area flooded before measures were taken to control the Clear Fork and branches of the Trinity River which run through the area. The bicycle-walking trail which meanders through Tanglewood is well used and enjoyed because of the shade and park setting. It typifies the relaxed atmosphere of this executive neighborhood.

The bicycle trail was built originally by the City of Fort Worth in the early 1970s and expanded shortly thereafter with the leadership of Mrs. Margaret Rimmer - a prominent Fort Worth city council woman and resident of Tanglewood.

The Tanglewood neighborhood children primarily attend Tanglewood Elementary which has long been the highest ranking elementary school in Fort Worth ISD. Tanglewood Elementary is located right across the park from the neighborhood and allows many families in Tanglewood to walk and bike with their children to school.

== Schools ==
The neighborhood is zoned to schools in the Fort Worth Independent School District.

- Tanglewood Elementary School
- W.P. McLean Middle School
- R. L. Paschal High School

== See also ==
- List of neighborhoods in Fort Worth, Texas
