= Lake Shore Estates, Texas =

- Unincorporated community
- Location within Texas Location within the United States
- Coordinates: 32°37′51″N 97°29′05″W
- Country: United States
- State: Texas
- County: Tarrant
- Elevation: 722 ft (220 m)
- Time zone: UTC-6 (Central (CST))
  - Summer (DST): UTC-5 (CDT)
- GNIS feature ID: 1339513

Lake Shore Estates is an unincorporated community in Tarrant County, located in the U.S. state of Texas.
