= Ederville, Texas =

- Historical unincorporated community
- Location within Texas Location within the United States
- Coordinates: 32°45′26″N 97°12′39″W
- Country: United States
- State: Texas
- County: Tarrant
- Elevation: 630 ft (190 m)
- Time zone: UTC-6 (Central (CST))
  - Summer (DST): UTC-5 (CDT)
- GNIS feature ID: 1373586

Ederville was an unincorporated community in Tarrant County, located in the U.S. state of Texas. It is now within the city of Fort Worth.
