= Mallick Tower =

Office building in Fort Worth, Texas

Coordinates: 32°45′10″N 97°20′28″W

Mallick Tower is a multi-tenant office building located at 101 Summit Ave in Fort Worth, Texas. Built in 1968, Mallick Tower was the first highrise in downtown Fort Worth west of Henderson Street. The building is located on a 1.8 acres (0.73 ha) lot, is 10 stories high, contains 90,000 square feet (8,400 m^{2}) of office space, and stands at a height of 112 feet (34 m).

== History and Opening ==
The tower was conceived and built by George A. Mallick, Jr. (b.1934 – d. 1999), a successful Fort Worth real estate developer. The lavish opening party that year included the arrival of Congressman Jim Wright to the party by helicopter. The relationship between the two men would later be investigated in the Federal ethics review of Congressman Wright over money given to him by Mr. Mallick. The investigation began in 1988 and concluded with the resignation of the then Speaker of the House of Representatives in 1989. Mr. Mallick continued to develop other large multi-tenant residential and commercial projects around the Fort Worth area prior to his death in 1999. He is buried in Greenwood Memorial Park and Mausoleum in Fort Worth, TX.

== 2000 Tornado ==
The building was one of the downtown high-rises that bore the brunt of the 2000 tornado which destroyed much of downtown Ft Worth. The building sustained near complete damage of the south and west facing sides of the building and sustained a large amount of internal water and wind damage. The building was rebuilt and renovated the following year as well as in 2009. In 2013, Mallick Tower was recognized as a City of Fort Worth Smartwater Award winner for changes that allowed savings of over 250,000 US gallons (950,000 L; 210,000 imp gal) of water per year.

== Heliport ==
Mallick Tower Heliport (TX77) is a rooftop heliport located on Mallick Tower positioned at an elevation of 695 feet (212 m).
