= Eastchase, Fort Worth, Texas =

Neighborhood in Fort Worth, Texas

Eastchase is a neighborhood of the city of Fort Worth, Texas. It is located south of Interstate 30 and bordered on the east and south by the city of Arlington.

== Demographics ==
The neighborhood has a population of 5,083 people, and a population density of 2,521 people per square mile, less than the Fort Worth average of 2,715.
