= Temple Christian School (Titusville, Florida) =

Location
- 1400 North US Route 1 Titusville, Florida 32796; United States
- Coordinates: 28°38′04″N 80°49′42″W

Information
- Type: Private school
- Established: 1994
- Founder: Wendell Correll
- Principal: Andrea Stoner
- Teaching staff: 24.0 (on an FTE basis)
- Grades: K-12
- Enrollment: 300 (2021-22)
- Student to teacher ratio: 8.2
- Colors: White and blue
- Nickname: Lions
- Rival: Merritt Island Christian
- Website: templelions.com

Temple Christian School is a private Christian school in Titusville, Florida.

== History ==
Temple was founded in 1994 by Wendell Correll, pastor of Temple Baptist Church.
