= Sansom Park, Texas =

- City
- Location of Sansom Park in Tarrant County, Texas
- Coordinates: 32°48′14″N 97°24′10″W
- Country: United States
- State: Texas
- County: Tarrant

Area
  - Total: 1.24 sq mi (3.21 km^{2})
  - Land: 1.24 sq mi (3.21 km^{2})
  - Water: 0 sq mi (0.00 km^{2})
- Elevation: 751 ft (229 m)

Population (2020)
  - Total: 5,454
  - Density: 4,400/sq mi (1,700/km^{2})
- Time zone: UTC-6 (CST)
  - Summer (DST): UTC-5 (CDT)
- ZIP code: 76114
- Area code: 817
- FIPS code: 48-65660
- GNIS feature ID: 2411813
- Website: http://www.sansompark.org/

Sansom Park is a city in Tarrant County, Texas, United States. Its population was 5,454 at the 2020 census.

== Geography ==
According to the United States Census Bureau, the city has a total area of 1.2 mi^{2} (3.1 km^{2}), all land.

== Demographics ==
Historical population
Census	Pop.	Note	%±
1950	1,611		—
1960	4,175		159.2%
1970	4,771		14.3%
1980	3,921		−17.8%
1990	3,928		0.2%
2000	4,181		6.4%
2010	4,686		12.1%
2020	5,454		16.4%
U.S. Decennial Census

=== 2020 census ===
As of the 2020 census, Sansom Park had a population of 5,454 and 1,000 families. The median age was 33.8 years. 28.3% of residents were under the age of 18 and 12.2% of residents were 65 years of age or older. For every 100 females there were 98.4 males, and for every 100 females age 18 and over there were 92.7 males age 18 and over.

100.0% of residents lived in urban areas, while 0.0% lived in rural areas.

There were 1,752 households in Sansom Park, of which 42.6% had children under the age of 18 living in them. Of all households, 42.1% were married-couple households, 19.5% were households with a male householder and no spouse or partner present, and 30.6% were households with a female householder and no spouse or partner present. About 24.8% of all households were made up of individuals and 11.5% had someone living alone who was 65 years of age or older.

There were 1,880 housing units, of which 6.8% were vacant. The homeowner vacancy rate was 0.6% and the rental vacancy rate was 7.3%.

Racial composition as of the 2020 census
Race	Number	Percent
White	2,388	43.8%
Black or African American	235	4.3%
American Indian and Alaska Native	95	1.7%
Asian	39	0.7%
Native Hawaiian and Other Pacific Islander	2	0.0%
Some other race	1,525	28.0%
Two or more races	1,170	21.5%
Hispanic or Latino (of any race)	3,461	63.5%

== Education ==
Most of Sansom Park is served by the Castleberry Independent School District. A small portion of the city is served by the Lake Worth Independent School District.
