= Woodhaven, Fort Worth, Texas =

Neighborhood in Fort Worth, Texas

Coordinates: 32.772°N 97.229°W

Woodhaven is a neighborhood at the corner of Interstate 30 and the Loop 820 East interchange in Fort Worth, Texas, United States. The neighborhood is bounded by the Trinity River to the north and the former CBS Channel 11 KTVT studios to the south. The Woodhaven Country Club, which has a clubhouse, a 6,543-yard, par 71, 18-hole golf course, a swimming pool, and tennis courts, is the center of the community.

== History ==
In 1969 a group of investors, including Governor of Texas John Connally, bought a tract of the Boaz Ranch Estate and announced on April 14, 1969, that it intended to develop the area into a community. Development of the residences began in the 1970s. The country club opened on July 3, 1973. Terry Dill, a professional golfer, helped design the golf course. In 1998 the residents founded Woodhaven Community Development, Inc.

== Education ==
=== Primary and secondary schools ===
Residents are zoned to schools in the Fort Worth Independent School District. Some areas are zoned to Eastern Hills Elementary School and other areas are zoned to Lowery Road Elementary School. All residents are zoned to Meadowbrook Middle School and Eastern Hills High School.

Catholic schools are operated by the Diocese of Fort Worth. Area Catholic schools in Fort Worth include St. Rita Catholic School (PreK3-8), Nolan Catholic High School, and St. Ignatius of Loyola College Preparatory School. Area Catholic Schools in Arlington include Saint Maria Goretti Catholic School (PreK-8).

Other nearby private schools in Fort Worth include Center For Creative Living School (K-8), Oakridge School (K-12), Temple Christian School (K-12), East Fort Worth Montessori Academy (PreK-5), Al-Hedayah Academy (PreK-9 with 12th grade in 2012) Key School (1-12 and Age 4-Adult), Temple Christian Schools (K-12), and Fellowship Christian Academy (formerly Meadowbrook Legacy Christian Academy and Meadowbrook Christian School (K-12).

Nearby private schools in Arlington include The Oakridge School (Early childhood-12), Gateway School, and Country Day School of Arlington (Age 2-K)

Nearby private schools in Arlington and Pantego include the Arlington Campus of Pantego Christian Academy.

A charter school near by, is ILTexas Woodhaven.

=== Colleges and universities ===
Area colleges and universities include Remington College, Texas Wesleyan University, and University of Texas at Arlington Fort Worth Campus (UTA).

=== Public libraries ===
Fort Worth Library operates the Fort Worth East Regional Library. The facility opened on October 25, 1996.
