= Historic Carver Heights, Fort Worth, Texas =

Coordinates: 32°43′31″N 97°13′43″W

Historic Carver Heights is a neighborhood in south-east Fort Worth.

Carver Heights was specifically developed as a neighborhood of high quality houses for Black professionals, meant to appeal to the growing demographic of the Black middle class. The neighborhood was named after George Washington Carver, and construction began shortly after 1950. The developer imposed protective deed restrictions that limited the type and quantity of commercial activity in the neighborhood.

Many residents who moved into the neighborhood in the 1950's and 1960's achieved "firsts" as they pushed past the restrictions of Jim Crow and acquired positions previously denied to them due to segregation.

Carver Heights neighborhood was zoned as an historic district by the city of Fort Worth in 2006. The boundaries of the neighborhood are Stalcup Rd. on the west, E. Rosedale Ave. on the north, S. Cravens Rd. on the east, and Ramey Ave. on the south.

In 2017, a sculpture, titled The Ancestors, was installed in Historic Carver Heights. It commemorates the significance of the neighborhood and its early residents in local Black history.

== Notable residents ==
- Reby Cary (educator, politician, historian)
- L. Clifford Davis (attorney, judge)
