= Lake Worth Independent School District =

School district in Texas

Coordinates: 32.8120°N 97.4393°W

Location
- Lake Worth, Texas Region 11 USA

District information
- Type: Public
- Grades: Pre-K through 12
- Superintendent: Ena Meyers
- NCES District ID: 4826490

Students and staff
- Students: 3,249 (2024-25)
- Teachers: 213.92 (on an FTE basis) (2024-25)
- Staff: 345.15 (on an FTE basis) (2024-25)
- Colors: Green and white

Other information
- Mascot: Bullfrog
- Website: www.lwisd.org

Lake Worth Independent School District is a public school district based in Lake Worth, Texas, United States.

In addition to Lake Worth, the district serves small portions of Fort Worth and Sansom Park.

In 2009, the school district was rated "academically acceptable" by the Texas Education Agency.

== Schools ==
Lake Worth ISD has five schools - two in Lake Worth and three in Fort Worth.

- Lake Worth High School (Lake Worth; grades 9-12)
- Lucyle Collins Middle (Fort Worth; grades 6-8)
- Effie Morris STEAM Academy (Lake Worth; prekindergarten-5)
- Marilyn Janice Miller Language Academy (Fort Worth; grades prekindergarten-5)
- Marine Creek Leadership Academy (Fort Worth; grades prekindergarten-5)

== History ==
=== Rosen Heights Independent School District (1916-1959) ===
On May 6, 1916, local citizens voted 16-1 to incorporate Rosen Heights Independent School District (ISD). Rosen Heights Independent School was founded in 1923 with 16 pupils in a vacant store donated by a Mr. Hodgkins. In 1936, the district acquired land in Lake Worth to build a school building. The first reference to the building as Lake Worth School was on May 8, 1940. After a fire burned down the original school building, in the fall of 1943, school began in a yet-unfinished new school building.

In 1940, the City of Fort Worth, the Civil Aeronautics Administration, and Consolidated Aircraft began plans to build an airfield and aircraft assembly plant in the Lake Worth vicinity. The next year, the board of trustees asked the Texas State Legislature for assistance in providing additional room and equipment for the anticipated growth the airfield would bring.

The Rosen Heights ISD school board resisted an effort by the City of Fort Worth to annex the school district in 1946.

Starting in February 1948, several attempts were made to pass a municipal bond election for $50,000 to build new classrooms, including a 170-183 loss in August 1949. The bond eventually passed in August 1950; at the time, Rosen Heights' total taxable value was $2,731,164.

During 1948-1950, the school board and superintendent sent letters to Carswell Air Force Base, congressmen, and the War Department, requesting that the base reroute their flight plans so as to not fly over the Lake Worth school building. In November 1954, an attorney was named to address the issue of the planes flying over the school.

During the 1950s, the district made plans for a new high school building and two elementary school buildings. On June 29, 1959, a school board decision changed the legal name of the school district from Rosen Heights SD to Lake Worth ISD, effective September 1 of that year.

=== Lake Worth ISD (1959-today) ===
By the 1960s, noise from air traffic at Carswell Air Force Base caused the district's schools to lose 10% of teaching time each day. To mitigate this problem, Lake Worth Junior High School was built underground; this 1964 construction project included 18 rooms at a cost of $495,000.

In August 1970, voting for school board members was changed from at-large to election by place. Each year, two or three of the seven board member positions are up for election.

In December 2025, the Texas Education Agency announced that it would assume governance of the district after multiple consecutive years of failing accountability ratings at Marilyn Miller Language Academy and other campuses. State law required the TEA to either order closure of the campus or appoint a board of managers to govern the school district. Marilyn Miller had not received an acceptable rating in eight years, and five of the district’s six campuses were rated academically unacceptable. Commissioner Mike Morath stated he would appoint a conservator and a board of managers drawn from the local community, citing a chronic inability to support student achievement and noting that only 22 percent of students were meeting grade level. The TEA replaced the elected board of trustees with a board of managers in April 2026.

== Students ==
=== Academics ===
STAAR - Percent at Level II Satisfactory Standard or Above (Sum of All Grades Tested)
Subject	Lake Worth ISD	Region 11	State of Texas
Reading	66%	76%	73%
Mathematics	68%	78%	76%
Writing	51%	72%	69%
Science	67%	81%	79%
Soc. Studies	61%	80%	77%
All Tests	65%	77%	75%

Local region and statewide averages on standardized tests typically exceed the average scores of students in Lake Worth. In the 2015-2016 State of Texas Assessments of Academic Readiness results, 65% of students in Lake Worth ISD met Level II satisfactory standards, compared with 77% in Region 11 and 75% in the rest of the state. The average SAT score of the class of 2015 was 1293, and the average ACT score was 17.1.

=== Demographics ===
In the 2015-2016 school year, the school district had a total of 3,296 students, ranging from early childhood education and prekindergarten through grade 12. The class of 2015 included 155 graduates; the annual drop-out rate across grades 9-12 was less than 0.5%.

As of the 2015-2016 school year, the ethnic distribution of the school district was 58.5% Hispanic, 24.2% White, 12.4% African American, 1.1% Asian, 0.5% American Indian, 0.2% Pacific Islander, and 3.0% from two or more races. Economically disadvantaged students made up 79.5% of the student body.
