= Garden Acres, Texas =

- Historical unincorporated community
- Location within Texas Location within the United States
- Coordinates: 32°35′40″N 97°18′09″W
- Country: United States
- State: Texas
- County: Tarrant
- Elevation: 679 ft (207 m)
- Time zone: UTC-6 (Central (CST))
  - Summer (DST): UTC-5 (CDT)
- GNIS feature ID: 1336386

Garden Acres was an unincorporated community in Tarrant County, located in the U.S. state of Texas. The area is now largely within the city of Fort Worth, located between Rendon and Everman to the south of the city.
