= Northern Texas Traction Company =

Streetcar system operator, subsidiary of Stine& Webster

Texas Interurban Railway
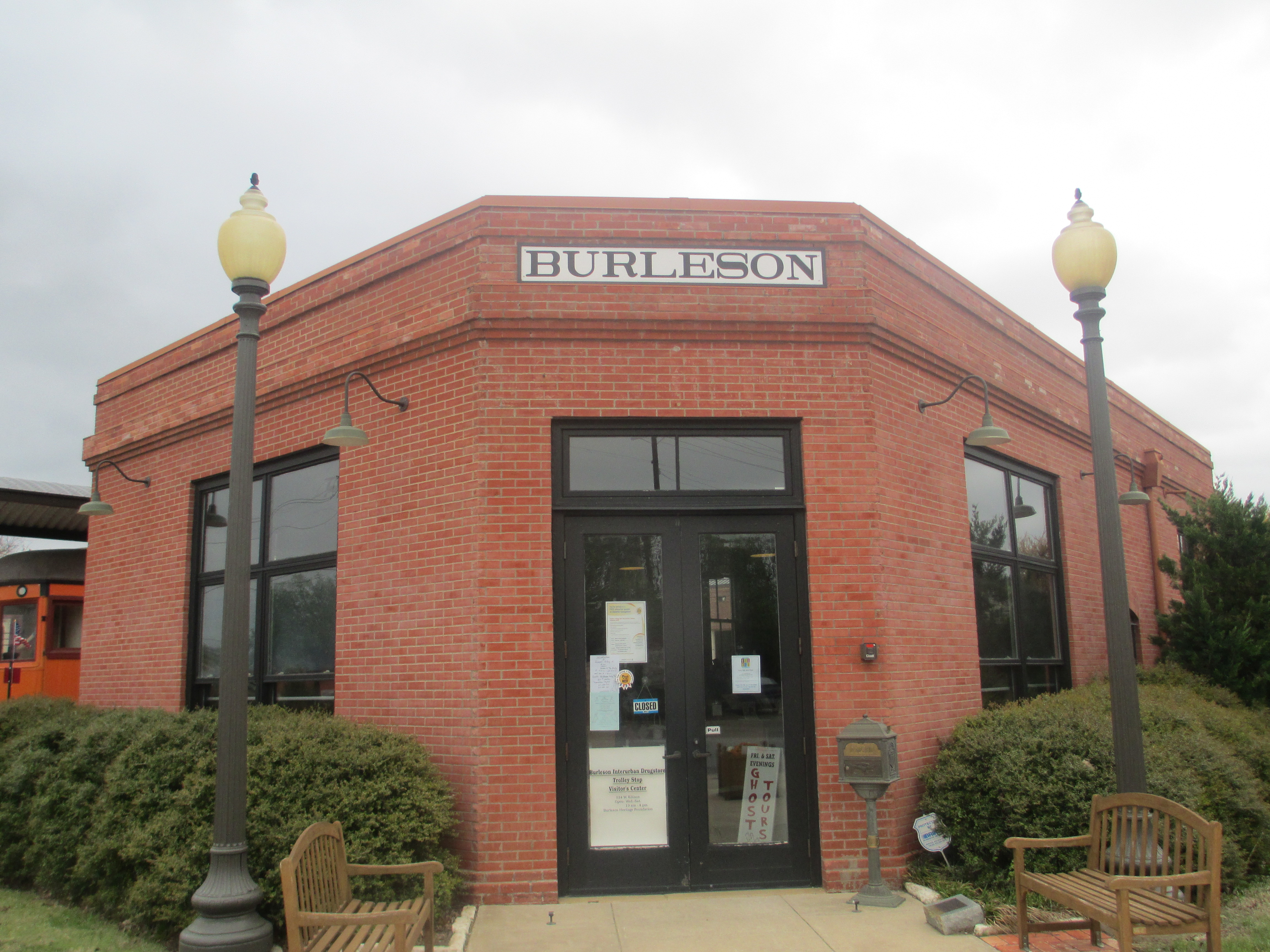
- A restored former Northern Texas Traction Company station in Burleson, Texas

Overview
- Status: Defunct
- Locale: Fort Worth—Dallas, Texas

Service
- Type: Interurban, streetcar

History
- Opened: 1902
- Closed: 1937

Technical
- Track gauge: 4 ft 8 1/2 in (1,435 mm) standard gauge
- Electrification: Trolley wire

The Northern Texas Traction Company was a subsidiary of Stone & Webster that operated the streetcar system and interurban lines in Fort Worth, Texas.

The Northern Texas Traction Company began with the purchase of the City Railway of Fort Worth by George T. Bishop in 1900. Bishop also acquired the Dallas and Oak Cliff Elevated Railway to gain access to Dallas. Construction of the second interurban line in the state of Texas linked the cities of Fort Worth and Dallas with operations commencing on July 1, 1902. The Bishop interests sold out to Stone & Webster Engineering in 1905. The company produced a monthly employee newsletter called The Traction News throughout the 1920s.

The power generating plant and workshops for the interurban line were located in the small town of Handley just east of Fort Worth. The Northern Texas Traction Company bought land south of Handley where it developed a trolley park called Lake Erie. The pavilion at Lake Erie included a roller skating rink, a dance hall, restaurant, and rides on a pier above the water.

Northern Texas Traction actively fought the loss of passenger traffic to the private automobile. Its efforts to maintain ridership led the company to receive the Charles A. Coffin medal in 1927. Numerous ideas to improve service and improve profits were implemented including the Birney Safety Car and Crimson Limited Interurban deluxe service.

NTT was one of the first three traction cities to obtain Birney Safety Cars, the first city to fully equip a line with Birney Cars and a member of the Electric Railway Presidents' Conference Committee, which produced the PCC streetcar (although PCCs did not see service in Fort Worth until the advent of the Tandy Center Subway).

Stone & Webster sold the company in 1934 as the result of diminishing profits and antitrust action brought by the federal government. The last interurban run was completed on Christmas eve, 1934, and streetcar service was maintained by the transit company until 1937 when the city charter was renewed and revised.

== See also ==
- North Texas Historic Transportation
