= Castleberry High School =

Location
- River Oaks, Texas; United States; 32.7620°N 97.3925°W

Information
- School type: Public high school
- School district: Castleberry Independent School District
- Principal: Ruben Molinar
- Staff: 101.4 (FTE)
- Faculty: 70.6
- Grades: 9-12
- Enrollment: 1,085 (2024-2025)
- Student to teacher ratio: 15.4
- Colors: Red and Columbia blue
- Athletics conference: UIL Class 4A
- Mascot: Lions
- Website: Castleberry High School

Castleberry High School is a public high school in River Oaks, Texas, United States. It administers grades 9–12 and is part of the Castleberry Independent School District. It serves predominantly minority students. Most students come from the Castleberry Independent School District's middle school, Irma Marsh Middle School.

== Overview ==
Castleberry High School remains in an upwards trend in academic performance according to the state's public education agency, Texas Education Agency, but fails to adequately prepare students for postsecondary success when compared to local high schools and statewide. The latest published Texas School Report Card gave a score of B, 83 out of 100, for recognized performance in encouraging appropriate academic growth for most students. This is recognizing 90.3% of the student enrolled are economically disadvantaged, 38.2% English language learners, 15.4% of students are receiving special education services. Student enrollment by race/ethnicity is mostly composed of minority students - 84.8% of students are Hispanic/Latinos and 89.6% of the total student population is a minority.

=== Notable events ===
On April 27, 2018, a school police officer was under investigation after a video showed the officer shoved a student into a wall.

A viral video recorded on November 19, 2021, showed a student slapping a teacher and gained national attention.

== Student body ==
During the 2024-2025 school year, Castleberry High School enrolled 1,085 total students in Grade 9 (26.0%), Grade 10 (27.0%), Grade 11 (24.7%), and Grade 12 (22.3%). Ethnicities represented include Hispanic (84.8%), White (10.2%), African American (3.0%), Two or More Races (1.5%), American Indian (0.3%), and Asian and Pacific Islander (0.0%). The sex distribution was Female (47.2%) and Male (52.8%). 90.3 percent were economically disadvantaged.

There were 225 graduates in the class of 2024. The annual dropout rate is 0.2% (in 2023-24).

== Academic performance and college, career, and military readiness ==
Among Castleberry's class of 2014, the average SAT score was 1282, and the average ACT score was 17.6. Across all grades at the school, the STAAR Percent at Phase-in Satisfactory Standard or Above for 2014-15 was 65% for reading, 76% for mathematics, 88% for science, and 89% for social studies.

According to the TEA's Accountability Data, only 62% of graduating students for 2018-2019 school year met at least one criterion to be ready for college, career, or the military. As by the TEA, "There are several ways a student can demonstrate college, career, or military readiness. These include earning minimum scores on national college entrance exams, completing college-level classes in high school, or earning a qualifying industry credential. This measure illustrates the percentage of students who have met one of these criteria to demonstrate they are ready for one of those paths."

=== Rates by criteria for college, career, and military readiness for CHS ===
- Scored at or above the college-ready level on ACT, SAT, Texas Success Initiative Assessment, or earned credit for a college-prep course: 26%.
- Scored high enough to earn college credit on AP Exam/International Baccalaureate exams: 7%.
- Completed a college-level dual credit course: 27%.
- Earned an industry-based certification: 7%.
- Earned an associate's degree: 0%.
- Graduated with the completed individual education program and workforce readiness: 2%.
- Enlisted in the armed forces: 3%.
- Completed an onramps dual enrollment course and received college credit: 0%.
- Student identified as receiving special education services and earned an advanced degree plan: 2%.
- Earned a level I or level II certificate: 0%.
- Completed coherent sequence of career & technical education coursework aligned to industry certification: 21%.

== School progress for 2018-2019 school year ==
Texas Education Agency gave Castleberry High School a B, 85 out of 100, in the question of "How much better did the students perform at this school?" School Progress measures how much better students performed on the STAAR test this year versus last year. It also looks at how much better students are doing academically at the school compared to similar schools. High schools, Castleberry High School as an example, earned a B (80–89) for recognized progress in 70% or more of students making a year's worth of academic gains OR the district's achievement is above average compared to similar districts.

Calculating the score comes in the hand of two components, "Academic Growth" and "Relative Performance." Academic Growth measures how many students gained a year in reading and math skills over the course of the school year. A full or half-point is given for each student who grew academically, depending upon how much growth occurred. The resulting point total is generally equivalent to the percentage of students who gained a full year of academic skills, and the point total is converted to a final score. In this way, growth is rewarded, even if students start significantly below grade level.

Castleberry High School scored an 80 out of 100. Students who grew a year academically was at 70%, compared to the district's average of 66%. Relative performance is determined by looking at a school's performance in the Student Achievement domain relative to the percentage of economically disadvantaged students at the school. Using data from 2016–17, every school in Texas was plotted with its Student Achievement vs its students' poverty, to establish a baseline for this comparison. Schools with Student Achievement above the achievement at schools with similar levels of student poverty receive higher scores. Castleberry High School scored an 85 out of 100. Student Performance and CMM Readiness was noted at 55% and economically disadvantaged students at 77.1% (range: 77.1 to 78).

== Notable alumni ==
- Mike Richardson – former running back with the Houston Oilers of the National Football League
- Ernest Istook – former member of the U.S. House of Representatives
