= Bisbee, Texas =

- Historical unincorporated community
- Location within Texas Location within the United States
- Coordinates: 32°36′32″N 97°11′03″W
- Country: United States
- State: Texas
- County: Tarrant
- Elevation: 702 ft (214 m)
- Time zone: UTC-6 (Central (CST))
  - Summer (DST): UTC-5 (CDT)
- GNIS feature ID: 1378010

Bisbee was an unincorporated community in Tarrant County, located in the U.S. state of Texas. It is now largely part of the cities of Arlington and Mansfield.
