= Arlington Municipal Airport (Texas) =

Public airport in Arlington, Texas, US

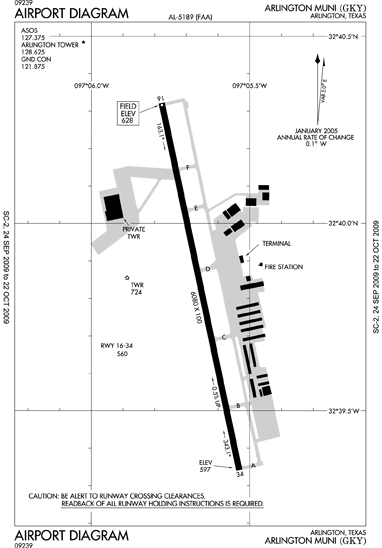
- IATA: none; ICAO: KGKY; FAA LID: GKY

Summary
- Airport type: Public
- Operator: City of Arlington
- Serves: Arlington, Texas
- Elevation AMSL: 628 ft (191 m)
- Coordinates: 32°39′50″N 097°05′39″W
- Website: www.arlingtontx.gov/city_hall/departments/arlington_municipal_airport

Map
- Location within Texas Location within the United States

Runways
Direction	Length		Surface
Direction	ft	m	Surface
16/34	6,080	1,853	Concrete

Statistics (2015)
- Aircraft operations: 88,222
- Based aircraft: 200
- Source: Federal Aviation Administration

Arlington Municipal Airport (ICAO: KGKY, FAA LID: GKY) is five miles south of Arlington, in Tarrant County, Texas. The airport is at the intersection of Interstate 20 and South Collins Road; it is a reliever airport for Dallas/Fort Worth International Airport and Dallas Love Field.

Several companies operate aircraft services on the airport property, including the Bell Helicopter division of Textron.

Most U.S. airports use the same three-letter location identifier for the FAA and IATA, but this airport is GKY to the FAA and has no IATA code.

== History ==
In August 2025, E-Space announced plans to build a headquarters at the airport. Ground for the 480,000-square-foot (45,000 m^{2}) facility was broken that October.

== Facilities ==
The airport covers 500 acres (200 ha) at an elevation of 628 feet (191 m). Its single runway, 16/34, is 6,080 by 100 feet (1,853 x 30 m) concrete.

In the year ending December 31, 2015 the airport had 88,222 aircraft operations, average 242 per day: 98% general aviation, 1% air taxi, <1% airline, and <1% military. 200 aircraft were then based at this airport: 163 single-engine, 14 multi-engine, 14 jet, 8 helicopter and 1 glider.

== See also ==
- List of airports in Texas
