= Southwest Christian School (Fort Worth, Texas) =

Location
- 6901 Altamesa Blvd; Fort Worth, Tarrant County, Texas 76123; United States; 32°38′31″N 97°26′41″W

Information
- Type: Private Christian
- Established: 1969
- Teaching staff: 81.9 (FTE) (2019–20)
- Grades: PreK–12
- Gender: Co-ed
- Enrollment: 782 (2019–20)
- Student to teacher ratio: 8.6 (2019–20)
- Mascot: Zeke the Eagle
- Accreditation: AdvancED/Southern Association of Colleges and Schools on Accreditation and School Improvement
- Newspaper: Eagle Editorial
- Affiliation: Christian
- Website: www.southwestchristian.org

Southwest Christian School is a private, coeducational, college-preparatory Christian school in Fort Worth, Texas, United States. It has both a lower campus and an upper campus, approximately 2 miles away from each other.

== Notable alumni ==
- Austen Williams, professional baseball pitcher
