= National Juneteenth Museum =

The National Juneteenth Museum is a planned museum in Fort Worth in Texas. Designs for the museum were unveiled in June 2022. The museum will be designed by KAI Enterprises and the design studio BIG. The museum commemorates Juneteenth, the emancipation of enslaved African Americans, marked by a federal holiday in the United States on 19 June. Fort Worth activist Opal Lee, also known as "the Grandmother of Juneteenth", is set to lead the museum initiative.

The museum is planned for the Historic Southside district of Fort Worth in Texas. Construction on the museum was due to start in 2023, but as of June 2025, it had not broken ground.
