= Castleberry Independent School District =

Public school district in Texas, United States

Address
- 5228 Ohio Garden Road River Oaks, Texas Region 11 United States

District information
- Type: Public
- Motto: Inspire, Empower, Innovate
- Grades: Pre-K through 12
- Established: 1945
- Superintendent: Renee Smith-Faulkner
- Governing agency: Texas Education Agency
- NCES District ID: 4813170

Students and staff
- Students: 3,780
- Teachers: 247.5
- Staff: 516
- Colors: Scarlet Red and Columbia/Light Blue

Other information
- Mascot: Lion
- Website: castleberryisd.net

Castleberry Independent School District is a public school district located in River Oaks, Texas, United States. The district's boundaries contain River Oaks, the city of Sansom Park, and Fort Worth. The district covers an area around 5.438 sq mi, placing it among the smallest (in geographic size) public school districts in Texas.

Castleberry ISD is located five miles west of downtown Fort Worth, in a densely populated community covering an area of approximately 5.438 sq mi,. The district includes the City of River Oaks (pop. 7,646), a large portion of Sansom Park (pop. 5,454), and a small portion of the City of Fort Worth.* Castleberry ISD is bound on the west and the south by the Trinity River, on the east by Fort Worth, and the north by Lake Worth.

In 2009, the school district was rated "academically acceptable" by the Texas Education Agency.

== Schools ==
=== High school ===
- Castleberry High School – grades 9–12 – also referred to as CHS

=== Middle school ===
- Irma Marsh Middle School – grades 6–9 – also referred to as Irma Marsh or IMMS

=== Elementary schools ===
- A.V. Cato Elementary School – grades Pre-Kindergarten–5 – also referred to as A.V. Cato or AVC
- Castleberry Elementary School – grades Pre-Kindergarten–5 – also referred to as CE
- Joy James Academy of Leadership – grades Pre-Kindergarten–5 – also referred to as Joy James or JJA, and formerly known as Joy James Elementary

=== Alternative schools ===
- REACH High School (grades 9–12)
- TRUCE Learning Center (grades 6–12)

== Students ==
=== Academics ===
STAAR - Percent at Level II Satisfactory Standard or Above (Sum of All Grades Tested)
Subject	Castleberry ISD	Region 11	State of Texas
Reading	66%	76%	73%
Mathematics	70%	78%	76%
Writing	66%	72%	69%
Science	71%	81%	79%
Soc. Studies	76%	80%	77%
All Tests	69%	77%	75%

Local region and statewide averages on standardized tests typically exceed the average scores of students in Castleberry. In 2015-2016 State of Texas Assessments of Academic Readiness (STAAR) results, 69% of students in Castleberry ISD met Level II Satisfactory standards, compared with 77% in Region 11 and 75% in the state. The average SAT score of the class of 2015 was 1300, and the average ACT score was 19.0.

=== Demographics ===
In the 2015–2016 school year, the school district had a total of 4,044 students, ranging from early childhood education and prekindergarten through grade 12. The class of 2015 included 188 graduates; the annual drop-out rate across grades 9-12 was 1.8%.

As of the 2015–2016 school year, the ethnic distribution of the school district was 76.7% Hispanic, 20.4% White, 1.1% African American, 0.3% American Indian, 0.2% Asian, and 1.1% from two or more races. Economically disadvantaged students made up 84.0% of the student body.
