= Handley, Fort Worth, Texas =

Coordinates: 32°44′N 97°13′W

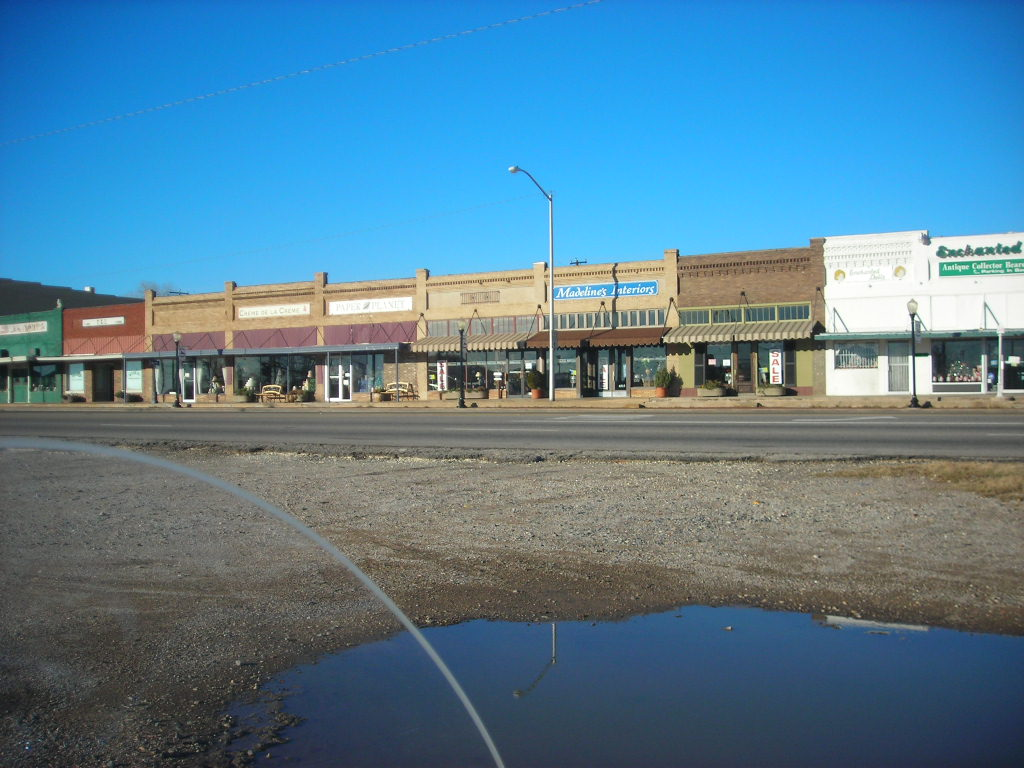
A line of businesses in what once was the downtown area of Handley, Tx

Handley was a town in Tarrant County, Texas, United States. It is located between downtown Fort Worth and Arlington along State Highway 180, and includes the Central Handley Historic District. It is now a part of Fort Worth.

== History ==
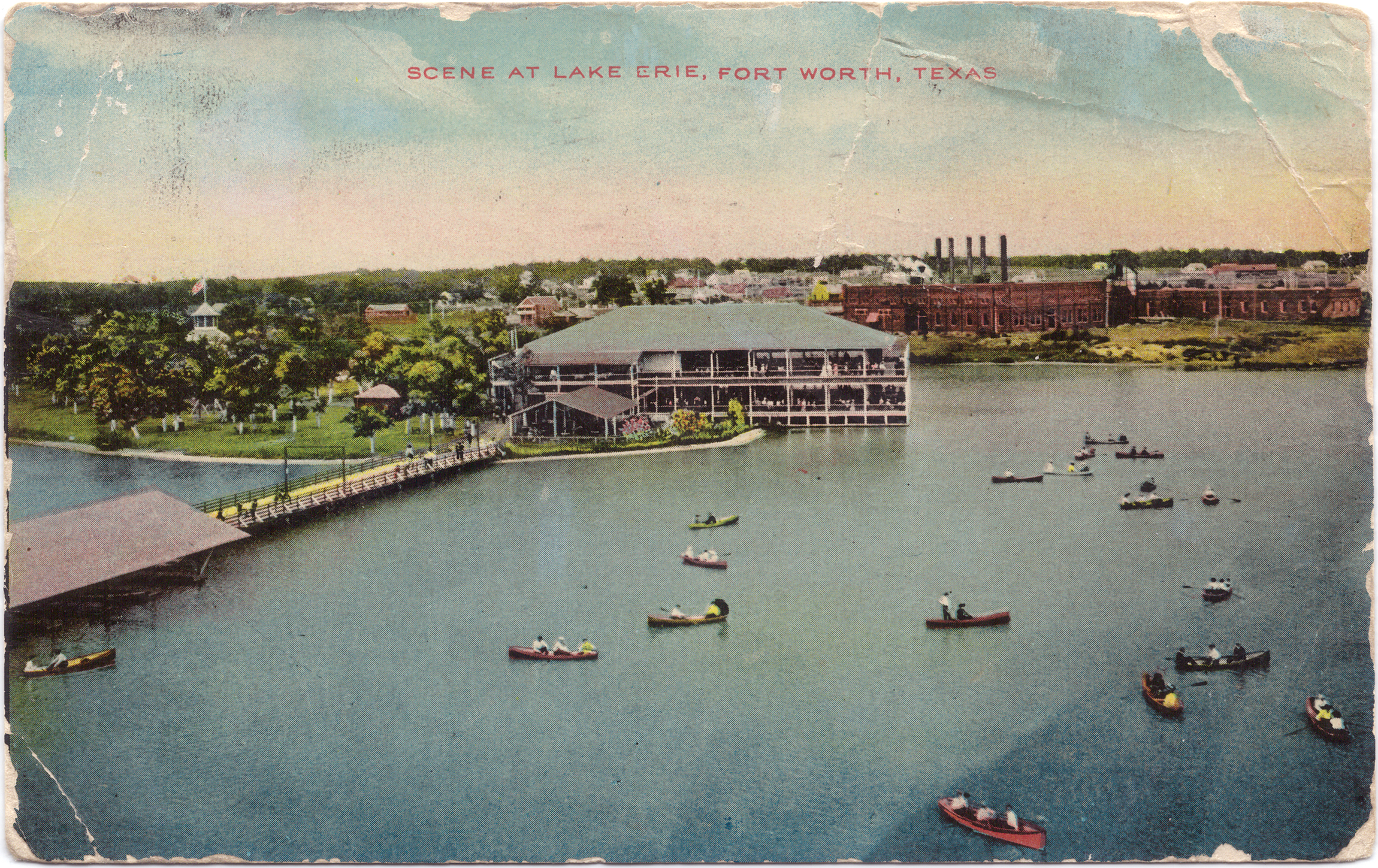
Postcard of Lake Erie, 1910

Handley was established in 1885 by the Texas & Pacific Railroad and named after retired Confederate Major James Madison Handley of Georgia. Handley created a plantation just seven miles from the center of Fort Worth on land that was adjacent to the Sara Gray Jennings Survey of 1847, and a very small community began to grow around him to the west. According to the Fort Worth Gazette newspaper of 1888, the most that could be said for the area was that it was good for hunting foxes. By 1901, Handley had 12 houses and 80 residents.

=== Interurban ===
In 1902, the Northern Texas Traction Company linked the city of Dallas to the east and the city of Fort Worth to the west with its own electric interurban streetcar line.

=== Annexed by Fort Worth ===
In 1946, the city of Fort Worth annexed Handley as a community and its independence came to an end. In that year, it had 510 school students and a total population of around 2500. Fort Worth had a population of well over 100,000 residents.
