= Lake Worth, Texas =

- City
- City of Lake Worth
- Location of Lake Worth in Tarrant County, Texas
- Coordinates: 32°48′47″N 97°25′50″W
- Country: United States
- State: Texas
- County: Tarrant

Government
  - Type: Council-Manager

Area
  - Total: 2.46 sq mi (6.38 km^{2})
  - Land: 2.46 sq mi (6.38 km^{2})
  - Water: 0 sq mi (0.00 km^{2})
- Elevation: 709 ft (216 m)

Population (2020)
  - Total: 4,711
  - Density: 1,910/sq mi (738/km^{2})
- Time zone: UTC-6 (CST)
  - Summer (DST): UTC-5 (CDT)
- ZIP codes: 76135-76136
- Area code: 817
- FIPS code: 48-41056
- GNIS feature ID: 2411608
- Website: http://www.lakeworthtx.org/

Lake Worth is a city in Tarrant County, Texas, United States. Its population was 4,711 at the 2020 census. The city is adjacent to and named after Lake Worth, a popular recreational lake in the northwestern portion of Tarrant County.

== Geography ==
According to the United States Census Bureau, the city has a total area of 2.5 square miles (6.5 km^{2}), all land.

== Demographics ==
Historical population
Census	Pop.	Note	%±
1950	2,351		—
1960	3,833		63.0%
1970	4,958		29.4%
1980	4,394		−11.4%
1990	4,591		4.5%
2000	4,618		0.6%
2010	4,584		−0.7%
2020	4,711		2.8%
U.S. Decennial Census

=== 2020 census ===
As of the 2020 census, 4,711 people, 1,723 households, and 1,162 families lived in Lake Worth. The median age was 40.0 years. 22.6% of residents were under the age of 18 and 17.3% of residents were 65 years of age or older. For every 100 females there were 98.0 males, and for every 100 females age 18 and over there were 99.3 males age 18 and over.

Of the 1,723 households, 33.2% had children under the age of 18 living in them. Of all households, 47.2% were married-couple households, 19.7% were households with a male householder and no spouse or partner present, and 26.5% were households with a female householder and no spouse or partner present. About 22.3% of all households were made up of individuals and 10.3% had someone living alone who was 65 years of age or older.

There were 1,814 housing units, of which 5.0% were vacant. The homeowner vacancy rate was 1.2% and the rental vacancy rate was 6.3%.

100.0% of residents lived in urban areas, while 0.0% lived in rural areas.

Racial composition as of the 2020 census
Race	Number	Percent
White	3,167	67.2%
Black or African American	72	1.5%
American Indian and Alaska Native	63	1.3%
Asian	44	0.9%
Native Hawaiian and Other Pacific Islander	13	0.3%
Some other race	688	14.6%
Two or more races	664	14.1%
Hispanic or Latino (of any race)	1,722	36.6%

== Education ==
The city of Lake Worth is served by the Lake Worth Independent School District.
