= Temple Christian School (Fort Worth, Texas) =

Temple Christian Schools

Location
- 6824 Randol Mill Rd; Fort Worth, Texas 76120; United States; 32.778546°N 97.208590°W

Information
- Type: Private school
- Established: 1972
- Principal: Shelena Schweitzer (elementary) and Ladye Welpman (secondary)
- Faculty: 35
- Grades: PreK-12
- Enrollment: 315 (2013-2014)
- Color
- Team name: Eagles
- Website: Official Website

Temple Christian School is a private Christian school in Fort Worth, Texas, founded in 1972. It serves students from pre-K to 12th grade at its 29-acre campus on 6824 Randol Mill Road in northeast Fort Worth. Temple is a coeducational institution serving students with college prep and general programs.
