= River Oaks, Texas =

City in Texas, United States, population 7,427

- City
- City of River Oaks
- Location of River Oaks in Tarrant County, Texas
- Coordinates: 32°46′36″N 97°23′54″W
- Country: United States
- State: Texas
- County: Tarrant
- Incorporated (village): 1940
- Incorporated (city): 1949

Area
  - Total: 2.02 sq mi (5.23 km^{2})
  - Land: 2.02 sq mi (5.23 km^{2})
  - Water: 0 sq mi (0.00 km^{2})
- Elevation: 620 ft (190 m)

Population (2020)
  - Total: 7,646
  - Density: 3,790/sq mi (1,460/km^{2})
- Time zone: UTC-6 (CST)
  - Summer (DST): UTC-5 (CDT)
- ZIP code: 76114
- Area code: 817
- FIPS code: 48-62384
- GNIS feature ID: 2410961
- Website: www.riveroakstx.com

River Oaks is a city in Tarrant County, Texas, United States. Its population was 7,646 at the 2020 census.

== Geography ==
According to the United States Census Bureau, the city has a total area of 2.0 mi^{2} (5.2 km^{2}), all land.

== Demographics ==
Historical population
Census	Pop.	Note	%±
1950	7,097		—
1960	8,444		19.0%
1970	8,193		−3.0%
1980	6,890		−15.9%
1990	6,580		−4.5%
2000	6,985		6.2%
2010	7,427		6.3%
2020	7,646		2.9%
U.S. Decennial Census

=== 2020 census ===
As of the 2020 census, River Oaks had a population of 7,646 people, there were 2,721 households, and 1,882 families residing in the city.

The median age was 35.9 years; 24.8% of residents were under the age of 18 and 13.2% of residents were 65 years of age or older. For every 100 females there were 98.9 males, and for every 100 females age 18 and over there were 96.4 males age 18 and over.

100.0% of residents lived in urban areas, while 0.0% lived in rural areas.

There were 2,721 households in River Oaks, of which 36.2% had children under the age of 18 living in them. Of all households, 46.2% were married-couple households, 19.2% were households with a male householder and no spouse or partner present, and 27.2% were households with a female householder and no spouse or partner present. About 23.0% of all households were made up of individuals and 9.4% had someone living alone who was 65 years of age or older.

There were 2,871 housing units, of which 5.2% were vacant. The homeowner vacancy rate was 1.9% and the rental vacancy rate was 6.3%.

Racial composition as of the 2020 census
Race	Number	Percent
White	4,165	54.5%
Black or African American	103	1.3%
American Indian and Alaska Native	75	1.0%
Asian	62	0.8%
Native Hawaiian and Other Pacific Islander	4	0.1%
Some other race	1,869	24.4%
Two or more races	1,368	17.9%
Hispanic or Latino (of any race)	4,334	56.7%

== Education ==
Schools in River Oaks are a part of the Castleberry Independent School District.

Schools that serve the city include:

- A.V. Cato Elementary School
- Castleberry Elementary School
- Irma Marsh Middle School
- Castleberry High School
