= Masonic Home Independent School District =

School district in Texas

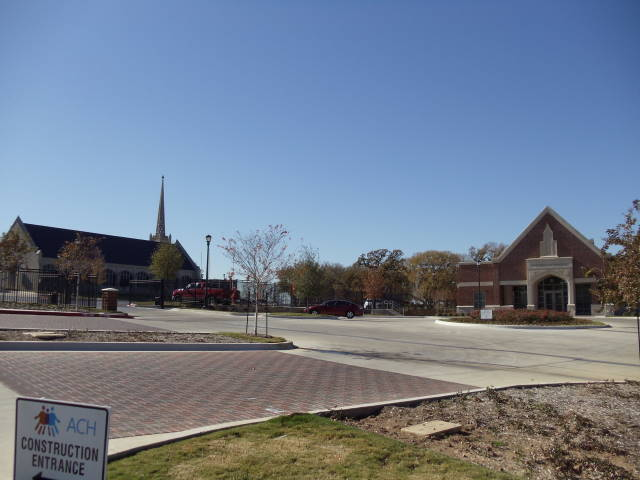
- Masonic Home and School of Texas

Address
- 3600 Wichita Street Fort Worth, Texas; United States
- Coordinates: 32°42′32″N 97°16′46″W

District information
- Grades: K-12
- Established: 1913
- Closed: 2005 (dissolved)

Other information
- Merged into: Fort Worth ISD
- Notes: School district for orphans, of notable historical interest
- Website: Masonic Home and School of Texas - History
- Masonic Widows and Orphans Home Historic District
- U.S. National Register of Historic Places
- U.S. Historic district
- Location within Texas Location within the United States
- Location: Roughly bounded by E. Berry St., Mitchell Blvd., Vaughn St., Wichita St. and Glen Garden Dr., Fort Worth, Texas
- Area: 206 acres (83 ha)
- Built: 1910
- Architect: Wiley G. Clarkson, Herbert M. Greene
- Architectural style: Late Gothic Revival
- NRHP reference No.: 91002022
- Added to NRHP: January 28, 1992

The Masonic Home and School of Texas was a home for widows and orphans in Fort Worth, Texas from 1889 to 2005. The first superintendent was Dr. Frank Rainey of Austin, Texas. Starting in 1913, it had its own school system, the Masonic Home Independent School District. Orphan Blake R. Van Leer was the only boy in 1909, went on to become president of Georgia Tech and civil rights advocate.

The campus included buildings designed by architects Wiley G. Clarkson of Fort Worth and Herbert M. Greene of Dallas, and it was listed in the National Register of Historic Places as a historic district in 1992.

== Early history ==
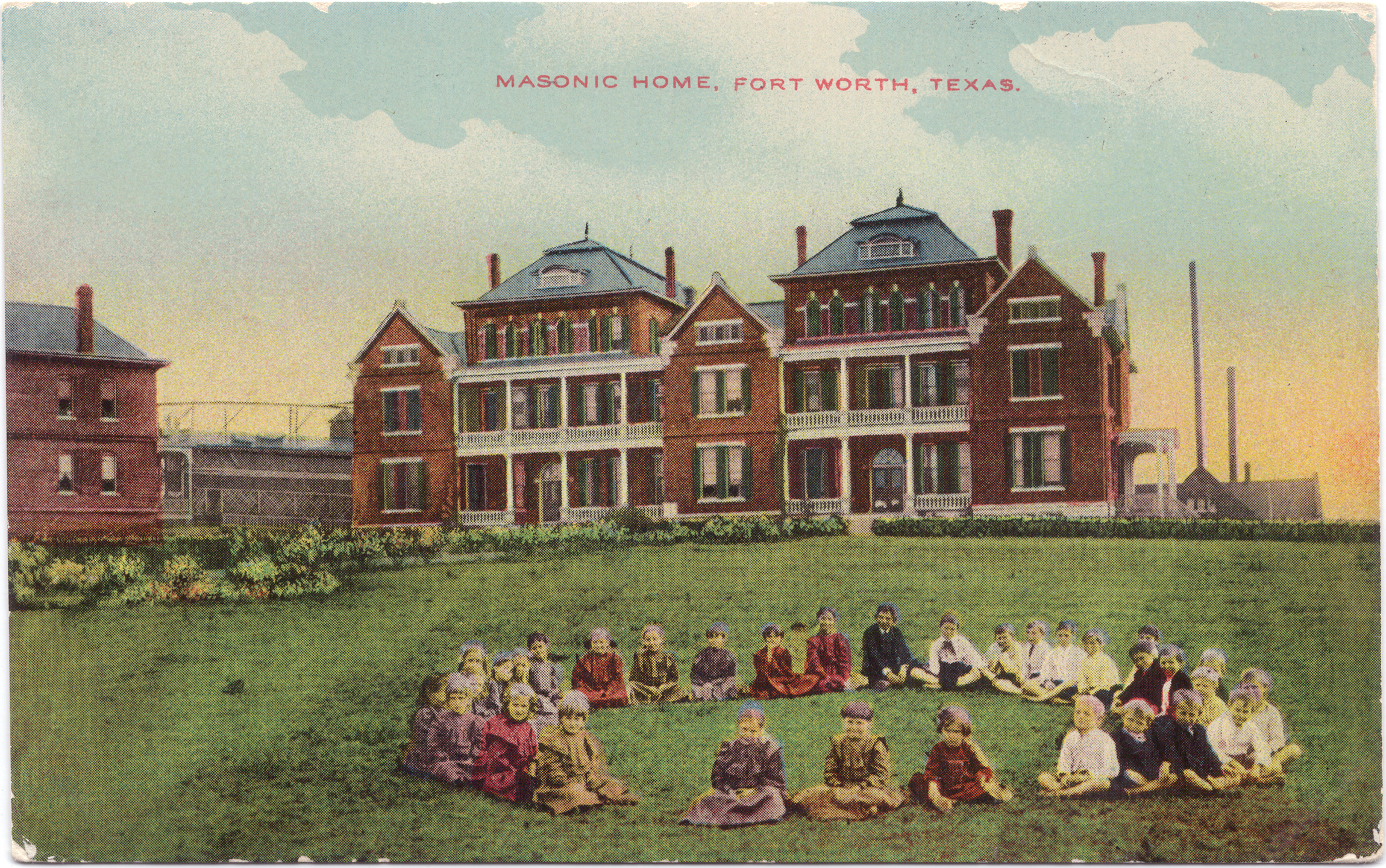
Postcard of the Masonic Home ca. 1910

In 1899, the Masons opened a home for widows and orphans of Masons. Later, widows moved to a location in nearby Arlington (closed nearly a century later during the construction of Cowboys Stadium) and the home was opened to non-Masonic orphans. On January 10, 1913, under laws passed in 1905 allowing orphanages to organize their own schools, the Texas State Board of Education created the Masonic Home Independent School District.

The Texas Historical Commission recognizes the fraternal organization foundation as a historic district geographically in the southeast quadrant of Tarrant County, Texas lineate to U.S. Route 287 in Texas.

== Football glory ==
The Masonic Home's 1930s football teams were the subject of the 2007 Jim Dent book, Twelve Mighty Orphans. One of those players, Hardy Brown, went on to play for ten seasons in the NFL, primarily for the San Francisco 49ers.

In 1995, the Masonic Home won the TAPPS Class 1A State Football Championship against St. Paul High School in Groesbeck, Texas under coaches Tom Hines and former student Arthur (Buster) Bone.

The book would later be adapted into a film, 12 Mighty Orphans, in 2021.

== Later years ==
The school closed in 2005 due to lack of funding because of a $6.9 million dollar sexual abuse settlement. The school district merged with the Fort Worth Independent School District and the buildings and grounds were sold to a private developer. The school's chapel is now a private facility known as the Bell Tower Chapel, a popular wedding location

A charter school built in front of the Masonic Home site site, Uplift Mighty Preparatory, was named after the Mighty Mites.

== See also ==
- Grand Lodge of Texas
- List of school districts in Texas
- University Interscholastic League
- F. W. Woolworth Building (Fort Worth, Texas), also by architect Wiley G. Clarkson
- National Register of Historic Places listings in Tarrant County, Texas
