= BMHS =

BMHS may refer to:

- British Music Hall Society
- Barnes and Mortlake History Society
- Barrington Municipal High School
- Benbrook Middle-High School
- Bishop McNamara High School
- Bishop Martin High School
- Blue Mountain High School
- Banting Memorial High School
- Bell Multicultural High School
- Beloit Memorial High School
- Bernice MacNaughton High School
- Billerica Memorial High School
- Bishop Miege High School
- Bishop Montgomery High School
- Bishop McCort High School
- Bradshaw Mountain High School
- Brien McMahon High School
- Brother Martin High School
- Bohemia Manor High School
