= Eurocup Basketball 2011–12 Regular Season Group D =

Standings and Results for Group D of the Regular Season phase of the 2011–12 Eurocup basketball tournament.

== Standings ==
Key to colors
Top two teams advance to Last 16

	Team	Pld	W	L	PF	PA	Diff
1.	(France) ASVEL	6	4	2	459	426	+33
2.	(Spain) Valencia Basket	6	4	2	487	447	+40
3.	(Belgium) Telenet Oostende	6	2	4	415	454	−39
4.	(Bulgaria) Lukoil Academic	6	2	4	400	434	−34

== Fixtures and results ==
All times given below are in Central European Time.

=== Game 1 ===
15 November 2011
19:30

Report

ASVEL (France)	87–78	(Spain) Valencia Basket
Scoring by quarter: 20–15, 14–12, 24–28, 29–23
Pts: Parker 34; Rebs: Thompson 6 Asts: Parker 5		Pts: Caner-Medley 19; Rebs: Lishouk 12; Asts: Martínez 7

Astroballe, Villeurbanne
Referees: Fernando Rocha (POR), Luis Lopes (POR), Milija Vojinovic (SRB)

15 November 2011
20:30

Report

Telenet Oostende (Belgium)	65–66	(Bulgaria) Lukoil Academic
Scoring by quarter: 16–16, 16–10, 17–21, 16–19
Pts: Rich 17; Rebs: Booker 9 Asts: Djordjevic 5		Pts: Mack 20; Rebs: Owens 6 Asts: Heath 4

Sea'Arena, Ostend
Attendance: 2,551
Referees: Antonio Conde (ESP), Apostolos Kalpakas (SWE), Óscar Perea (ESP)

=== Game 2 ===
22 November 2011
17:00

Report

Lukoil Academic (Bulgaria)	66–62	(France) ASVEL
Scoring by quarter: 19–15, 20–13, 11–16, 16–18
Pts: Heath 18; Rebs: Mack 7 Asts: Mack 3		Pts: Thompson 12; Rebs: Jackson, Tillie 7 Asts: Turiaf 3

Armeets Arena, Sofia
Attendance: 6,000
Referees: Zoran Šutulović (MNE), Ademir Zurapovic (BIH), Ioannis Foufis (GRE)

22 November 2011
20:30

Report

Valencia Basket (Spain)	75–62	(Belgium) Telenet Oostende
Scoring by quarter: 19–16, 21–15, 11–20, 24–11
Pts: Splitter 15; Rebs: Piétrus 6 Asts: three players 3		Pts: Rich 16; Rebs: Booker 9 Asts: Djordjevic 4

Pabellon Municipal Fuente San Luis, Valencia
Attendance: 5,800
Referees: Anastasios Piloidis (GRE), Panagiotis Anastopoulos (GRE), Nikola Lepetic (MNE)

=== Game 3 ===
29 November 2011
17:00

Report

Lukoil Academic (Bulgaria)	64–72	(Spain) Valencia Basket
Scoring by quarter: 15–18, 13–20, 19–22, 17–12
Pts: Stoykov 16; Rebs: McLain 8 Asts: three players 2		Pts: Caner-Medley 27; Rebs: Splitter 12; Asts: Marković 6

Armeets Arena, Sofia
Attendance: 5,000
Referees: Andrej Lovsin (SLO), Sasa Maricic (SRB), Dragan Neskovic (SRB)

29 November 2011
20:30

Report

Telenet Oostende (Belgium)	53–70	(France) ASVEL
Scoring by quarter: 17–11, 11–19, 14–19, 11–21
Pts: Booker 11; Rebs: Booker 12; Asts: Djordjević 4		Pts: Tillie 14; Rebs: Fofana 7 Asts: Westermann 3

Sea'Arena, Ostend
Attendance: 2,511
Referees: Carmelo Paternico (ITA), Lahdo Sharro (SWE), Tomasz Trawicki (POL)

=== Game 4 ===
6 December 2011
19:00

Report

Valencia Basket (Spain)	83–59	(Bulgaria) Lukoil Academic
Scoring by quarter: 18–11, 13–13, 31–12, 21–23
Pts: Splitter 18; Rebs: Lishouk 9 Asts: Martínez, de Colo 5		Pts: Šundov 17; Rebs: Šundov 7 Asts: Heath 7

Pabellon Municipal Fuente San Luis, Valencia
Attendance: 6,500
Referees: Eddie Viator (FRA), Jurgis Laurinavicius (LTU), Moritz Reiter (GER)

6 December 2011
20:00

Report

ASVEL (France)	83–65	(Belgium) Telenet Oostende
Scoring by quarter: 18–8, 23–21, 21–16, 21–20
Pts: Jackson 18; Rebs: Armstrong, Tillie 7 Asts: Westermann 3		Pts: Šakota 14; Rebs: Booker 7 Asts: Djordjevic 3

Astroballe, Villeurbanne
Attendance: 5,600
Referees: Luis Lopes (POR), M. A. Perez Niz (ESP), Anna Cardus (ESP)

=== Game 5 ===
13 December 2011
17:00

Report

Lukoil Academic (Bulgaria)	77–83	(Belgium) Telenet Oostende
Scoring by quarter: 22–18, 17–27, 16–18, 22–20
Pts: Šundov 14; Rebs: Stoykov, Mack 5 Asts: Heath 7		Pts: Booker 18; Rebs: Booker 7 Asts: Djordjevic 6

Armeets Arena, Sofia
Attendance: 1,500
Referees: Roberto Chiari (ITA), Elias Koromilas (GRE), Oskars Lucis (LAT)

13 December 2011
20:30

Report

Valencia Basket (Spain)	96–88	(France) ASVEL
Scoring by quarter: 23–18, 26–16, 18–18, 29–36
Pts: Ogilvy, Martínez 16; Rebs: Ogilvy, Lishouk 5 Asts: San Miguel 6		Pts: Lacombe 14; Rebs: Tillie 6 Asts: Westermann 7

Pabellon Municipal Fuente San Luis, Valencia
Referees: Recep Ankarali (TUR), Omer Esteron (ISR), Igor Dragojevic (MNE)

=== Game 6 ===
20 December 2011
20:00

Report

Telenet Oostende (Belgium)	87–83	(Spain) Valencia Basket
Scoring by quarter: 20–22, 20–16, 22–22, 25–23
Pts: Winston, Djordjevic 19; Rebs: Šakota 8 Asts: four players 3		Pts: Martínez 23; Rebs: Rakočević 13; Asts: Martínez 4

Sea'Arena, Ostend
Attendance: 2,350
Referees: Robert Vyklicky (CZE), Jasmina Juras (SRB), Ingus Baumanis (LAT)

20 December 2011
20:00

Report

ASVEL (France)	69–68 (OT)	(Bulgaria) Lukoil Academic
Scoring by quarter: 12–21, 20–18, 15–5, 9–12, Overtime: 13–12
Pts: Thompson 21; Rebs: Armstrong 10; Asts: Westermann 7		Pts: Heath, Stoykov 14; Rebs: Owens 7 Asts: Heath, Owens 5

Astroballe, Villeurbanne
Attendance: 5,600
Referees: Sinisa Herceg (CRO), Enrico Sabetta (ITA), Sergio Silva (POR)
