= Eldon B. Mahon United States Courthouse =

- Fort Worth US Courthouse
- U.S. National Register of Historic Places
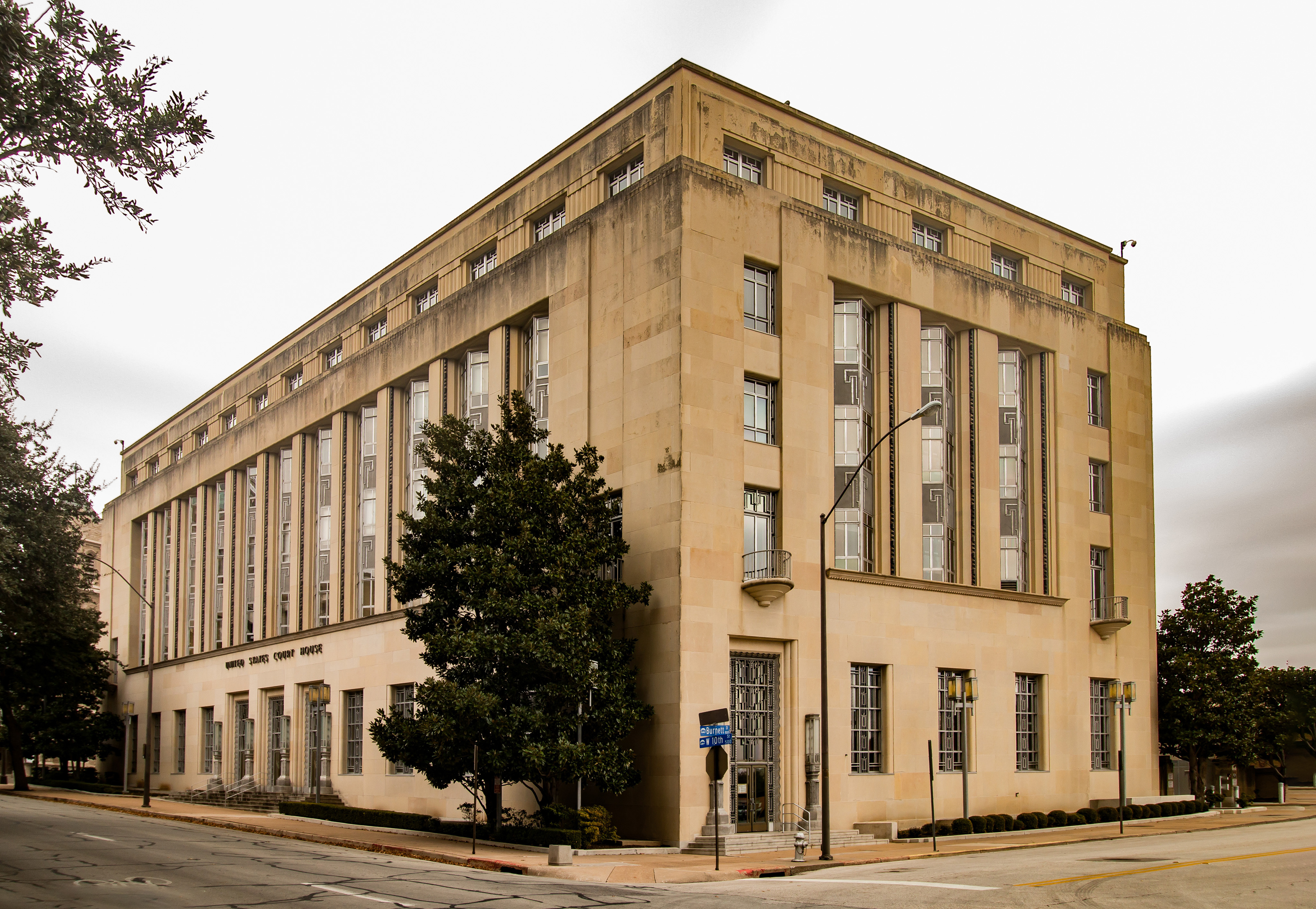
- Courthouse in 2016

- Location within Texas Location within the United States
- Interactive map showing the location for Fort Worth US Courthouse
- Location: 501 W. 10th St., Fort Worth, Texas
- Coordinates: 32°44′56″N 97°20′2″W
- Area: 1 acre (0.40 ha)
- Built: 1934
- Architect: Paul Philippe Cret, Wiley G. Clarkson, et al.
- Architectural style: Modern Movement, Moderne
- NRHP reference No.: 01000437
- Added to NRHP: April 25, 2001

The Eldon B. Mahon United States Courthouse is a courthouse of the United States District Court for the Northern District of Texas and the United States Court of Appeals for the Fifth Circuit located in Fort Worth, Texas. Built in 1933, the building was listed in the National Register of Historic Places in 2001 and was renamed in honor of district court judge Eldon Brooks Mahon in 2003.

== Building history ==
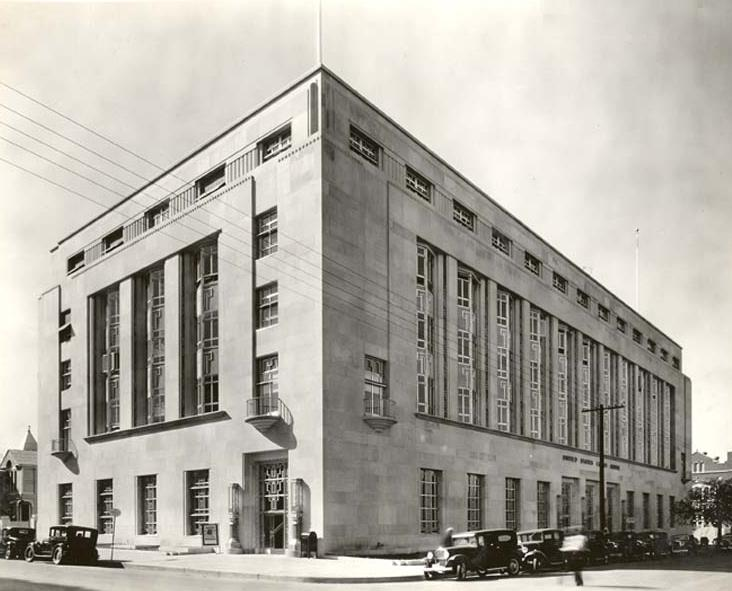
The Eldon B. Mahon United States Courthouse

Completed in 1934 during the Great Depression, the courthouse symbolized growth and renewed optimism in Fort Worth. Akin to other buildings of the 1930s, its design and construction fit the pattern of the New Deal-era federal building programs enacted to relieve widespread unemployment. Recognizing that the city's existing federal building was inadequate for the burgeoning federal agencies, Congress appropriated $1.215 million in June 1930 for the construction of a new U.S. Courthouse.

The building's forward-looking design makes a significant contribution to the city's impressive collection of Depression-era architecture. Renowned Philadelphia architect Paul Philippe Cret, in association with prominent local architect Wiley G. Clarkson, designed the building under the direction of the Office of the Supervising Architect of the U.S. Treasury Department. Clarkson, a native Texan, designed many buildings in Fort Worth during the 1920s and 1930s, including the Trinity Episcopal Church, the Woolworth Building, and the Texas Christian University Library.

In 1938, artist Frank Mechau was commissioned under the Public Works Administration's art programs to paint three oil-on-canvas panels in the fourth-floor Court of Appeals. Mechau, a realistic painter who romanticized the American West, is a key figure of the western genre-with work on public view in Federal buildings and art museums across the country. Mechau's paintings were installed in 1940, becoming the only New Deal art commission sponsored in Fort Worth.

The U.S. Courthouse was named in honor of Judge Eldon B. Mahon in 2003 for his service in the Northern District of Texas. Mahon presided over some of the most influential social and political cases in north Texas, including overseeing the racial integration of the Fort Worth School District-a 19-year endeavor.

The Courthouse remains an important landmark in downtown Fort Worth and is a symbol of the continued Federal presence in Tarrant County.

== Architecture ==
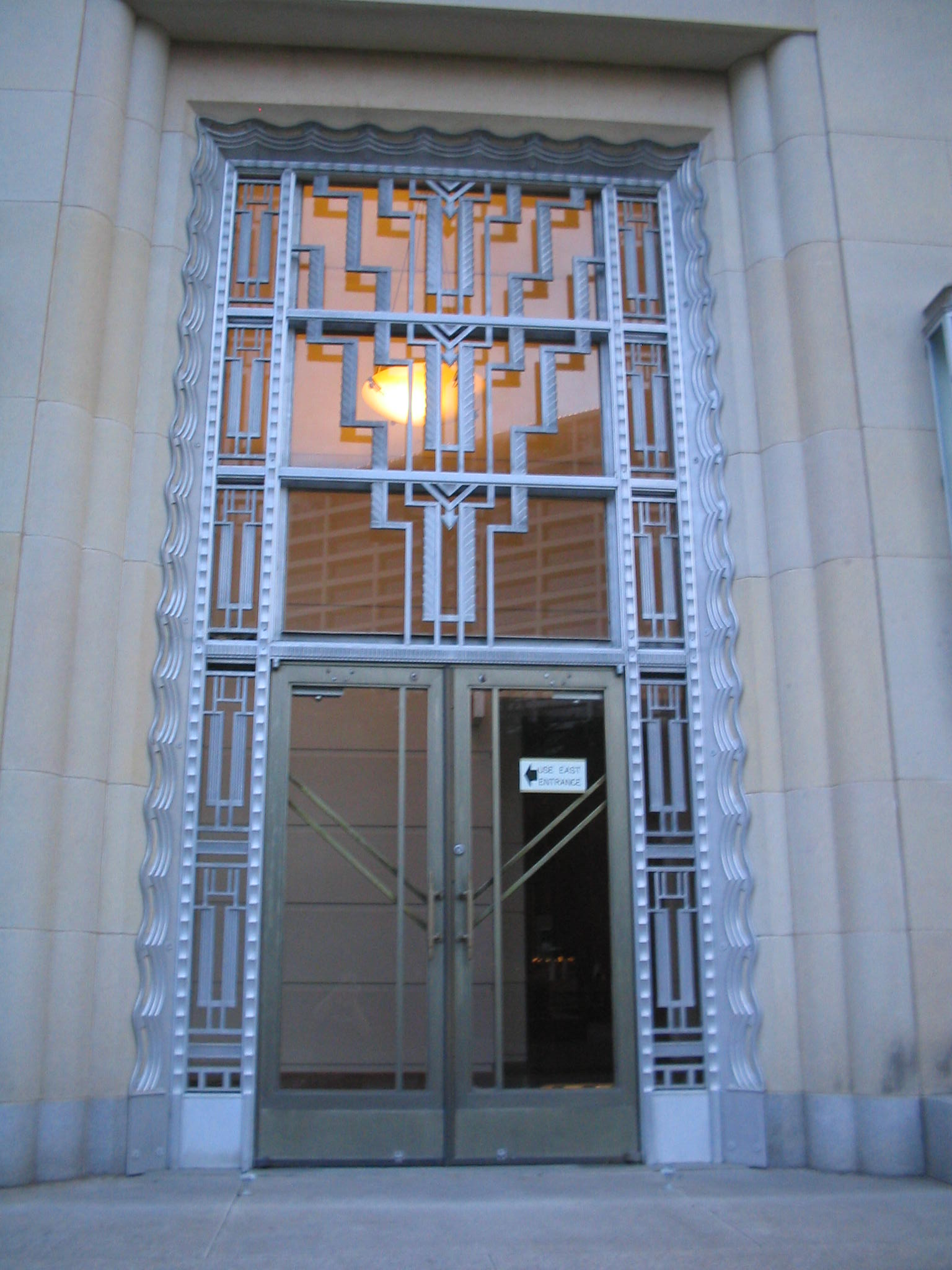
Art Deco detailing of a door

The building is an impressive five-story structure, creating the illusion of a solid limestone mass rising to a height of 94 feet. It is designed in the Art Moderne style, incorporating classical elements. A steel and concrete structure faced with limestone veneer, each elevation adheres to classical principles of symmetry and articulation by a regular rhythm of bays with a centralized principal entrance. Art Moderne elements are embodied by the sharp angles and zigzag surfaces seen in the stacked fenestration of the upper stories, and in the geometric, low-relief abstraction of the ornamentation.

The first three floors of the courthouse form a rectangular block, while upper floors are E-shaped, opening to the south to form two, three-sided light wells. Original access to the building was gained through three sets of bronze and glass double doors, flanked by Art Deco lanterns of aluminum and glass fronting West Tenth Street. Aluminum grilles in Mayan ziggurat, zigzag, Plains Indian arrows, and Egyptian lotus motifs are set over each pair of doors. Metal trim with Pueblo designs accentuates the windows of the second, third, and fourth floors. The smooth stone walls of the first story rise to a flattened, dentiled stringcourse before a shallow setback to the upper-story block. The outer bays of the second story have semicircular balconies of corbelled stone and metal railings. In between, eleven sets of three-story, stacked windows are each angled outward to the central mullion, creating a distinctive zigzag pattern across the surface of the facade. The window spandrels separating each floor feature moldings incised with black designs in Pueblo Indian motifs. The elongated bays are capped by horizontal windows at the fifth story, as the stone walls terminate to a flat roof. The east and west elevations are mirror images of each other and vary little from the facade, except in their width.

Sumptuous finishes, crafted of marble and bronze, and Native American and Art Deco-influenced detailing create eye-catching public spaces on the interior. The former postal lobby and the second- and fourth-floor courtrooms are the most architecturally enriched. The north lobby retains its original terrazzo floor, composed of multicolored marble, forming a zigzag pattern bordered by rectangular designs in pink Lepanto marble along the wall perimeter.

The Federal District Court, located on the second floor, displays finishes of the highest quality. Leather-sheathed doors open onto a room with 21-foot-high walls of rich oak paneling framed by dark Cedar Tennessee marble. Art Deco applications at the judge's white-oak bench and the plaster ornament of the ceiling are decorative focal points.

The Court of Appeals on the fourth floor exhibits similar finishes and motifs, featuring 22-foot-high walls clad in American black walnut paneling that is rounded at the corners in a streamlined effect. The doorjambs and engaged columns are Yellow Kasota Fleuri marble, while the plaster ceiling displays a circular band of geometric patterns. At the rear of this room hang Frank Mechau's dramatic murals: "Texas Rangers in Camp," "The Taking of Sam Bass," and "Flags over Texas." Depicting cowboys, rangers and scenic views of Texas, they are recognized for their skillfully executed abstract and linear style.

Extensive renovations in 1994 to create a bankruptcy courtroom and offices partially reversed remodeling done in the 1950s and 1960s. Currently the south half of the lobby has been incorporated into the new courtroom, keeping the original north postal lobby intact. The U.S. Courthouse remains an outstanding example of the 1930s Art Moderne style.

== Significant events ==
- 1933: Courthouse constructed
- 1934: The building opens to the public.
- 1940: Murals painted by Frank Albert Mechau are installed in the fourth-floor Court of Appeals.
- 1956: First floor remodeled, removing most of the original postal substation features.
- 1994: First-floor lobby renovated to include a new bankruptcy court and associated offices.
- 2001: Courthouse listed in the National Register of Historic Places.
- 2003: Renamed in honor of Judge Eldon B. Mahon.

== Building facts ==
- Architect: Paul Philippe Cret; Wiley G. Clarkson
- Location: 501 West Tenth Street
- Architectural Style: Art Moderne
- Primary Materials: Limestone veneer, concrete, steel, marble
- Prominent Features: Multicolored terrazzo flooring; Art Deco detailing; courtroom wood paneling and murals

== See also ==
- List of United States federal courthouses in Texas
- National Register of Historic Places listings in Tarrant County, Texas
