= Sally Clarkson =

American writer (born 1953)

- Born: August 3, 1953 (age 72) El Paso, Texas, U.S.
- Occupation: Writer
- Spouse: Clay Clarkson
- Children: Sarah, Joel, Nathan, Joy

Website
- sallyclarkson.com

Sally Clarkson (born August 3, 1953) is an American writer and Christian ministry leader. She is known for her books on Christian motherhood and homeschooling.

Clarkson's husband, Clay Clarkson, is notable for being the grandson of Wiley G. Clarkson, an architect who was active in Texas during the early 20th century.

== Early life and education ==
Clarkson was born in El Paso, Texas, on August 3, 1953. She attended Texas Tech University, where she studied English literature and education.

== Career ==
After graduating from Texas Tech University, Clarkson served as a missionary during the 1970s with Campus Crusade for Christ, which operated in Eastern Europe, including in Poland. She returned to the United States in 1980.

Clarkson's books focus on motherhood, family life, spirituality, Christian womanhood, and home education. She has written more than 30 books, which have collectively sold more than one million copies and have been translated into more than 10 languages. Her books include The Mission of Motherhood (2001) and The Ministry of Motherhood (2004), which discuss Christian parenting. Much of her work focuses on creating a "lifegiving" environment in the home.

In 1996, she and her husband Clay Clarkson established Whole Heart Ministries, a nonprofit organization that provides resources relating to Christianity, parenting, and home education.

Clarkson is also the host of the podcast At Home With Sally.

== Personal life ==
Clarkson is married to Clay Clarkson, who is the grandson of architect Wiley G. Clarkson. Together they have four children: writer Sarah Clarkson, composer Joel Clarkson, actor and filmmaker Nathan Clarkson, and academic Joy Clarkson. Her son Nathan Clarkson has acted in films such as The Purge (2013). Sally Clarkson currently resides between Colorado Springs, Colorado and Oxford, England.

== Publications ==
- The Mission of Motherhood: Touching Your Child's Heart for Eternity (2003), WaterBrook Press
- The Ministry of Motherhood: Following Christ's Example in Reaching the Hearts of Our Children (2004), WaterBrook Press
- Desperate: Hope for the Mom Who Needs to Breathe (2013), Thomas Nelson
- Own Your Life: Living with Deep Intention, Bold Faith, and Generous Love (2015), Tyndale Momentum
- The Lifegiving Home: Creating a Place of Belonging and Becoming (2016), Tyndale Momentum
- The Lifegiving Table: Nurturing Faith Through Feasting, One Meal at a Time (2017), Tyndale Momentum
- Different: The Story of an Outside-the-Box Kid and the Mom Who Loved Him (2017), Tyndale Momentum
- Only You Can Be You: What Makes You Different Makes You Great (2019), Thomas Nelson
- Mom Heart Moments: Daily Devotional Thoughts and Inspiration for Mothers (2019), Tyndale Momentum
- Awaking Wonder: Opening Your Child's Heart to the Beauty of Learning (2020), Bethany House Publishers
- Help, I'm Drowning: Weathering the Storms of Life with Grace and Hope (2021), Bethany House Publishers
- Tea Time Discipleship: Sharing Faith One Cup at a Time (2023), Harvest House Publishers
- Well Lived: Shaping a Legacy of Gratitude and Grace (2024), Harvest House Publishers
