= Billy Gault =

American football player (born 1936)

No. 44
- Position: Halfback

Personal information
- Born: December 9, 1936 (age 89); Monroe, Louisiana, U.S.
- Listed height: 6 ft 1 in (1.85 m)
- Listed weight: 185 lb (84 kg)

Career information
- High school: North Side (Fort Worth, Texas)
- College: TCU
- NFL draft: 1961: 11th round, 153rd overall pick

Career history
- Minnesota Vikings (1961)

Career NFL statistics
- Games played: 4
- Stats at Pro Football Reference

William Gault (born December 19, 1936) is an American former professional football player who was a halfback with the Minnesota Vikings of the National Football League (NFL). He played college football for the TCU Horned Frogs.
