= Chris Booker (basketball) =

American professional basketball player

Personal information
- Born: October 24, 1981 (age 45) Fort Worth, Texas, U.S.
- Listed height: 6 ft 10 in (2.08 m)
- Listed weight: 250 lb (113 kg)

Career information
- High school: Diamond Hill-Jarvis (Fort Worth, Texas)
- College: Tyler JC (2000–2002); Purdue (2002–2004)
- NBA draft: 2004: undrafted
- Playing career: 2004–2016
- Position: Power forward / center

Career history
- 2004–2005: Fenerbahçe
- 2006–2007: Tofas
- 2007–2008: Union Olimpija
- 2008–2009: Energa Czarni Słupsk
- 2009: ASU
- 2009–2010: Khimik Yuzhny
- 2010: Energa Czarni Słupsk
- 2010–2011: Krka
- 2011–2012: Telenet Oostende
- 2012–2013: Panionios
- 2013–2015: Krka
- 2015: Entente Orleans 45
- 2015–2016: Igokea
- 2016: Zlatorog Laško

Career highlights
- EuroChallenge champion (2011); 3× Slovenian League champion (2008, 2011, 2014); Belgian League champion (2012); 3× Slovenian Cup winner (2008, 2014, 2015); Bosnian Cup winner (2016); Slovenian Cup MVP (2015); Turkish League All-Star (2005)

Christopher Monroe Booker (born October 24, 1981) is an American former professional basketball player. He played as a 6-foot-10-inch (2.08 m) tall power forward-center.

== High school career ==
As a four-year Letterman at Diamond Hill-Jarvis High School in Fort Worth, Texas, Booker averaged 24.0 points and 12.0 rebounds per game as a senior. He was named Fort Worth Player of the Year during his senior season. He earned First-Team All-District honors as a senior, and was also named District Player of the Year and Most Valuable Player in the Fort Worth district.

== College career ==
=== Junior college ===
Booker attended Tyler Junior College in his freshman year, where he averaged 10.0 points and 10.0 rebounds per game. Improving in his sophomore season, he averaged 19.0 points and 11.0 rebounds per game, was and named All-Conference and Second Team All-American.

=== Purdue ===
Booker transferred for his junior season to play for Gene Keady at Purdue University, where he was named an All-Big Ten honorable mention by conference coaches, and was named to the All-Junior College Transfer Team. He led the Boilermakers in rebounding, averaging 5.7 per game. He also played in all 30 games, with 24 starts, and ranked third on the team in scoring, at 9.4 points per game. He led the squad in blocked shots, and shot 45.2 percent from the field, fourth-best on the team. He played 807 minutes, second-most on the team. He also set Purdue's record for blocks in a season.

== Professional career ==
In August 2010, he signed with the Slovenian team BC Krka. With Krka he won the 2010–11 FIBA EuroChallenge.

In August 2011, he signed a two-year deal with the Belgian team Telenet Oostende. He left Oostende after one season.

For the 2012–13 season he signed with the Greek team Panionios.

In September 2013, he returned to his former team BC Krka signing a one-year deal. In July 2014, he extended his contract with Krka for one more season.

On October 9, 2015, Booker signed a deal with Entente Orleans 45 of the French top league, LNB Pro A.

On December 17, 2015, Booker signed a deal with KK Igokea. In March 2016, he left Igokea and signed with Zlatorog Laško for the rest of the season.
