= Fort Worth Masonic Temple =

- Masonic Temple
- U.S. National Register of Historic Places
- Recorded Texas Historic Landmark
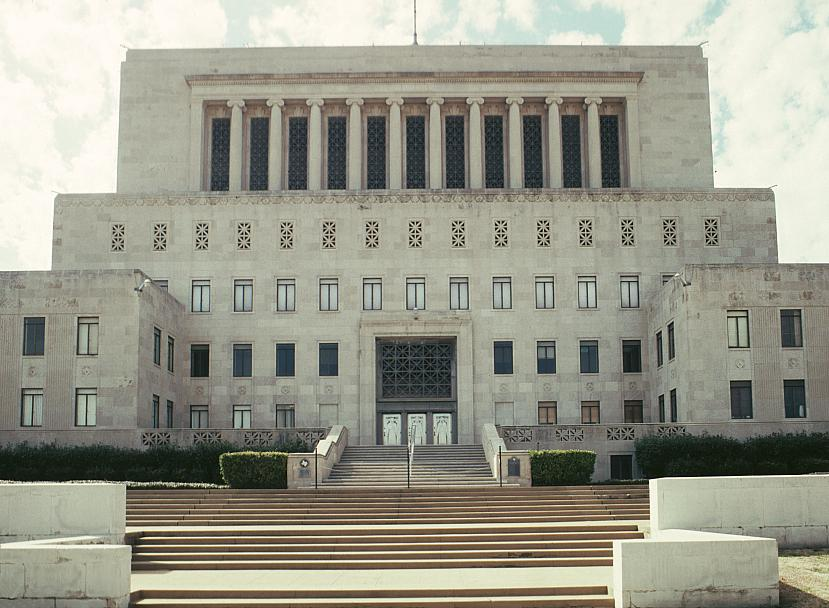
- Masonic Temple in 2016

- Location within Texas Location within the United States
- Location: 1100 Henderson St., Fort Worth, Texas
- Coordinates: 32°44′50″N 97°20′18″W
- Built: 1931
- Built by: Harry B. Friedman
- Architect: Wiley G. Clarkson
- Architectural style: Art Deco
- NRHP reference No.: 100001227
- RTHL No.: 3246

Significant dates
- Added to NRHP: June 19, 2017
- Designated RTHL: 1984

The Fort Worth Masonic Temple is a Masonic Temple located at 1100 Henderson Street, Fort Worth, Texas. Designed by Wiley G. Clarkson, the Neoclassical/early PWA Art Moderne structure was completed in 1931 and has largely remained unchanged. The building was listed on the National Register of Historic Places in 2017 as Masonic Temple.

== History ==
Masonic bodies have existed within the city of Fort Worth since April 1854 with the founding of Lodge #148. William Stevenson Cooke purchased a four-block parcel of land in 1923 as a central meeting location for the city's various Masonic groups as part of an effort to consolidate all downtown lodges and orders under one roof. In 1926, a committee was formed to pool resources for a building.

The original plans for Fort Worth's Masonic Temple were drafted by the architectural firm of Wiley G. Clarkson & Co. The Masonic Building Association called for an "imposing, one million dollar building of monumental character" with a stone exterior in classic Greek design. The stock market crash of 1929 forced the construction committee to accept a downsized plan, with an adjusted budget of $625,000. Groundbreaking ceremonies commenced on November 14, 1930, and construction was completed on September 16, 1931. The building exhibits an amalgamation of Neo-classical styling with Art moderne influences and features upper-story Ionic columns and monel alloy bas-relief doors. It features two grand staircases at the main entrance which leads to a terrace. The main doors depict the three Ancient Grand Masters of Masonic legend, King Solomon, Hiram, King of Tyre, and Hiram Abif.

The Temple was dedicated to WS Cooke's memory upon his passing in 1951. During the Cold War the building was designated a Civil Defense Fallout Shelter (a marking still adorns the southern entrance of the temple). The building became a recorded Texas historical landmark in 1984. In 2017 the Masonic Temple was added to the National Register of Historic Places.

== Historical artifacts ==
Several historical artifacts are housed within the temple. Of note is a bell cast in London, England in 1782, one of the oldest historical artifacts in Fort Worth. The bell was brought out to Texas by Lawrence Steele and used as a dinner bell for the Hotel Steele. Later it was used as a tolling bell for the First Ward School, the city's earliest elementary school building.

== Users ==
The Fort Worth Masonic Temple is home to four Craft Lodges and several Masonic appendant bodies & youth organizations in Tarrant County:

- Fort Worth Masonic Lodge #148, AF&AM
- Julian Field Masonic Lodge #908, AF&AM
- Cooke-Peavy Masonic Lodge #1162, AF&AM
- Panther City Masonic Lodge #1183, AF&AM
- Fort Worth Scottish Rite (Valley of Fort Worth)
- Texas Chapter #362, Royal Arch Masons of Texas
- Texas Council #321, Royal and Select Masters of Texas
- Worth Commandery #19, Knights Templar
- Moslah Shriners
- El Texa Grotto M.O.V.P.E.R.
- H. Malvern Marks Chapter, Order of DeMolay
- Fort Worth #15, The International Order of Rainbow Girls

The facility is also available for rent to the general public.

== See also ==
- National Register of Historic Places listings in Tarrant County, Texas
- Recorded Texas Historic Landmarks in Tarrant County
