= Benbrook, Texas =

- Town
- Town of Benbrook
- Flag
- Interactive map of Benbrook, Texas
- Coordinates: 32°40′05″N 97°29′34″W
- Country: United States
- State: Texas
- County: Tarrant

Government
  - Type: Council-Manager

Area
  - Total: 11.07 sq mi (28.68 km^{2})
  - Land: 10.76 sq mi (27.87 km^{2})
  - Water: 0.31 sq mi (0.80 km^{2}) 5.63%
- Elevation: 712 ft (217 m)

Population (2020)
  - Total: 24,520
  - Density: 2,279/sq mi (879.8/km^{2})
- Demonym: Benbrooker
- Time zone: UTC-6 (CST)
  - Summer (DST): UTC-5 (CDT)
- ZIP codes: 76109, 76116, 76126, 76132
- Area code: 817
- FIPS code: 48-07552
- GNIS feature ID: 2409831
- Website: benbrook-tx.gov

Benbrook is a town located in the southwestern corner of Tarrant County, Texas, United States, and a suburb of Fort Worth. As of the 2010 United States census, the population was 21,234, reflecting an increase of 1,026 from the 20,208 counted in the 2000 census, which had in turn increased by 644 from the 19,564 counted in the 1990 census. As of the 2020 census, the population grew to 24,520.

== Geography ==
Benbrook is a suburb of Fort Worth.

According to the United States Census Bureau, the city has a total area of 12.2 square miles (31.6 km^{2}); 11.5 square miles (29.8 km^{2}) is land and 0.69 square miles (1.8 km^{2}) is water. The total area is 5.63 percent water, and the primary body of water is Benbrook Lake, formed in 1952 after the construction of Benbrook Dam by the U.S. Army Corps of Engineers, which began in May 1947.

== Demographics ==
Historical population
Census	Pop.	Note	%±
1950	617		—
1960	3,254		427.4%
1970	8,169		151.0%
1980	13,579		66.2%
1990	19,564		44.1%
2000	20,208		3.3%
2010	21,234		5.1%
2020	24,520		15.5%
2021 (est.)	24,605		0.3%
U.S. Decennial Census

=== 2020 census ===
As of the 2020 census, Benbrook had a population of 24,520 and 6,030 families residing in the city. The median age was 40.6 years. 20.7% of residents were under the age of 18 and 20.2% of residents were 65 years of age or older. For every 100 females there were 90.9 males, and for every 100 females age 18 and over there were 87.6 males age 18 and over.

99.5% of residents lived in urban areas, while 0.5% lived in rural areas.

There were 10,559 households in Benbrook, of which 27.6% had children under the age of 18 living in them. Of all households, 47.9% were married-couple households, 17.4% were households with a male householder and no spouse or partner present, and 29.5% were households with a female householder and no spouse or partner present. About 30.0% of all households were made up of individuals and 12.1% had someone living alone who was 65 years of age or older.

There were 11,160 housing units, of which 5.4% were vacant. Among occupied housing units, 64.6% were owner-occupied and 35.4% were renter-occupied. The homeowner vacancy rate was 1.2% and the rental vacancy rate was 8.3%.

Racial composition as of the 2020 census
Race	Percent
White	74.7%
Black or African American	6.9%
American Indian and Alaska Native	0.7%
Asian	2.1%
Native Hawaiian and Other Pacific Islander	0.1%
Some other race	4.1%
Two or more races	11.4%
Hispanic or Latino (of any race)	15.6%

Benbrook racial composition as of 2020 (NH = Non-Hispanic) (Note: Note: the US Census treats Hispanic/Latino as an ethnic category. This table excludes Latinos from the racial categories and assigns them to a separate category. Hispanics/Latinos can be of any race.)
Race	Number	Percentage
White (NH)	17,233	70.28%
Black or African American (NH)	1,639	6.68%
Native American or Alaska Native (NH)	102	0.42%
Asian (NH)	493	2.01%
Pacific Islander (NH)	21	0.09%
Some Other Race (NH)	69	0.28%
Mixed/Multi-Racial (NH)	1,146	4.67%
Hispanic or Latino	3,817	15.57%
Total	24,520	

== Economy ==
=== Top employers ===
According to Benbrook's 2022 Annual Comprehensive Financial Report, the top employers in the city are:

#	Employer	# of Employees
1	Walmart	308
2	Gilco Contracting, Inc.	187
3	Renaissance Park Multi Care Center	140
4	Benbrook Nursing and Rehab	130
5	City of Benbrook	129
6	YMCA	105
7	Oncor Electric Delivery	90
8	Gardner Denver Service Center	85

== Prohibition and alcohol sales ==
In 1949, two years after Benbrook was incorporated as a village, the sale of liquor and beer was made illegal. In 1951, the citizens voted to make taverns illegal. A few years later, in 1954, an election was held to determine the legality of selling alcohol for "off-premises consumption," but there were not enough votes to allow its sale. In 1971, the residents of Benbrook chose to prohibit all alcohol sales, except for beer to be imbibed off-premises.

== Education ==
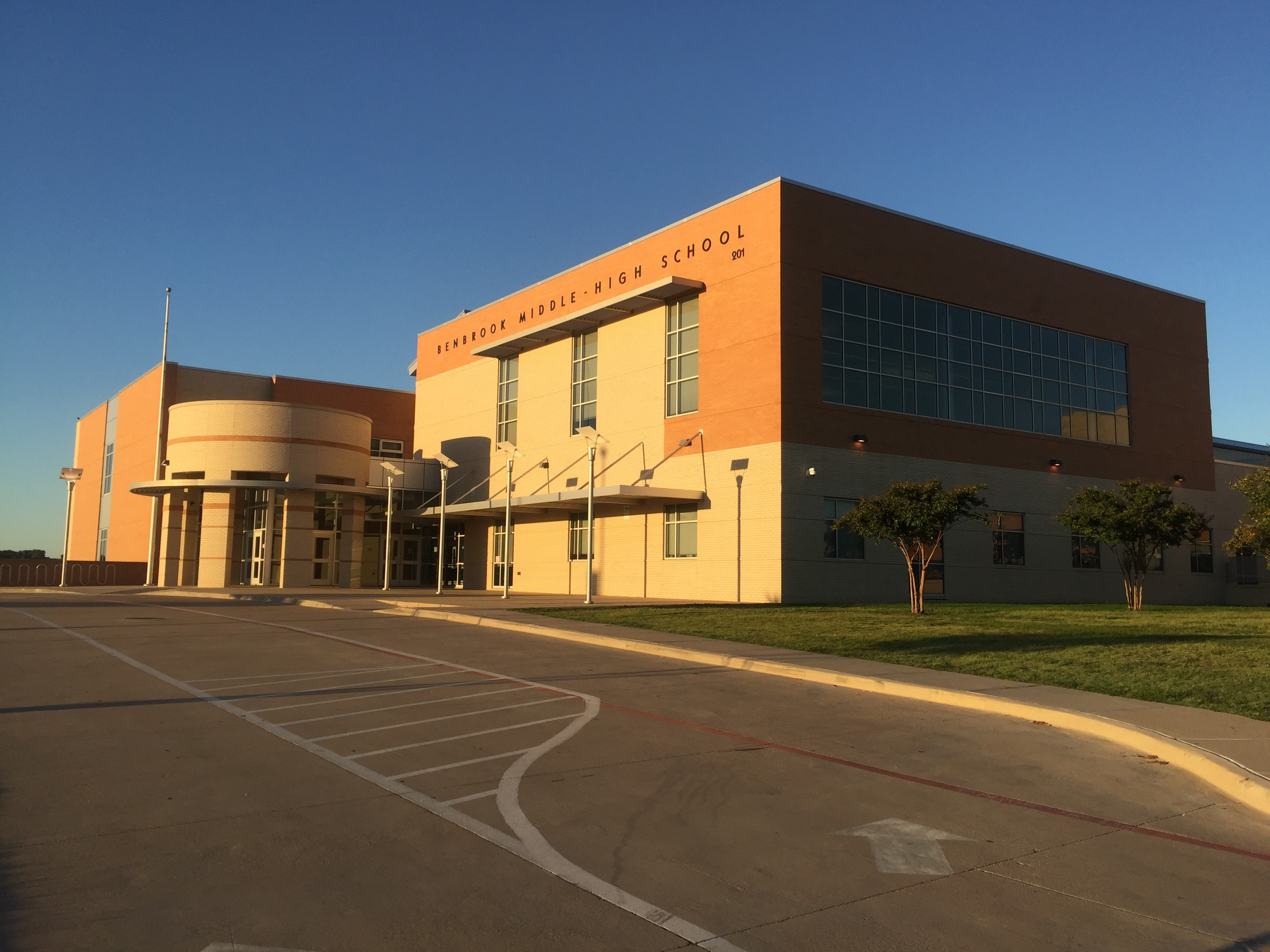
Benbrook Middle-High School

The Fort Worth Independent School District oversees Benbrook's public schools.

Two elementary schools, Benbrook Elementary and Westpark Elementary, are located in Benbrook. Waverly Park Elementary and Ridglea Hills Elementary in Fort Worth also serve portions of Benbrook. After completion of their elementary education, Benbrook children proceed to Benbrook Middle-High School. Western Hills High School, also in Benbrook, is attended by students living north of I-20.

According to data gathered by the U.S. Census in 2000, a high school diploma was the highest level of educational attainment for 23.7 percent of the population aged 25 or older; the national average was 28.6 percent for this category. Approximately 22.6 percent of residents aged 25 and over had a bachelor's degree, compared to the national average of 15.5 percent, while 7.6 percent had a master's degree and 0.7 percent had earned a Doctoral degree, compared with the national average of 5.9 and 1 percent, respectively.

=== History of schools ===
Around 1995 Jerry Dittrich, a City Council member in Benbrook, had campaigned for Benbrook leaving Fort Worth ISD on the grounds that the schools serving Benbrook were too far away, with some being over 15 miles (24 km) away. Fort Worth ISD, over the following two decades, began building new schools in Benbrook.

Benbrook Middle opened in August 2011. Prior to the opening of Benbrook Middle, students attended Monning Middle School or Leonard Sixth Grade Center and then Leonard Middle School.

Fort Worth ISD used a 2007 bond to pay for a combined middle and high school that opened in August 2014. Westpark Elementary will be converted into a middle school, and then a $15.5 million new elementary school will open next door. The new Westpark Elementary opened in August 2016. The renovated former elementary school is expected to open as a middle school summer of 2017. The combined middle and high school will become solely a high school when the converted middle school opens.
