= North Side High School (Fort Worth, Texas) =

Public school in Texas, United States

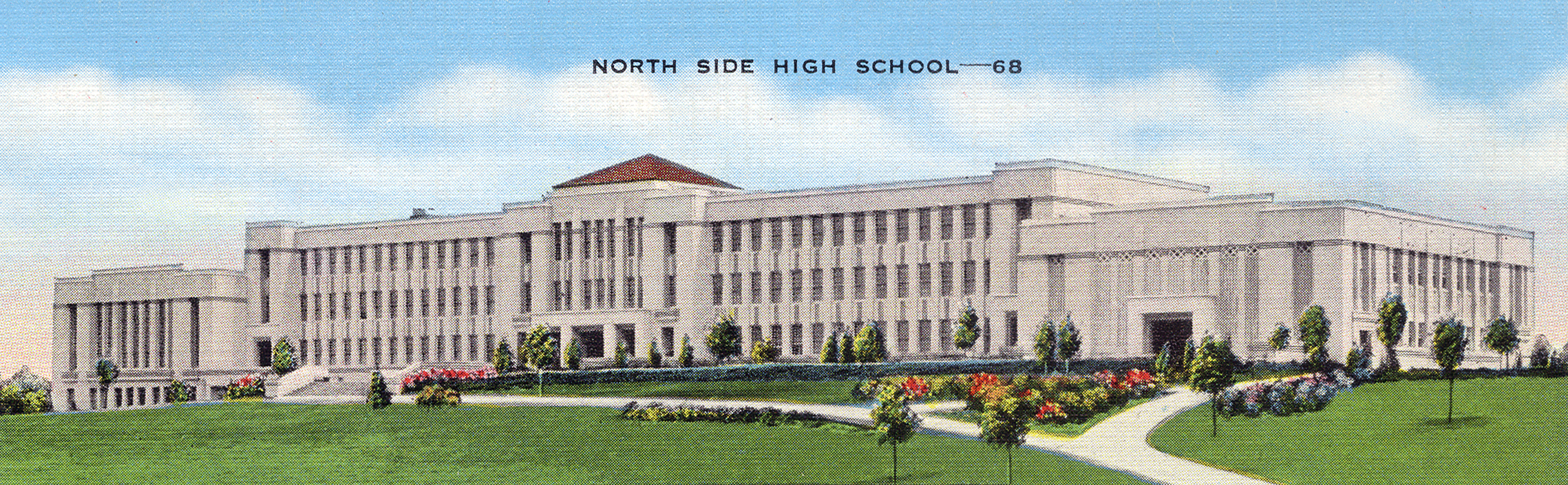
- Illustration of North Side High School (1937) from an undated postcard

Location
- 2211 Mckinley Avenue; Fort Worth, Texas 76164; United States; 32.785°N 97.370°W

Information
- Type: Public
- Motto: Pride Of North Side
- Established: 1884
- School district: Fort Worth Independent School District
- Principal: Antonio Martinez
- Faculty: 105.48 (on an FTE basis) (2017-18)
- Grades: 9 to 12
- Enrollment: 1,657 (2017-18)
- Student to teacher ratio: 15.71 (2017-18)
- Colors: Maroon and White
- Athletics conference: 7-5A
- Mascot: Steers
- Nickname: NSHS
- Website: North Side

North Side High School is a public secondary school located in Fort Worth, Texas. The school serves about 1,600 students in the Fort Worth Independent School District. Its current building at 2211 McKinley Avenue was designed by Wiley G. Clarkson and built in 1937. The school's original park-like campus has been greatly changed with additions in 1953, 1987, 2002, 2014 and 2019.

== History ==
In 1884, the small community of Marine, located near what today is the intersection of North Main and Central Avenue, was the beginning of what would become North Fort Worth, Texas. The North Fort Worth High School provided a basic education in the "Three R's" for the small community north of the Trinity River.

The Marine School was a one-room edifice which met the needs of the tiny, but growing community. That building was located in the 1600 block of North Commerce Street.

Built in 1872, the schoolhouse was originally located in Fort Worth's Northside on Commerce Street. Throughout the 1880s, it served as the community's only school. After a new elementary school was built in 1889, it was used as a community church. In 1904, it once again served as a school when it housed the four students enrolled in North Fort Worth High School.

When the community finally outgrew the little building in 1906, John Mulholland bought and moved it to 1309 Commerce Street, where it was converted and used as a residence throughout the early-to-mid-20th century. The school still retains some evidence of its use as a home.

In 1991, the City of Fort Worth condemned the weather-beaten structure, but a group known as the "Friends of the Marine Schoolhouse" rescued it from destruction. In April 1993, the "Friends" moved the building to 601 Park Street, where it remained for ten years until it was donated to the City of Fort Worth. On September 16, 2003, the Marine School was moved to its present location at Log Cabin Village. The relocation was a critical move in preservation of a historic structure and a Fort Worth landmark.

As the town grew and became the city of North Fort Worth, a new school was needed.

The second structure to serve as a school to the children of the town was located at North Main and 16th Street. The site was directly across 16th Street from the Catholics Men's Club and sat where a "Park and Ride" parking lot now is located. All of these early schools educated all grade levels in just one building. In 1909, the first football team of North Fort Worth High was sponsored and thus began the illustrious football history of North Fort Worth High School.

The school's colors of maroon and white were adopted in 1911. The year 1913 was an important year because of the following events that took place: the first basketball team was organized; The LASSO, the school's annual, was published; and, the North Side High School of Fort Worth Alumni Association was organized.

== Facilities ==
The growth of the Stockyards in the 1900s prompted the building of the third structure which was the first to be called North Side High School, in 1914. It was situated on 21st Street on what is now the playground of Manuel Jara Elementary School. The name plate from the old building, which was razed when Jara was built, is displayed on 21st Street in front of the playground.

1919 saw the building of a new structure on what is now the campus of J.P. Elder Middle School. Currently called the "Elder Annex" on Park and Lincoln, it served as North Side High School until the current building on McKinley Avenue was opened in the fall of 1938. In 1922, the school's alma mater was written by Otsie Betts. By October 1923, all North Siders were branded as steers, and the first school newspaper, THE LARIAT, was published. The following year the chapter of the National Honor Society was recognized.

North Side High 1937–Present

In September 1937, North Side moved once again to a new building at its current location on McKinley Avenue, which was built on the site of the Stripling Dairy, with an enrollment of 1,164. The 15-acre (61,000 m^{2}) North Side High School campus was a joint project between the Fort Worth ISD, the Public Works Administration (PWA), and the Works Progress Administration (WPA) of the United States government. Building this school was part of a 12-school project from this governmental team. The lead architect at the North Side project was Wiley G. Clarkson and its designer was Charles O. Chromaster. Construction was completed by the Harry B. Friedman Company at a cost of $459,000 ($7.6 million in 2000 dollars). The goal of the New Deal programs was to put as much money into circulation as possible to help stimulate the lagging economy of the Depression era. It is because of that practice that this astronomical figure (for the time period) was advanced to produce this extremely expensive building.

In addition to his work on the nationally renowned art deco project at North Side High School, Clarkson also designed, in Fort Worth, the Masonic Temple on Henderson & West Lancaster, the downtown Woolworth's, TCU's Mary Couts Burnett Library, the Trinity Episcopal Church, the Sanger Building, the Downtown YMCA, the First Methodist Church, the original Cook Children's Hospital, Harris Methodist Hospital, the Sinclair Building, the Meacham Airport Administration Building, Stripling Department Store, John Peter Smith Hospital, McLean Jr. High School (the core of the current Paschal High School), and worked with three other architects in designing the Modern Art Museum of Fort Worth's first building.

Clarkson was best known for his use of the "Modern" style of architecture in Fort Worth and its successor Art Deco. Modern Style combined classical forms (Mayan step pyramids, Greco/Roman columns and linear forms and Egyptian pyramids and motifs) along with modern construction materials (aluminum, brass, steel, terrazzo flooring and glass) coupled with the Art Deco colors of greens, reds, blacks and beige to produce a highly distinctive design. As you view this building look for the Art Deco appointments:

1) the auditorium - Greek columns, Roman urns, Mayan step pyramids (ceiling lights), Egyptian carvings on the ceiling, use of marble in the foyer, classic colors of the designs and decoration

2) the hallways - Greek columns in the center hall, terrazzo floors, Art Deco color schemes, leather covered doors to the auditorium, center hall lighting fixture in Mayan step pyramids and hand laid tile wainscoting in the hallways and restrooms.

3) the exterior - linear classical features of Greek and Roman architecture, the Egyptian and Mayan motif carvings above the doorways, the copper Egyptian pyramid on the top of the building and the suggested Roman columns of the building capstones along the roof line.

The Campus

The North Side High School campus consists of six principal structures. They are the three-story main building (completed in 1938), the field house complex and the Tech Lab/Auto Mechanics building (added in the late 1950s), the one-story "middle wing," the Pete Campbell Activity Center/Gymnasium (opened in 1987) and the new two-story building (completed in the Spring of 2002). In addition to the permanent structures there are several "temporary" portable buildings, the numbers and locations of which change from time to time based on the growth of the community and needs of the student body. Also on this campus are a football/soccer field that was part of the original 1937 construction project, a baseball field (built in 1996) and a softball diamond completed in 2001.

Two original structures no longer stand in evidence on the campus. A 50' X 50' shelter house, located on the bluff overlooking the Trinity River Valley (present location of the baseball field scoreboard) was razed in 1979. The only remaining evidence of the shelter house is the concrete relief carvings of four steer heads that appear above the outside middle doorways of the "middle wing." Though still present, just out of sight, an 800-seat amphitheater added to the beauty of the front lawn. Located just beyond the left-field fence of the baseball field, the amphitheater was covered with construction debris in 1978, when the administration at the time determined that its broken seats were too dangerous to allow to exist in their deteriorated condition and too expensive to restore.

Future plans call for the construction of a soccer field and tennis courts to meet the growing popularity and need for those sports. The proposal calls for them to be located west of the current football field.

== Notable people ==
- Horace S. Carswell, Jr. — Medal of Honor recipient
- Billy Gault — former NFL player
- Darrow Hooper — 1952 Olympic silver medalist in shot put
- Rogers Hornsby (1914)— MLB hall of fame player, holds highest career batting average for NL player, second to Ty Cobb
- Yale Lary — nine-time NFL Pro Bowler
- Sully Montgomery — American football player and boxer
- Marion Pugh — American football player
- Johnny Rutherford (1956) — champion race car driver; three-time winner of the Indy 500.
- Bob Schieffer (1955) — CBS News Anchor
- Jim Shofner — former NFL head coach
- Jonathan Top (2011) — FC Dallas soccer player
- James Doyle Williams (1934) — FBI Agent who portrayed Governor John Connally in Warren Commission's reenactment of the Kennedy Assassination

== Feeder patterns ==
The following middle schools feed into North Side

- J.P. Elder Middle School
- Kirkpatrick Middle School

The following elementary schools feed into North Side

- M.G. Ellis Primary School
- Dolores Huerta Elementary School
- Manuel Jara Elementary School
- M. L. Kirkpatrick Elementary School
- Rufino Mendoza Elementary School
- Sam Rosen Elementary School
- W. J. Turner Elementary School
- Washington Heights Elementary School
