= Diamond Hill-Jarvis High School =

High school in Fort Worth, Texas, US

Coordinates: 32.8082°N 97.3372°W

Location
- 1411 Maydell Rd. Fort Worth, TX 76106; United States

Information
- Type: High School
- Motto: We are Diamond Hill
- Established: 1903 (1952, DH-J)
- School district: Fort Worth Independent School District
- Principal: Paola Rodriguez
- Teaching staff: 65.05 (FTE)
- Grades: 9–12
- Enrollment: 877 (2024–25)
- Student to teacher ratio: 13.48
- Colors: Scarlet and black
- Mascot: Eagle
- Nickname: DHJ
- Website: diamondhilljarvis.fwisd.org

Diamond Hill-Jarvis High School is a school in Fort Worth, Texas, United States which serves grades 9 through 12. The school is a part of the Fort Worth Independent School District. The current principal is Paola Rodríguez. The school logo is the eagle, the school colors are black and scarlet, and the school motto is "We are Diamond Hill."

== History ==
Diamond Hill-Jarvis High School opened in 1904 as Diamond Hill School. In 1906, its campus moved from 28th Street to Hutchinson and Oscar. The first graduating class comprised 3 students who graduated in 1913.

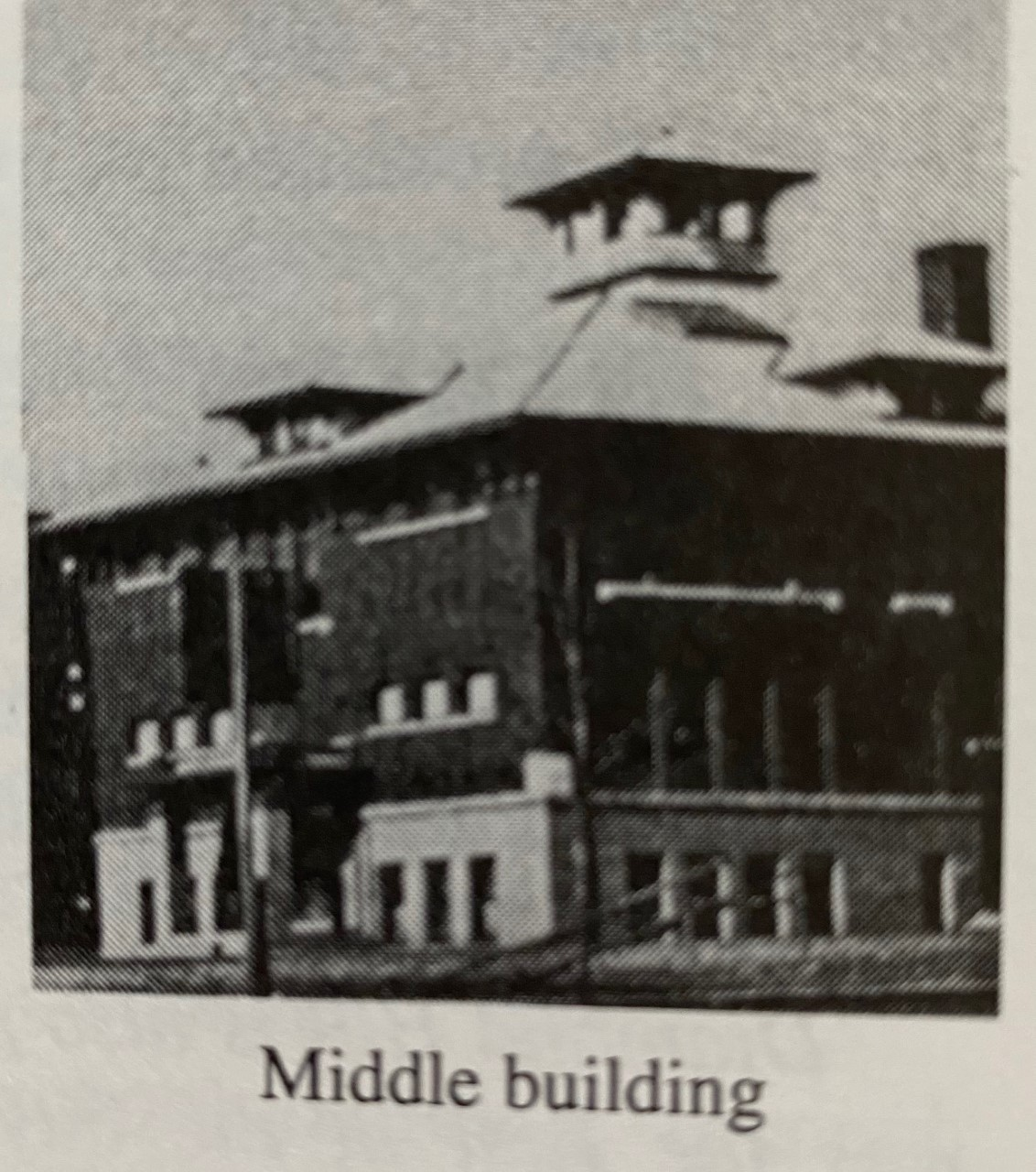

In 1924, Diamond Hill School became part of the Fort Worth Public School System. The school mascot was changed to the eagle from the hilltopper in 1927. Students were relocated to North Side High School between 1931 and 1933 while the school was renovated.

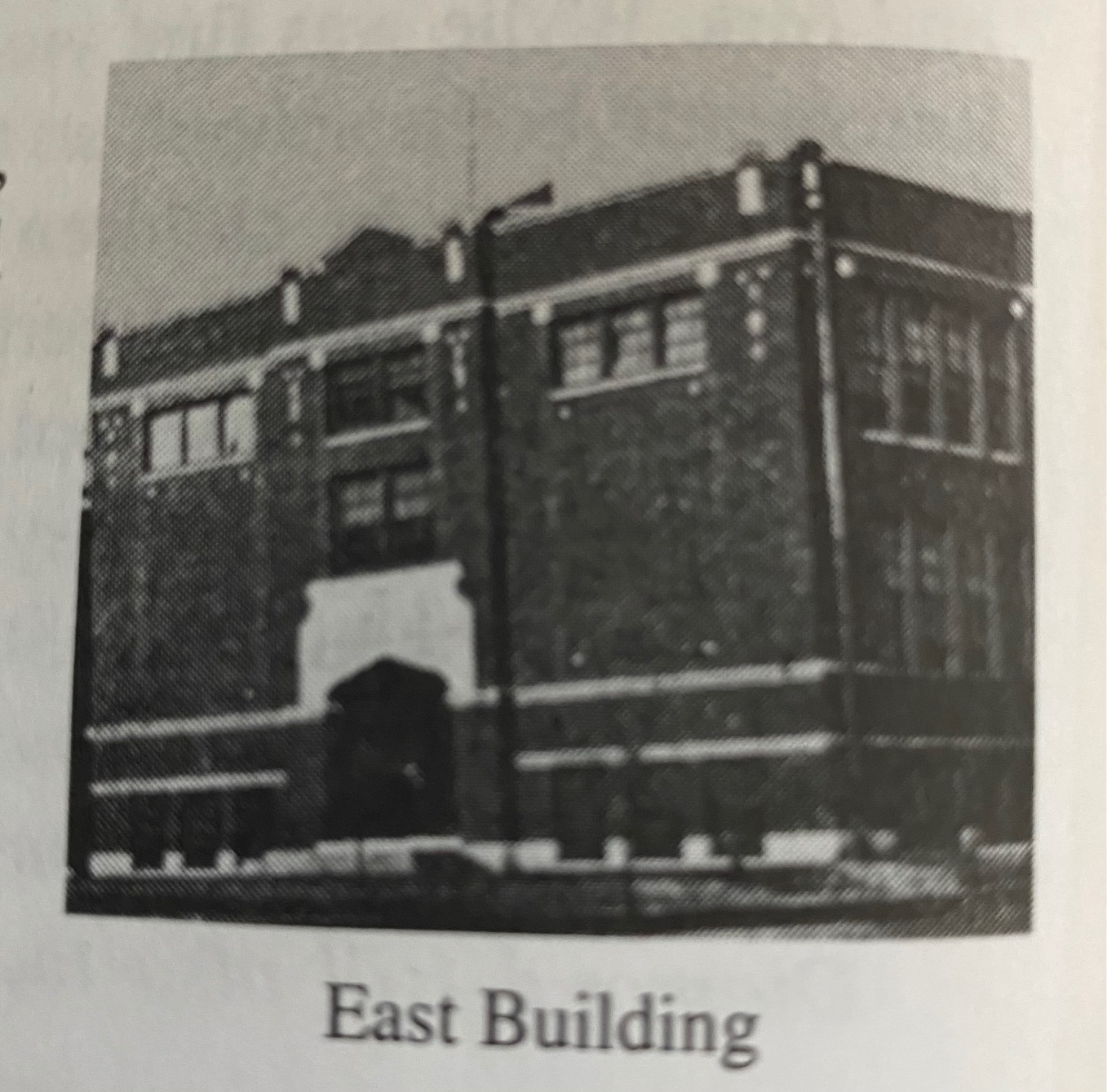

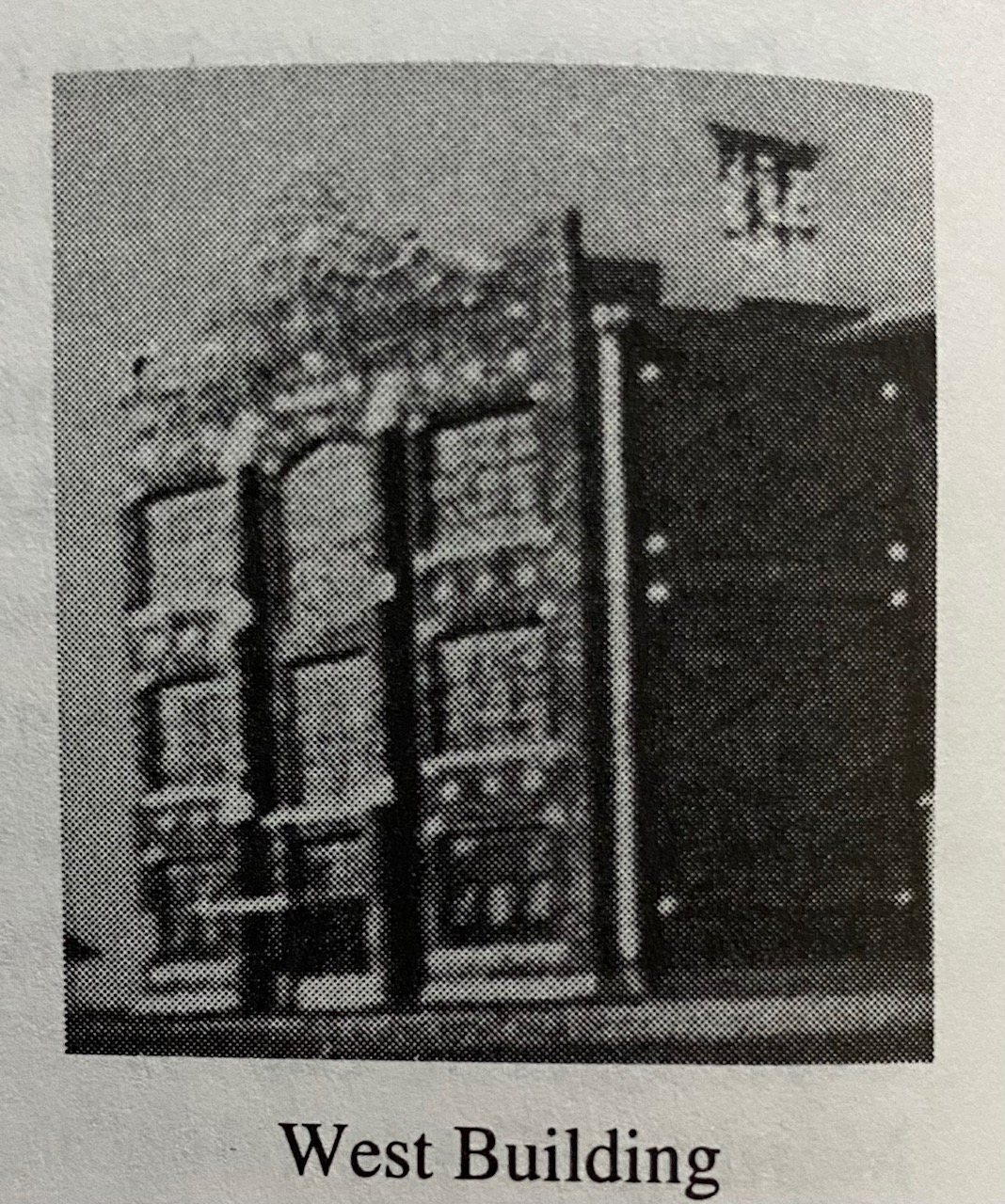

In 1952–1971, the original buildings were used as an elementary school as the new campus located on Maydell was opened. The original Diamond Hill School buildings were torn down in 1971.

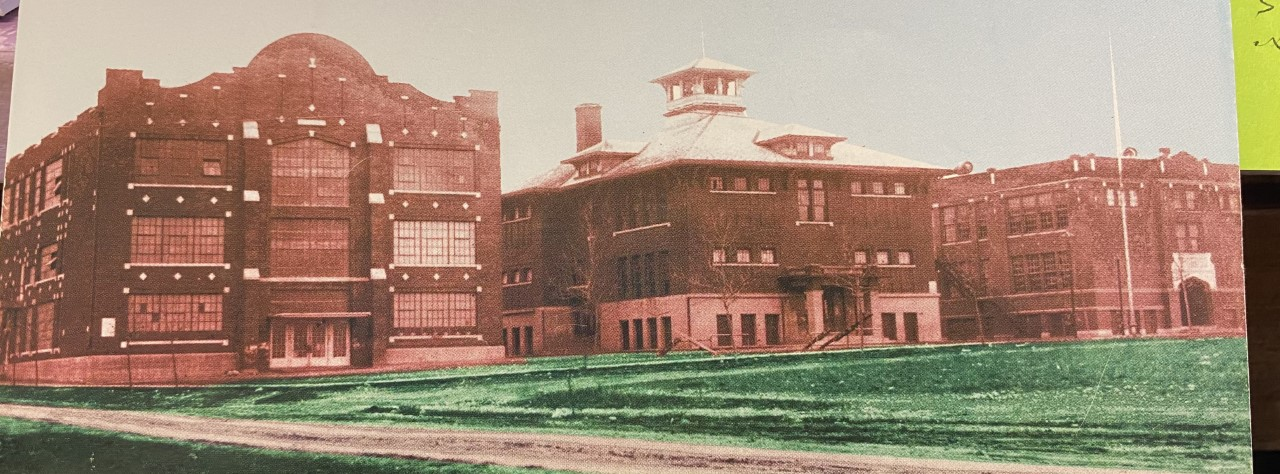

In 2006, it was placed 95th on Newsweek magazine's top 1200 high schools list. In 2021, the men's soccer team went to state for the first time in history. Students also participate in tennis, cross country, football, golf, softball, baseball, track, and powerlifting.

== Feeder patterns ==
Elementary schools that feed into Diamond Hill-Jarvis include Diamond Hill Elementary, Cesar Chavez Elementary, H.V. Helbing Elementary, and M.H. Moore Elementary.

W.A. Meacham Middle School feeds into Diamond Hill-Jarvis.
