= Lamont Mack =

American basketball player

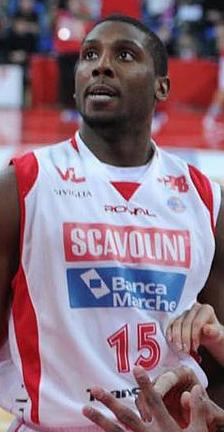
- Mack playing for Scavolini Pesaro in 2013

Personal information
- Born: March 16, 1987 (age 39) Chicago, Illinois
- Listed height: 6 ft 7 in (2.01 m)
- Listed weight: 230 lb (104 kg)

Career information
- High school: Highland Park (Saint Paul, Minnesota); Tartan (Saint Paul, Minnesota)
- College: Angelina (2005–2007); Charlotte (2007–2009)
- NBA draft: 2009: undrafted
- Playing career: 2009–2018
- Position: Small forward

Career history
- 2009–2011: AEK Athens
- 2011–2012: Lukoil Academic
- 2012–2013: Scavolini Pesaro
- 2013: s.Oliver Baskets
- 2014: Korihait
- 2014: Valladolid
- 2014: Club La Unión
- 2015: Gigantes del Estado de México
- 2015–2016: CS Energia Rovinari
- 2016: STB Le Havre
- 2016: Karpoš Sokoli
- 2016: Hoops Club
- 2017: Iowa Wolves
- 2018: Dinamo Tbilisi

Career highlights
- Bulgarian Cup winner (2012)

Lamont Mack (born March 16, 1987) is an American professional basketball player who last played for the Dinamo Tbilisi.

== College career ==
At Angelina College in Lufkin, Texas, he was a Junior College all-American and ranked as the 21st best player in junior college. Mack played for the Charlotte 49ers while studying a criminal justice major from 2007 to 2009. In his first season, he had an average of 15.6 points per game, improving greatly in the second half of the season to become a "bona fide scorer". He is a fan of the Chicago Bulls and Chicago White Sox and would have played baseball had he not made a career in basketball. He cites his grandmother, Nelgie Jordan, as his greatest influence.

== Professional career ==
Mack joined the Greek League team AEK Athens in 2009, and in January 2011, he signed with PBC Lukoil Academic in Bulgaria. He spent the 2012–13 season with Scavolini Pesaro in Italy, then in July 2013, he signed with s.Oliver Baskets of the German Basketball Bundesliga. He parted ways with them in December 2013.

In February 2014, he signed with Korihait of Finland, leaving a month later to sign with CB Valladolid in Spain.

In August 2014, Mack signed with Club La Unión in Argentina. In October 2014, he parted ways with La Unión. On January 9, 2015, he signed with Gigantes Edomex Toluca of the Mexican LNBP. He left Gigantes after only four games. On February 27, 2015, he signed with CS Energia Rovinari of the Romanian Liga Națională for the rest of the season. On August 24, 2015, he re-signed with Energia. On February 23, 2016, he left Energia and signed with STB Le Havre of France for the rest of the 2015–16 LNB Pro A season.

On September 6, 2016, Mack signed with Macedonian club Karpoš Sokoli for the 2016–17 season. On October 9, 2016, he parted ways with Karpoš Sokoli after appearing in only three games. On October 19, 2016, he signed with Hoops Club of the Lebanese Basketball League.

On September 5, 2017, Mack signed with Timba Timișoara, but he did not pass a medical test. In October 2017, he joined the Iowa Wolves in the NBA G League.
