= Benbrook Middle-High School =

High school in Texas, United States

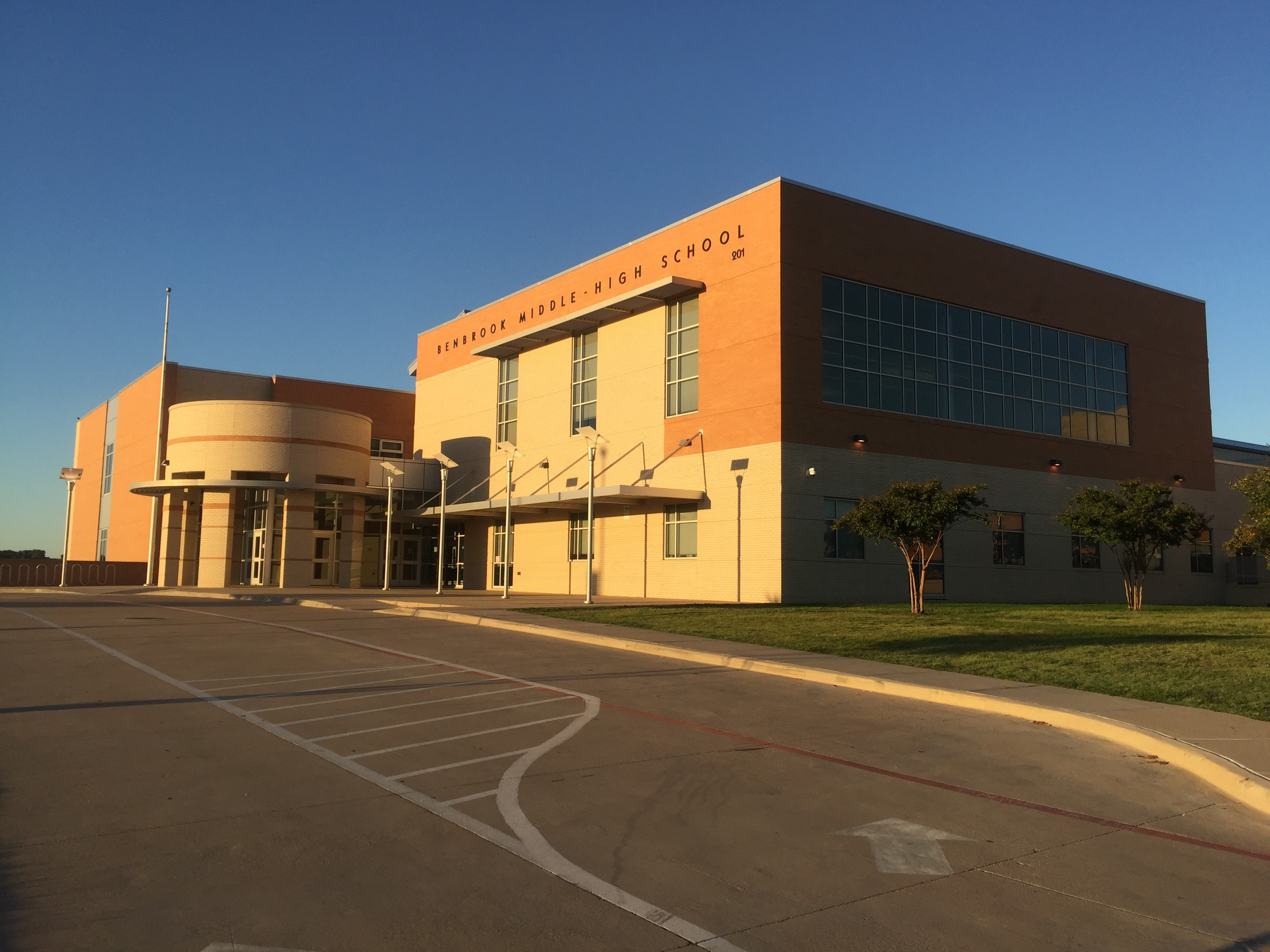

Location
- 201 Overcrest; Fort Worth, Texas 76126; United States; 32°39′52″N 97°29′09″W

Information
- Type: Public secondary school
- School district: Fort Worth Independent School District
- Principal: Dr. Jason Oliver
- Teaching staff: 92.55 (on an FTE basis)
- Grades: 6-12
- Enrollment: 1,490 (2023-24)
- Student to teacher ratio: 16,10
- Colors: Green, gold, and black
- Nickname: Bobcats
- Website: www.fwisd.org/benbrook

Benbrook Middle-High School (BMHS) is a combined middle and high school in Benbrook, Texas, in the Dallas-Fort Worth metroplex. It is within the Fort Worth Independent School District. It is southeast of Westpark Elementary School and situated in a 175,600-square-foot (16,310 m^{2}) building on a 31-acre (13 ha) plot of land.

== History ==
In 2007 there were plans to build a second middle school in Benbrook, and FWISD offered a bond referendum in which people could facilitate having the school built, something Jerry Dittrich, the mayor of Benrbook, advocated. Pamela Brandenberg, who had once been a member of the city council of Benbrook, stated in 2007 that at the time, many families were moving to other cities because they perceived the existing school facilities in Benbrook to be inadequate, and that many people in Benbrook had a positive reception to that city having its own middle school. James Schull, a then-current member of the city council, stated that if the district would show commitment to having the middle school built, he would support the bond.

The bond was passed, and construction began in 2010. The opening of Benbrook Middle relieved nearby middle schools; this allowed FWISD to establish a plan to move an alternative school, Middle Level Learning Center, onto the Leonard 6th Grade Center property, which in turn allowed the Texas Academy of Biomedical Sciences to occupy the ex-alternative school campus. Members of the board of education were to vote on the plan.

The facility opened as Benbrook Middle School in August 2011; a 2007 bond was paid for the $39 million facility.

In 2013 there were plans to add a high school component, which Dittrich stated had a favorable reception among Benbrook residents.

In 2014 the 9th-grade class began operation and the school became a mixed middle and high school; this was the result of a 2013 ballot measure within the FWISD bond.

== Demographics ==
The demographic breakdown of the 1,532 students enrolled for the 2021-22 school year was as follows:

- Male - 53.0%
- Female - 47.0%
- American Indian/Native Alaskan - 0.4%
- Asian - 1.3%
- Black - 7.1%
- Hispanic - 38.2%
- Native Hawaiian/Pacific islanders - 0.1%
- White - 49.7%
- Multiracial - 3.2%

51.6% of the students were eligible for free or reduced cost lunch. For the school year 2021-22, Benbrook was a Title I school.
