= Fort Worth Independent School District =

School district in Texas

Coordinates: 32.7214°N 97.4378°W

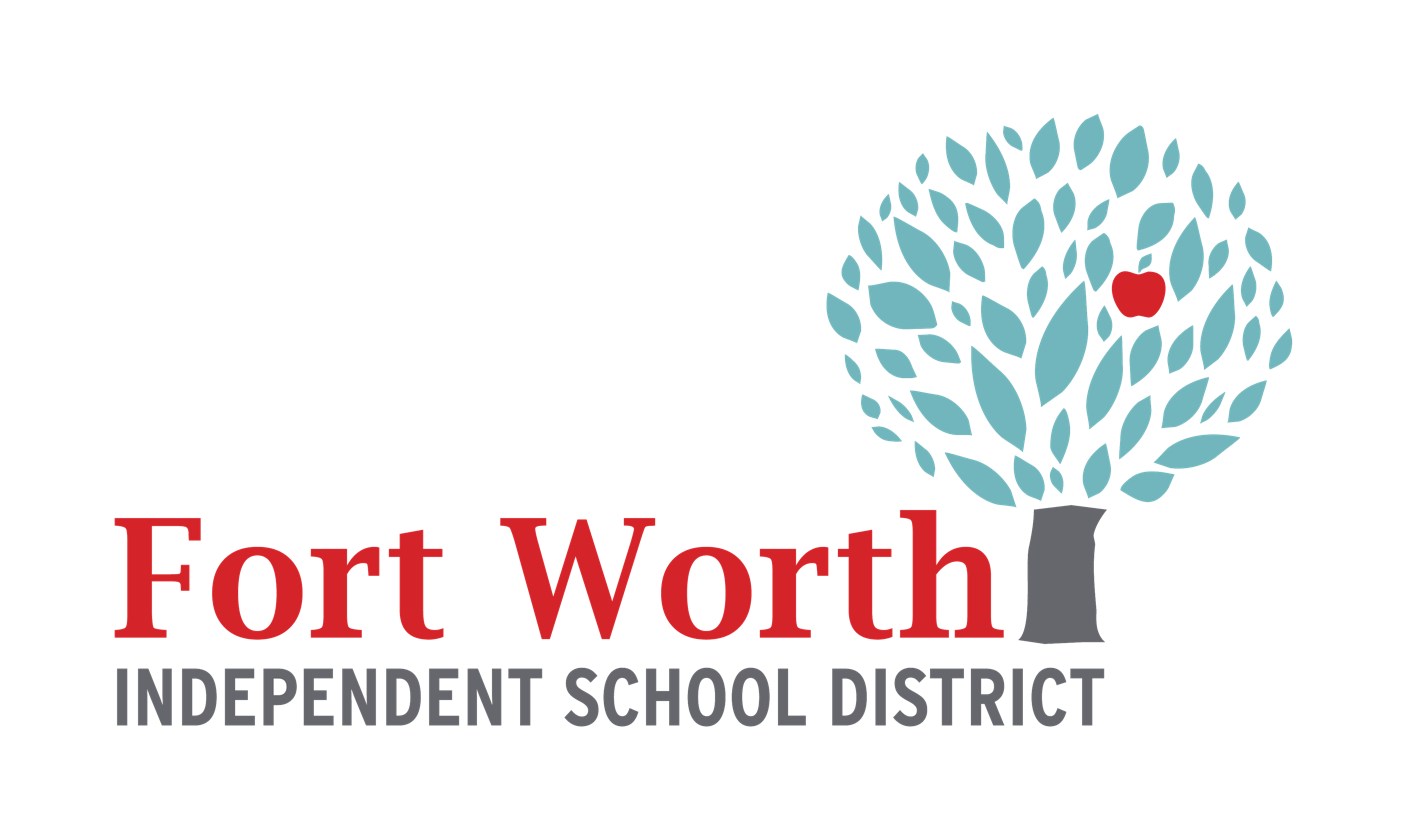

Location
- Fort Worth, surrounding areas Tarrant, Texas; United States

District information
- Type: Public
- Grades: Pre K-12
- Established: 1925
- Superintendent: Peter Licata
- Schools: 134
- Budget: $869.73 million

Students and staff
- Students: 67,315 (2025-26)
- Teachers: 4,937.6 (on an FTE basis) (2025-26)
- Staff: 9,768.7 (on an FTE basis) (2024-25)

Other information
- Website: fwisd.org

Fort Worth Independent School District is a school district based in Fort Worth, Texas, United States. Based on a 2025-26 enrollment of 67,491 students, it is the tenth largest school district in Texas.

Fort Worth ISD serves most of the city of Fort Worth, as well as the cities of Benbrook, Westover Hills, and Westworth Village. The district also covers portions of Arlington, Edgecliff Village, Forest Hill, Haltom City, Kennedale, Sansom Park, White Settlement, and unincorporated portions of Tarrant County.

In 2010, the district unveiled one of the largest, most comprehensive redesigns of secondary education in the nation with its Gold Seal Programs of Choice and Gold Seal Schools. Each of its 13 high schools introduced curricula focused on college and career pathways. As part of the Gold Seal plan, the district has also opened a single-gender school for girls, the Young Women's Leadership Academy; a single-gender school for boys, the Young Men's Leadership Academy Paul Laurence Dunbar Young Men's Leadership Academy; an early college high school, Marine Creek Collegiate High School; and an early college medical high school, the Texas Academy of Biomedical Sciences.

In 2018, the school district was given an overall grade of "C" by the Texas Education Agency.

== History ==
Superintendent Walter Dansby, who started his FWISD career circa 1974, began his term in 2012. His base salary was $338,817.60. He resigned on Monday June 2, 2014,; the following day the district announced his severance pay, to be doled out over a seven month period, would be over $900,000. His final day of work was January 31, 2015.

In 2019 the district planned a major redraw of attendance boundaries, the first since circa 1999. In 2020 the FWISD board of education accepted proposed changes. Parents upset with some of the changes considered filing lawsuits to stop the changes.

== Salary ==
Teacher salaries in the FWISD are above the state average and significantly higher than the minimum teacher salary schedule in Texas. For the 2018-19 school year, the salary for new teachers with a Bachelor's degree in FWISD averaged $53,000 with no experience. The 2018-19 average salary for teachers with 30 years experience is $70,000. Teachers with a Master's degree or higher and the same years of experience averaged $1,000-$1,500 more per year.

== Texas Education Agency takeover ==
In October 2025, Texas Education Agency (TEA) Commissioner Mike Morath ordered the appointment of a new board of managers and a conservator to oversee the Fort Worth Independent School District, according to a letter sent to Superintendent Karen Molinar. The decision followed an analysis of district data and a review of district systems and student academic performance. The intervention followed five consecutive years of failing academic ratings at the Leadership Academy of Forest Oak, which FWISD subsequently closed. State law required action despite the closure of the campus. Eight other district campuses had also received unacceptable academic ratings for three consecutive years. During 2024–2025, the number of F-rated campuses in the district decreased from 31 to 11. Superintendent Karen Molinar stated that the district needed to continue addressing the number of failing campuses. Morath acknowledged the district's recent improvements, but stated that the number of chronically underperforming schools was increasing. FWISD Board President Roxanne Martinez stated that the existing board was capable of meeting the expectations outlined by Morath and that the district had already made measurable progress. Morath stated that the district had the option to appeal this decision, and that the TEA would not implement changes to the district's governance until the appeals process concluded.

On November 6, 2025, a letter to Superintendent Karen Molinar from Commissioner Mike Morath announced his intention to replace the board of trustees with a board of managers and install a new superintendent. Morath also announced the appointment of former New Mexico Secretary of Education Christopher Ruszkowski as conservator. Ruszkowski was tasked with monitoring the district's operations and overseeing efforts to improve academic performance while the TEA continued the process of appointing the district's new leadership.

On February 5, 2026, a state administrative court ruled in favor of the Texas Education Agency's decision to initiate a state takeover of the Fort Worth Independent School District. FWISD Board President Roxanne Martinez criticized the ruling, stating that the panel failed to adequately consider the district's recent progress or the views of families and voters in the district. District trustees stated that they remained focused on student safety and would continue working with district staff and teachers to facilitate the transition. The state-appointed leadership retains governance over the district until Morath determines the district has achieved sufficient academic improvement to be returned to local control, a process that typically takes two years.

On March 24, 2026, TEA Commissioner Mike Morath appointed nine members to a new board of managers. Morath also appointed Peter B. Licata as the new Superintendent of FWISD, replacing Karen Molinar in the role. The timing of the appointment of Licata as superintendent drew criticism from State Board of Education member Tiffany Clark, who called the appointment of Licata "a distraction for students before state testing begins." State Senator Taylor Rehmet echoed Clark's concerns; however, he stated he looked forward to working with Licata and the new board.

On April 28, 2026, the newly appointed board of managers voted unanimously to reduce staffing and close the International Newcomer Academy. The board also voted to accelerate the closure timeline for De Zavala Elementary School, and eliminate 32 positions districtwide following a restructuring recommendation by Superintendent Licata. Five additional schools that the elected board of trustees voted to close ceased operations at the end of the 2025-26 school year.

== Schools ==
=== Schools of choice and magnet schools ===
- Alice Carlson Applied Learning Center (Grades K-5)
- Daggett Montessori School (Grades K-8)
- I.M. Terrell Academy for STEM & VPA (Grades 9-12)
- Marine Creek Collegiate High School (Grades 9-12)
- TCC South/FWISD Collegiate High School (Grades 9-12)
- Texas Academy of Biomedical Sciences (TABS) (Grades 9-12)
- Trimble Tech High School (Grades 9-12)
- World Languages Institute (Grades 9-12)
- Young Men's Leadership Academy (Grades 6-12)
- Young Women's Leadership Academy (Grades 6-12)

=== Secondary Schools ===
==== High Schools (Grades 9-12) ====
- Amon Carter Riverside High School (1936)
- Arlington Heights High School (1920)
- Benbrook Middle-High School (2011)
- Diamond Hill-Jarvis High School (1903)
- Paul Laurence Dunbar High School (1953)
- Eastern Hills High School (1959)
- North Side High School (1884)
- R. L. Paschal High School (1885)
- Polytechnic High School (1907)
- South Hills High School (1998)
- Southwest High School (1967)
- Trimble Tech High School (1955)
- Western Hills High School (1968)
- O. D. Wyatt High School (1968)

==== Middle Schools (Grades 6-8) ====
- Benbrook Middle-High School
- Daggett Middle School
- J. P. Elder Middle School
- Leadership Academy at Forest Oak Middle School
- J. Martin Jacquet Middle School
- William James Middle School
- Kirkpatrick Middle School
- Leonard Middle School
  - When the school opened, it was accessible exclusively via Chapin Road.
- Jean McClung Middle School
- W. P. McLean Middle School (Grades 7-8)
- McLean 6th Grade
- W. A. Meacham Middle School
- Meadowbrook Middle School
- William Monnig Middle School
- Morningside Middle School
- Riverside Middle School
- Rosemont Middle School
- W. C. Stripling Middle School
- Wedgwood Middle School

==== Other Schools ====
- Boulevard Heights
- Como Success Academy
- Horizons Alternative School (Program)
- Juvenile Justice Alternative Education Program (JJAEP)
- Jo Kelly School
- Lena Pope Home (Program)
- Metro Opportunity School

==== Elementary schools ====
- Harlean Beal Elementary School
- Benbrook Elementary School
- Bonnie Brae Elementary School
- Burton Hill Elementary School
- Carter Park Elementary School
- George C. Clarke Elementary School
- Lily B. Clayton Elementary School
- Leadership Academy at Como Elementary School
- Alice D. Contreras Elementary School
- E. M. Daggett Elementary School
- Clifford Davis Elementary School
- Diamond Hill Elementary School
- East Handley Elementary School
- Eastern Hills-West Handley Elementary School
- Bill J. Elliott Elementary School
- Esperanza Elementary School
- Glen Park Elementary School
  - Named a National Blue Ribbon School in 2004.
- W. M. Green Elementary School
- Greenbriar Elementary School
- H. V. Helbing Elementary School
- Natha Howell Elementary School
- Hubbard Heights Elementary School
- Dolores Huerta Elementary School
- Manuel Jara Elementary School
- Leadership Academy at Maude I. Logan Elementary School
- Lowery Road Elementary School
- Atwood McDonald Elementary School
- D. McRae Elementary School
- Meadowbrook Elementary School
- Rufino Mendoza Elementary School
  - Named a National Blue Ribbon School in 2003.
- Luella Merrett Elementary School
- Leadership Academy at Mitchell Boulevard Elementary School
  - In 2018 the district designated the school as a "leadership academy" to address historically low standardized test scores.
- M. H. Moore Elementary School
- Morningside Elementary School
- Christene C. Moss Elementary School
- North Hi Mount Elementary School
- Oakhurst Elementary School
- Oaklawn Elementary School
- Overton Park Elementary School
- A. M. Pate Elementary School
- Hazel Harvey Peace Elementary School
- Carrol Peak Elementary School
- Mary Louise Phillips Elementary School
- Ridglea Hills Elementary School
- Rolling Hills Elementary School
- Sam Rosen Elementary School
- Sagamore Hill Elementary School
- David K. Sellars Elementary School
- Seminary Hills Park Elementary School
- Bruce Shulkey Elementary School
- T. A. Sims Elementary School
- South Hi Mount Elementary School
- South Hills Elementary School
- Springdale Elementary School
- J. T. Stevens Elementary School
- Sunrise-McMillan Elementary School
- Tanglewood Elementary School
  - Named a National Blue Ribbon School in 1991-1992.
- W. J. Turner Elementary School
- Van Zandt-Guinn Elementary School
- Maudrie M. Walton Elementary School
- Washington Heights Elementary School
- Waverly Park Elementary School
- Westcliff Elementary School
- Westcreek Elementary School
- Western Hills Elementary School
- Westpark Elementary School
- Leadership Academy at John T. White Elementary School
- Versia L. Williams Elementary School
- Richard J. Wilson Elementary School
- Woodway Elementary School
- Worth Heights Elementary School

== Defunct schools ==
=== Elementary schools ===
- Western Hills Primary School - Consolidated into Western Hills Elementary School in June 2026.
- De Zavala Elementary School - Closed in June 2026; students reassigned to Lily B. Clayton Elementary School or E. M. Daggett Elementary School.
- Charles E. Nash Elementary School - Closed in June 2026; students reassigned to Rufino Mendoza Elementary School, Oakhurst Elementary School, and Versia L. Williams Elementary School.
- Riverside Applied Learning Center - School of choice closed in June 2026; students reassigned to Bonnie Brae Elementary School.
- Edward J. Briscoe Elementary School - Closed in June 2026; students reassigned to Carroll Peak Elementary School, Morningside Elementary School, and Van Zandt-Guinn Elementary School.
- Milton L. Kirkpatrick Elementary School - Closed in June 2026; students reassigned to Washington Heights Elementary School and Dolores Huerta Elementary School.

=== Other Schools ===
- International Newcomer Academy - Specialized public alternative school closed in May 2026.

== See also ==
- List of school districts in Texas
