= Bishop Martin High School =

Coordinates: 18°5′49.92″N 88°34′25.48″W

- 3/4 Mile San Lorenzo Road; Orange Walk Town; Belize

Information
- Type: Public
- Motto: Developing Young Lives for the World and Beyond.
- Religious affiliation: Catholic
- Established: 2002
- Principal: Angel Leiva
- Classes: 13
- Campus: Urban area
- Campus size: 13.5 acres (5.5 ha)
- Colours: Red and gold
- Website: www.bmhsow.edu.bz

Bishop Martin High School (BMHS) is a diocesan Roman Catholic high school located in Orange Walk Town, Belize.

== History ==
BMHS was established on September 2, 2002, by the Roman Catholic Diocese of Belize City-Belmopan, under Bishop Osmond P. Martin. It opened with 60 first form students and Mr. René Constanza as the principal. It moved to the present location on San Lorenzo Road in 2004. In 2018-19 it had an enrollment of 385 students, with Mr. Luis Pook as principal and Mrs. Luisa Gillett vice-principal.

== Academics ==
Students in first and second form (9th and 10th grade in the United States) all have the same curriculum but there are alternate programs in third and fourth forms. The focus of most of the subjects at third and fourth form is preparation for CSEC exams, as is the case in most Belizean high schools.

Education at BMHS is also focused on Catholic faith and values. The calendar includes activities connected to the Church's liturgical year, including an emphasis on mission education – preparing students for today's world but also with a faith in life beyond this world. The school's patron saint is San Juan Diego, canonized by John Paul II in 2002.

== Student life ==
A special characteristic of the school is its involvement of parents through service hours and also in disciplinary matters. From participation in intramurals to involvement in fundraising activities, the whole school community is involved. The Head of Discipline is in overall charge of disciplinary matters and uses reflection on student behavior and one-on-one counselling, besides involving the parents in the disciplinary process.

== Past principals of BMHS ==
- 2002-06 Father René Constanza, CSP
- 2006-08 Mrs. Maria Johnston
- 2008-10 Mrs. Flavia Burgos
- 2010-19 Mr. Luis Pook
