= F. W. Woolworth Building (Fort Worth, Texas) =

- F.W. Woolworth Building
- U.S. National Register of Historic Places
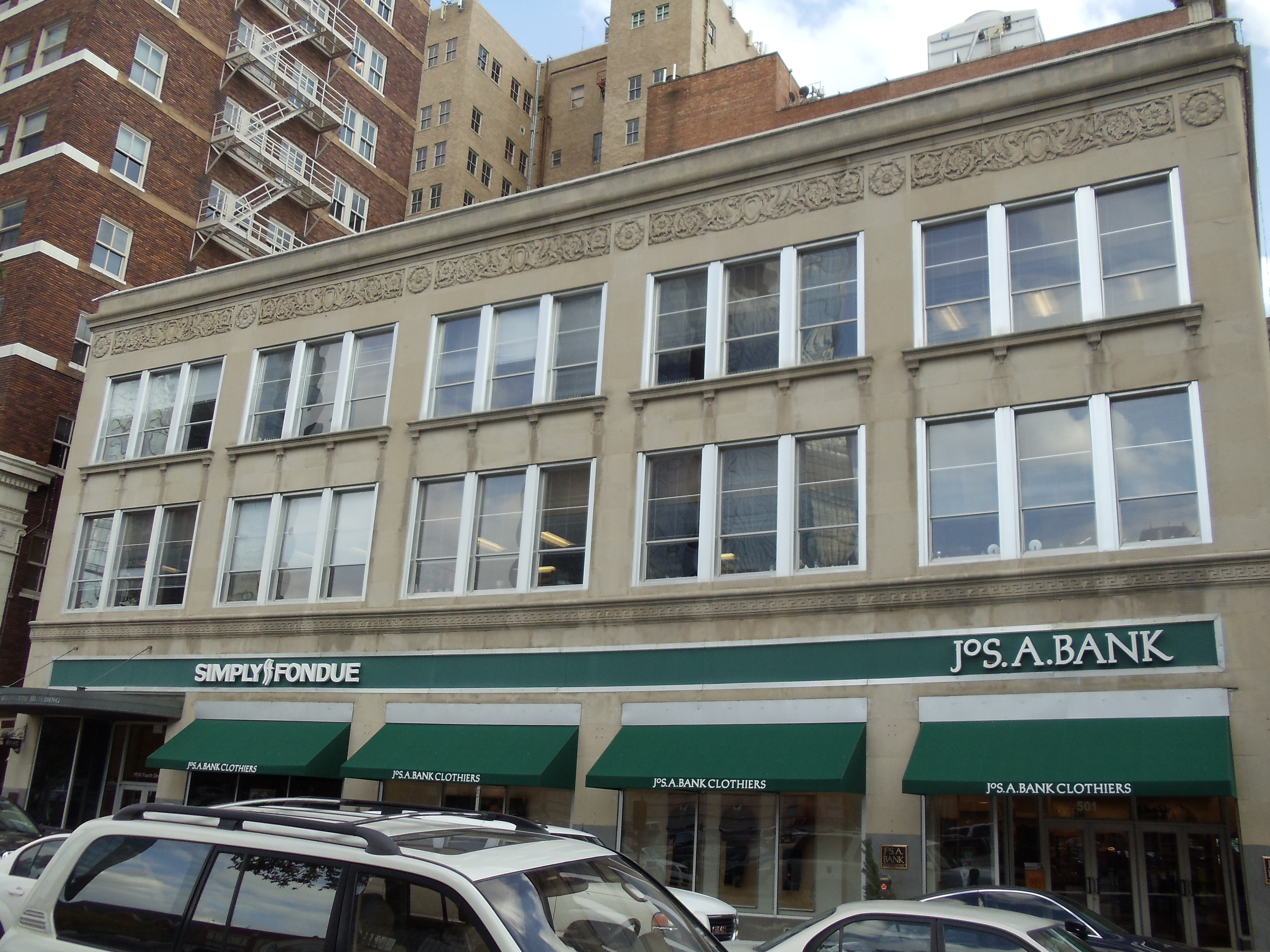
- Woolworth Building in 2011

- Location within Texas Location within the United States
- Location: 501 Houston St., Fort Worth, Texas
- Coordinates: 32°45′12″N 97°19′52″W
- Area: less than one acre
- Built: 1925
- Architect: Wiley G. Clarkson, James T. Taylor
- Architectural style: Classical Revival
- NRHP reference No.: 94001359
- Added to NRHP: November 25, 1994

The F.W. Woolworth Building is a historic department store building located in Sundance Square section of downtown Fort Worth, Texas. The building served as a retail location for the F. W. Woolworth Company from 1926 to 1990. It now houses other tenants including a JoS. A. Bank Clothiers store.

Designed by Wiley G. Clarkson and James T. Taylor to be ten stories tall, the limestone and concrete structure was only built as a three-story building. The Classical Revival building includes an elaborate frieze. The building was added to the National Register of Historic Places in 1994.

== See also ==
- List of Woolworth buildings
- National Register of Historic Places listings in Tarrant County, Texas
