= Wiley G. Clarkson =

American architect

- Born: Wiley Gulick Clarkson; November 28, 1885; Corsicana, Texas
- Died: May 5, 1952 (aged 66)
- Occupation: Architect

Wiley Gulick Clarkson (November 28, 1885 – May 5, 1952) was an American architect who was active in Texas.

== Biography ==
Clarkson was born on November 28, 1885, in Corsicana, Texas. He received his architectural training at the School of the Art Institute of Chicago. After practicing for a few years in Corsicana, Clarkson set up shop in 1912 in Fort Worth. He would remain one of the most prominent architects in Cowtown through the 1950s, where his Classical, Gothic, Italianate, and Beaux Arts buildings still stand.

== Family ==
Wiley Clarkson's grandson Clay Clarkson, along with Clay's wife Sally Clarkson, are both Christian ministry leaders.

== Notable buildings ==
- Texas Christian University Library, Fort Worth, Texas
- Trinity Episcopal Church, Fort Worth, Texas
- Sanger Brothers Department Store, Fort Worth, Texas
- Young Men's Christian Association Building, Fort Worth, Texas
- Woolworth Building, Fort Worth, Texas
- First Methodist Church, Fort Worth, Texas
- W.I. Cook Memorial Children's Hospital, Fort Worth, Texas
- Collins Art Company, Fort Worth, Texas
- Fort Worth Masonic Temple, Fort Worth, Texas
- Hancock Paint Store, Fort Worth, Texas
- North Side Senior High School, Fort Worth, Texas
- Shelton Building (McCrory's Variety Store), Fort Worth, Texas
- Sinclair Building, Fort Worth, Texas
- Tarrant County Building and Loan Association Building, Fort Worth, Texas
- W.C. Stripling Department Store, Fort Worth, Texas
- Municipal Airport Administration Building, Fort Worth, Texas
- United States Courthouse, Fort Worth, Texas
- Fort Worth Art Center (now Modern Art Museum of Fort Worth), Fort Worth, Texas
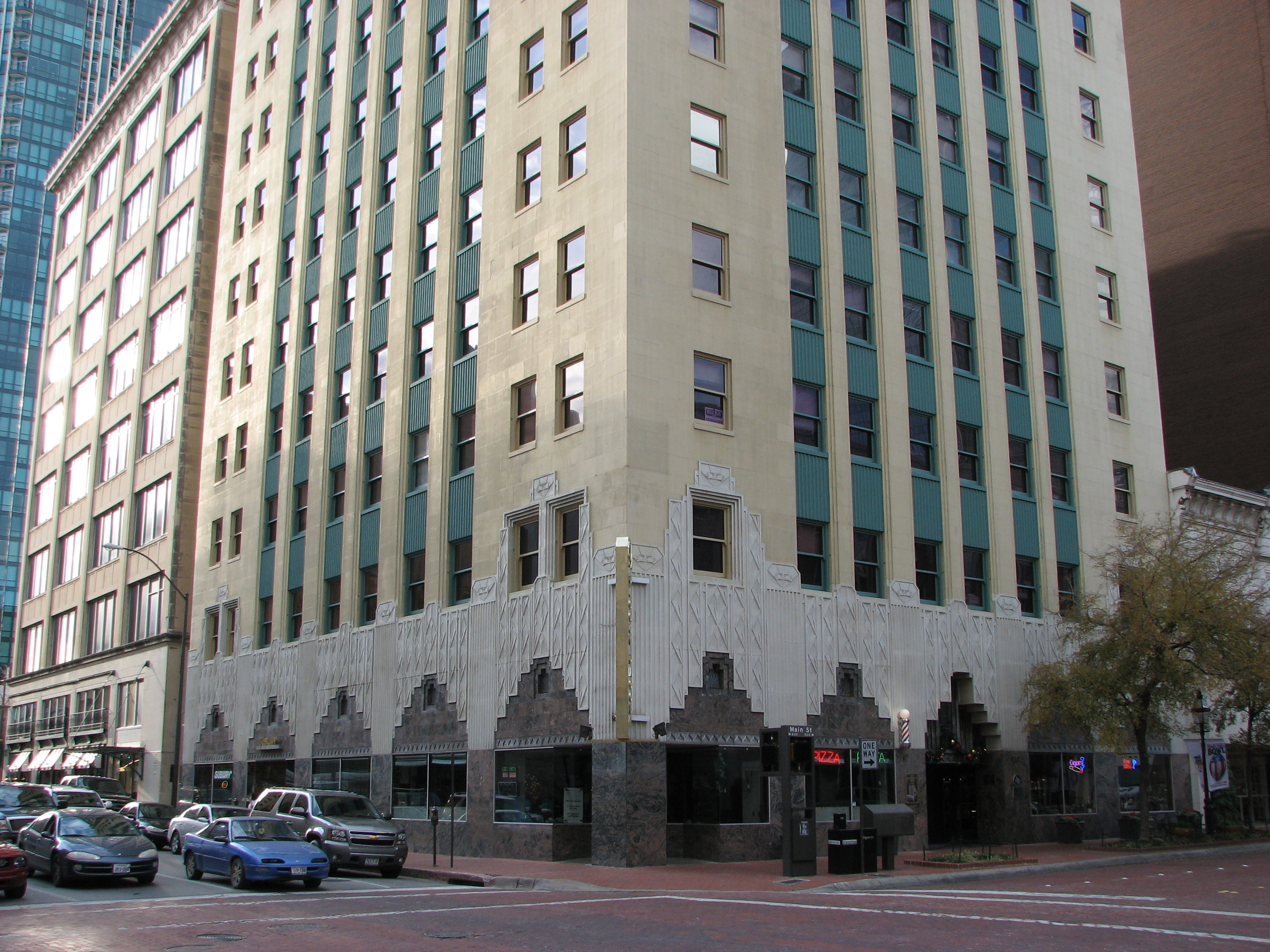
Sinclair Building in downtown Fort Worth

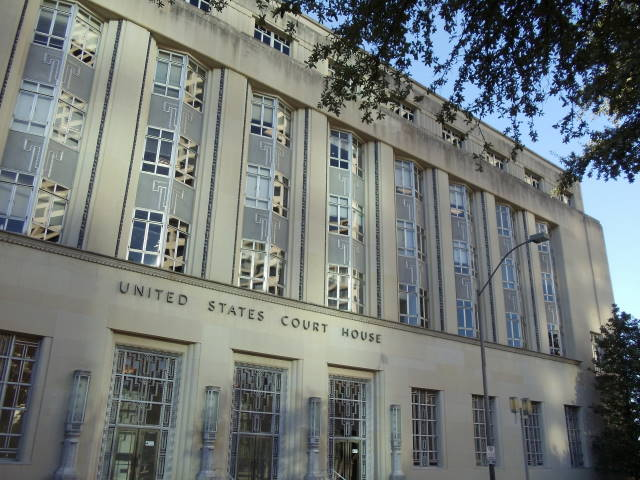
Eldon B. Mahon United States Courthouse

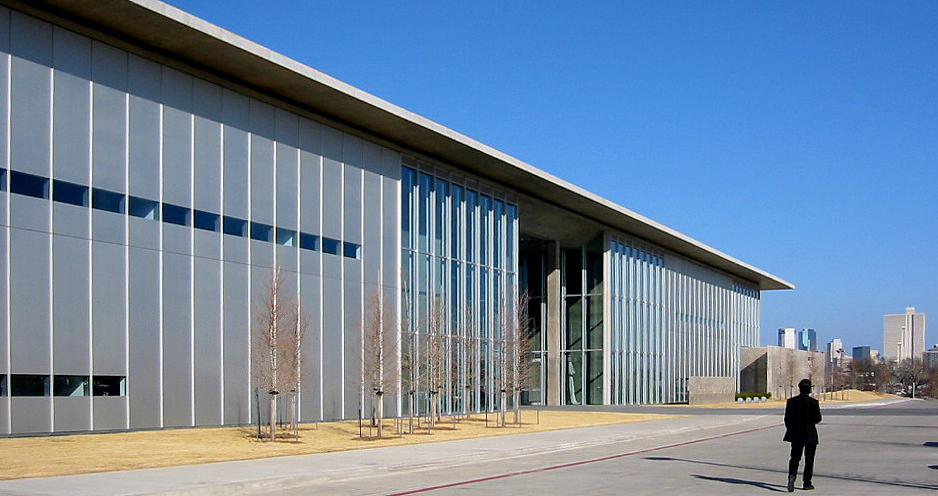
Modern Art Museum of Fort Worth

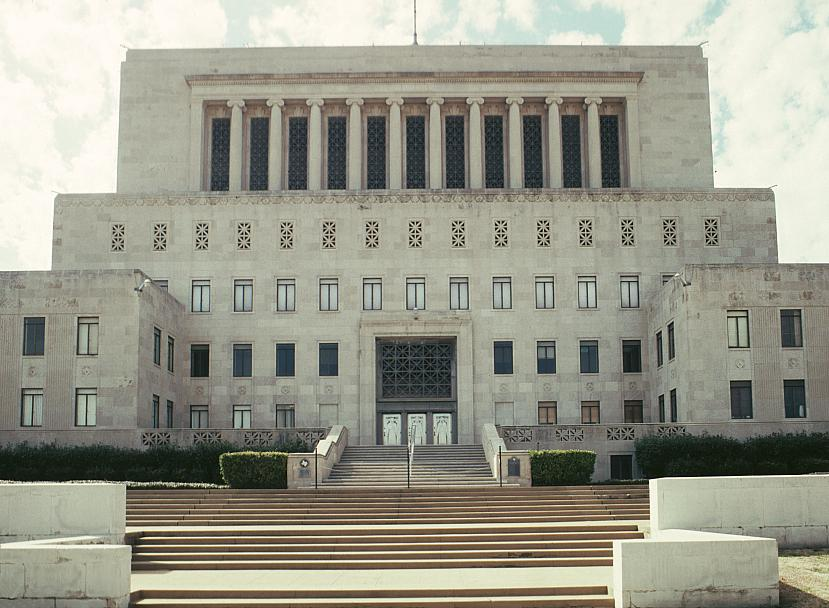
Fort Worth Masonic Temple
