= List of Alfred C. Finn works =

This is a list of the works of the architect Alfred C. Finn.

== Chronological list ==
Name	City	Address	Year	NRHP-listed?	Status	Type of Work	Notes
Great Jones Building	Houston	708 Main Street	1908				Attributed to Sanguinet & Staats, with possible assistance from Finn
A. S. Cleveland House	Houston	8 Courtlandt Place	1911	Yes		Architect	With Sanguinet & Staats
James L. Autry House, Courtlandt Place	Houston	5 Courtlandt Place	1912	Yes		Architect	With Sanguinet & Staats
Link-Lee House	Houston	3800 Montrose	1912	Yes	St. Thomas University campus	Architect	With Sanguinet & Staats
Rice Hotel	Houston	790 Texas Avenue	1913	Yes	Post Lofts	Supervising Architect	Designed by Mauran, Russell & Crowell.
Foster Building	Houston	801 Texas Avenue	1914		Demolished 2017	Designing Architect	AKA, The Houston Chronicle Building
Rusk Building	Houston	Texas and Travis	1916		Demolished 2017	Designing Architect	Later annexed to the Houston Chronicle Building
Sterling-Berry House	Houston	4515 Yoakum Boulevard	1916	Yes		Architect	Portico added in 1919
Henry H. Dickson House	Houston	3614 Montrose	1917			Architect	
Humble Gas Station	Houston	Main Street at Jefferson	1918			Architect	
Woodward House	Houston	1605 Heights Boulevard	1918	yes		Architect	
Jones-Hunt House	Houston	24 Courtlandt Place	1920	Yes		Architect	
Earl K. Wharton House	Houston	12 Remington Lane	1920			Architect	
Sid Westheimer House	Houston	Montrose	1920	Yes		Architect	
L.A. and Adelheid Machemehl House	Bellville, Texas		1920	Yes		Architect	
International & Great Northern Hospital	Palestine, Texas	919 S. Magnolia	1922			Architect	
Melba Theatre	Dallas	1913 Elm	1922		Demolished 1971	Designing Architect	Built for John T. and Jesse H. Jones
Walter Fondren House	Houston	3410 Montrose	1922			Designing Architect	
State National Bank Building (Houston, Texas)	Houston	412 Main	1923	yes		Designing Architect	
Houston Light Guard Armory	Houston		1925		Houston Buffalo Soldiers Museum	Designing Architect	
Simon Theatre	Brenham, Texas		1925			Designing Architect	Part of the Brenham Downtown Historic District, NRHP-listed district
Hermann Hospital	Houston	Texas Medical Center	1925			Associate Architect	
Lamar Hotel	Houston		1926		Demolished	Designing Architect	
Metropolitan Theater	Houston	1018 Main Street	1926		Demolished 1973	Supervising Architect	Designed by Jordan MacKenzie
Coca-Cola Bottling Plant	Houston	707 Live Oak Street	1926		Demolished 2007		
Loew's State Theater	Houston	1022 Main Street	1927		Demolished 1973	Supervising Architect	Designed by Victor E. Johnson
Kirby Building	Houston		1927			Designing Architect	
Ross S. Sterling House	Bay Ridge, Texas		1928			Designing Architect	
The Smart Shop	Houston	905 Main Street	1928				
Sam Houston Hall	Houston	801 Bagby	1928		Demolished in 1936	Architect	With Kenneth Franzheim. Replaced by the Sam Houston Coliseum. Now the site of the Hobby Center for the Performing Arts.
Worth Hotel and Worth Theater	Fort Worth, Texas		1928			Designing Architect	With Wyatt C. Hedrick
Scottish Rite Cathedral (Galveston, Texas)	Galveston	2128 Church Street	1929	Yes			
Krupp and Tuffly Building	Houston	901 Main Street	1929				
Gulf Building	Houston	712 Main Street	1929	Yes		Designer	With Kenneth Franzheim and J.E.R. Carpenter. Tallest building in Houston from 1929 to 1963. NRHP-listed.
William Lewis Moody III House	Galveston	16 South Cedar Lawn	1929			Managing office	Design credit to Robert C. Smallwood. Contributing property to the Cedar Lawn Historic District (NRHP-listed)
St. Paul's United Methodist Church	Houston	Main St.	1930			Designing architect	
Forest Hill Abbey mausoleum	Kansas City, Missouri		1931			Designing Architect	
People's National Bank Building	Tyler, Texas	102 N. College Avenue	1932	Yes		Designing Architect	
Jefferson Davis Hospital	Houston	1801 Allen Parkway	1937		Demolished 1999	Designer	With Joseph Finger
Sam Houston Coliseum and Houston Music Hall	Houston	801 Bagby St	1937		Demolished 1998	Architect	
Galveston US Post Office, Custom House and Courthouse	Galveston	601 25th Street	1937	Yes			NRHP-listed in 2001
San Jacinto Monument	La Porte	1 Monument Circle	1938				Located at the Battle of San Jacinto Battlefield National Historic Landmark District
Texas A&M University dormitory complex	College Station, Texas		1940			Designing Architect	
U.S. Naval Hospital	Houston		1945		Demolished	Designing Architect	Also used as a Veterans Administration Hospital
City National Bank Building	Houston	921 Main street	1946-47	Yes			Or located at 1001 McKinney Ave. NRHP-listed in 2000.
First National Bank of Goose Creek	Baytown	300 West Texas Avenue	1948				
Ezekiel W. Cullen Building	Houston	University of Houston	1950				University of Houston administration building; performance hall
Sakowitz Bros. Department Store	Houston	1111 Main Street	1951				
Arabia Temple Crippled Children's Hospital	Houston		1952			Designing Architect	Texas Medical Center
First National Bank building	Longview, Texas		1956			Designing Architect	
Ben Taub Hospital	Houston		1963			Designing Architect	With C. A. Johnson and H. E. Maddox.

== Bibliography ==
- Beasley, Ellen; Fox, Stephen (1996). Galveston Architectural Guidebook. Houston: Rice University Press. ISBN 978-0892633463.
- Bradley, Barrie Scardino (2020). Improbable Metropolis: Houston's Architectural and Urban History. Austin: University of Texas Press. ISBN 978-1477320198.
- Fenberg, Stephen (2011). Unprecedented Power: Jesse Jones, Capitalism, and the Common Good. College Station: Texas A&M University Press.
- Fox, Stephen (2012). AIA Houston Architectural Guide (Third ed.). Houston: American Institute of Architects, Houston Chapter. ISBN 978-0-615-66959-5.
- Henry, Jay C. (2009). Architecture in Texas, 1895−1945. Austin: University of Texas Press.
- Strom, Steven R. (2010). Houston: Lost and Unbuilt. Austin: University of Texas Press.
- Welling, David (2007). Cinema Houston: From Nickelodeon to Cineplex. Austin: University of Texas Press.
