= Plaza Tower =

Plaza Tower, or The Plaza Tower, may refer to:

- Plaza Tower (New Orleans)
- Plaza Tower (Tyler, Texas)
- Plaza Tower (Knoxville, Tennessee), in Downtown Knoxville
- Plaza Towers in Grand Rapids, Michigan
- Plaza Towers East in Iowa City, Iowa
- Plaza Towers Elementary School in Moore, Oklahoma
- The Plaza Tower (Leeds, England), or Sky Plaza

== See also ==
- Century Plaza Towers in Century City, Los Angeles, California
- Lusail Plaza Towers in Lusail, Qatar
- Madou Plaza Tower in Brussels, Belgium
- Pacific Plaza Towers in Metro Manila, Philippines
- Professional Plaza Tower in Detroit, Michigan
