= Houston Music Hall =

Defunct music hall

Coordinates: 29.761453°N 95.369546°W

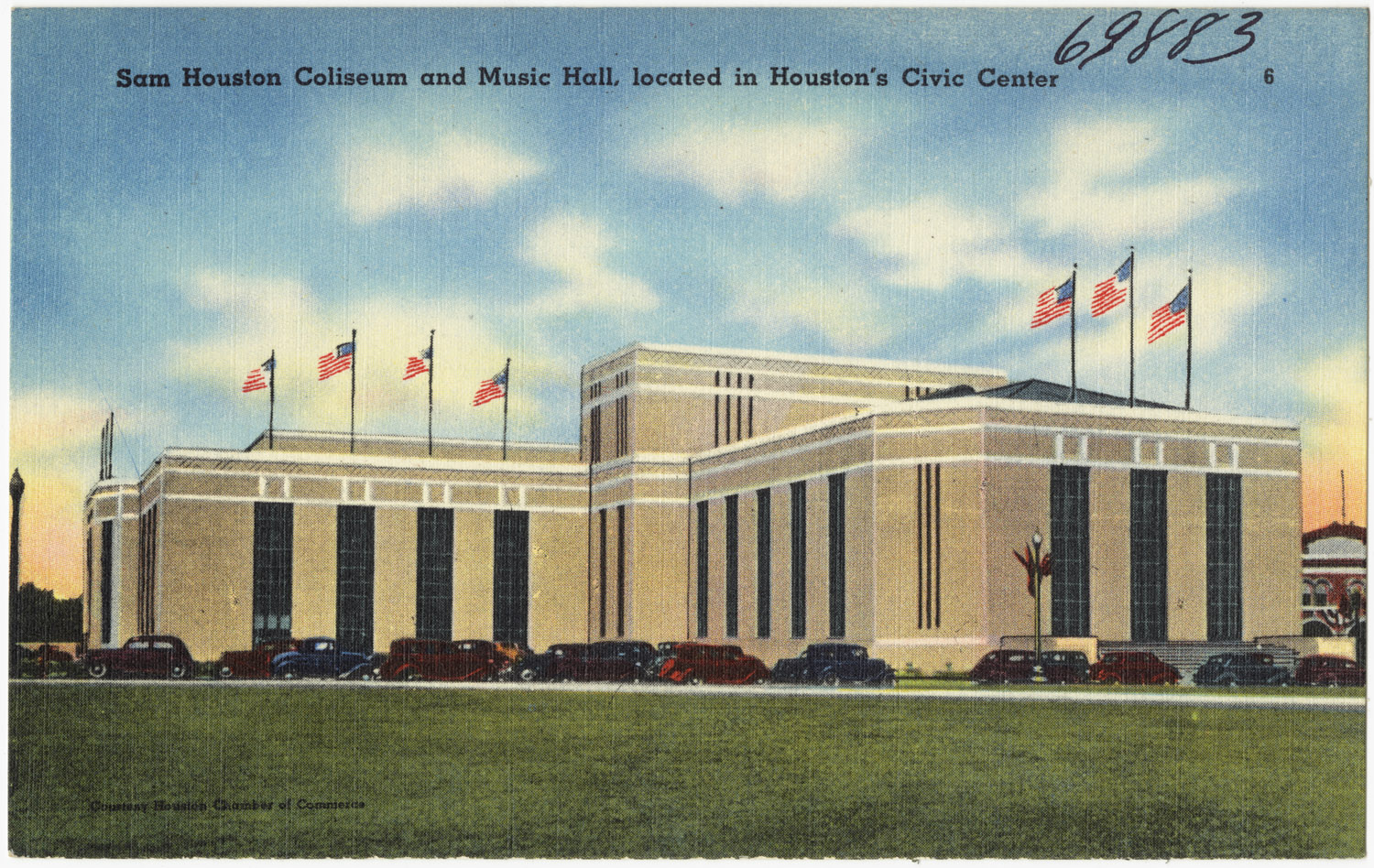
Sam Houston Coliseum and Music Hall circa 1940

Houston Music Hall was a 2,200-seat music venue located in Houston, Texas. The Music Hall opened in November 1937, at the same time as the Sam Houston Coliseum, which were built conjointly as the brainchild of Jesse H. Jones, and designed by Alfred C. Finn, his frequent collaborator. The project was financed by the Works Progress Administration at a cost of $1.3 million, and replaced Sam Houston Hall, which was a wooden structure that had been erected on the site for the 1928 Democratic National Convention and torn down in 1936.

The hall was demolished in 1998. The former site of the building was redeveloped into the Hobby Center for the Performing Arts, which opened in 2003.
