= State National Bank =

State National Bank or State National Bank Building may refer to:

- State National Bank (El Paso, Texas), listed on the National Register of Historic Places (NRHP)
- State National Bank Building (Houston, Texas), NRHP-listed
