= Capitol Lofts =

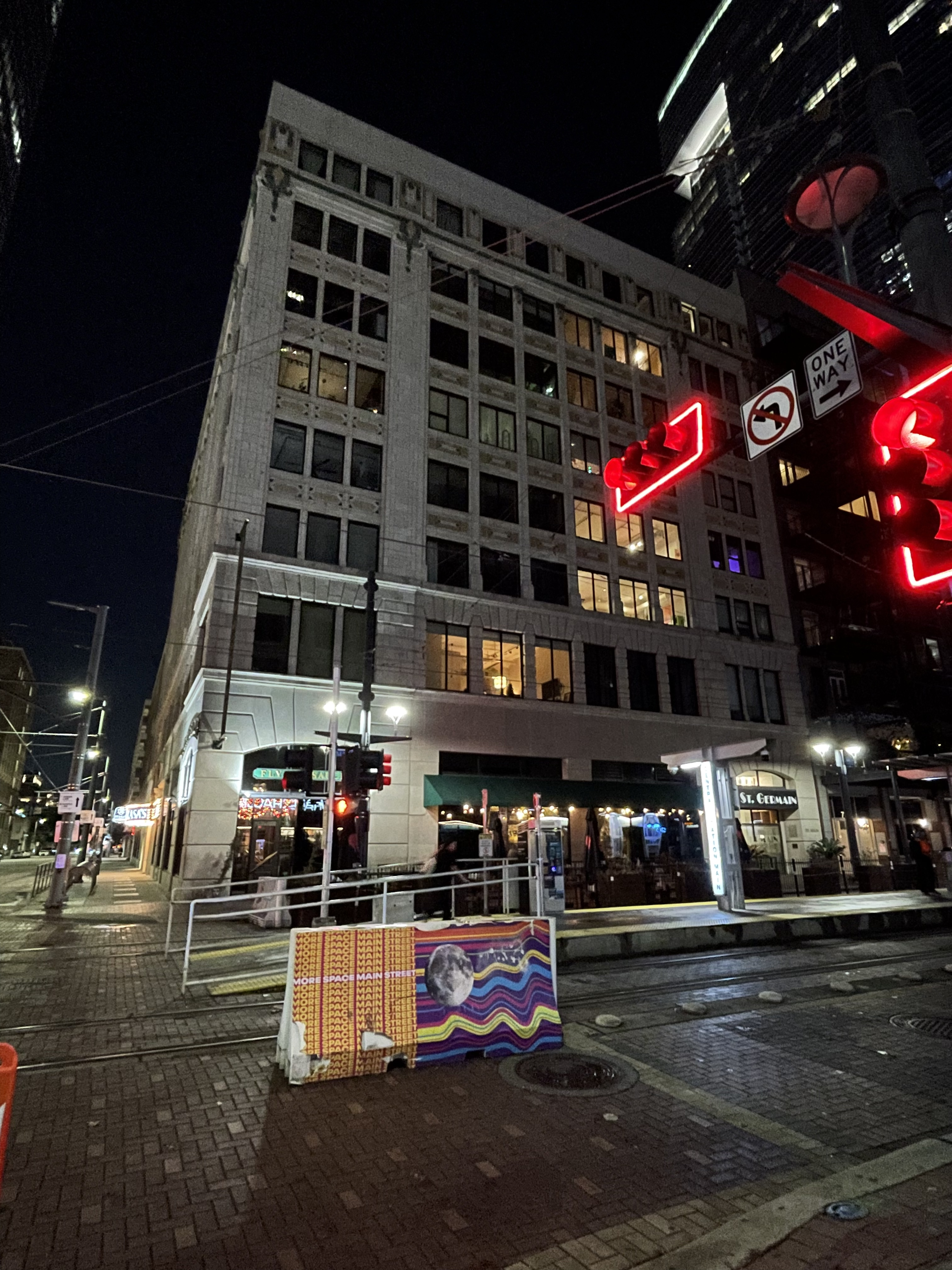
- Interactive map of the Capitol Lofts area
- Former names: M.E. Foster Building; Southern Standard Building

General information
- Status: Completed
- Type: Residential apartments
- Architectural style: Modernism
- Location: 709 Main Street; Houston, Texas
- Coordinates: 29.758787°N 95.363254°W
- Completed: 1908

Height
- Roof: 40.8 m (134 ft)

Technical details
- Floor count: 10

Design and construction
- Architect: Alfred Charles Finn

The Capitol Lofts is a building located at 711 Main Street in downtown Houston, Texas. Constructed in 1908, the building was originally used for office space and was converted to residential lofts in the 1990s. The building was the tallest building in Houston and Texas until being surpassed by the Praetorian Building in Dallas, Texas as the tallest building in Texas in 1909. It remained the tallest in Houston until 1910 when surpassed by the Carter Building.

Designed by architect Alfred C. Finn, the building's original facade was covered with granite and glass in the 1980s.

== Zoned schools ==
Franklin Lofts is within the Houston Independent School District. As of 2015 the building is assigned to Gregory Lincoln Education Center (Grades K-8), and Davis High School.

The building was previously zoned to Bruce Elementary School, and E. O. Smith Education Center (for middle school).
