= City National Bank Building (Houston) =

Historic building in Houston, Texas, U.S.

- U.S. National Register of Historic Places
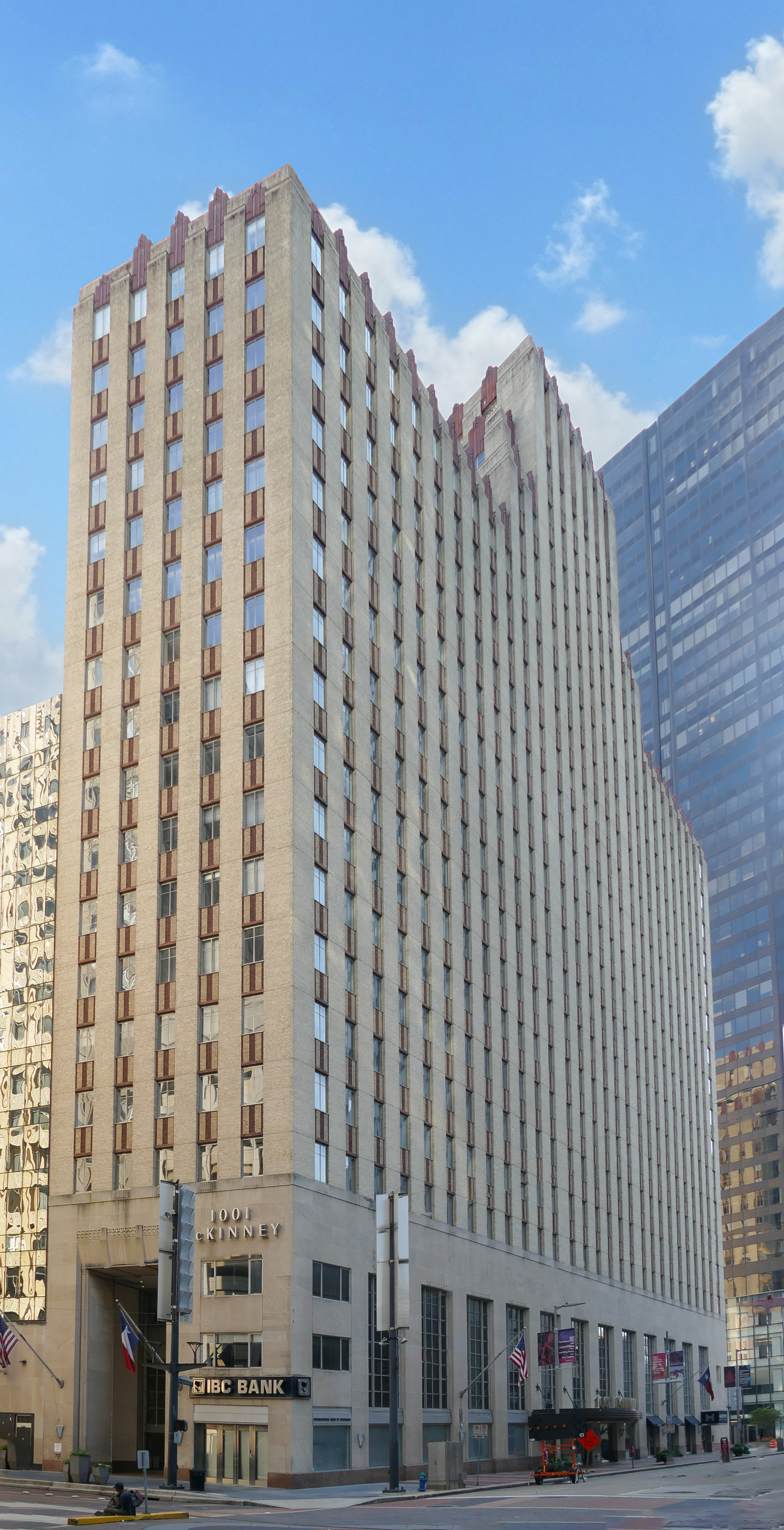
- The building's exterior in 2020

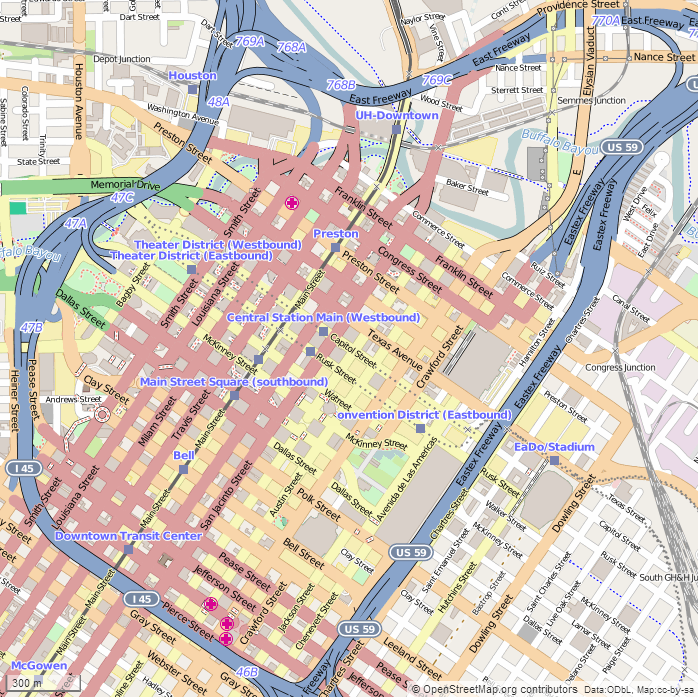
- Location within Houston Downtown Location within Texas Location within the United States
- Location: 1001 McKinney Ave., Houston, Texas
- Coordinates: 29°45′24.8″N 95°21′51.5″W
- Area: less than one acre
- Built: 1946
- Architect: Alfred C. Finn
- Architectural style: Moderne
- NRHP reference No.: 00000291
- Added to NRHP: April 3, 2000

On 3 April 2000, the City National Bank Building, located at 1001 McKinney Avenue in Houston, Texas, was listed on the National Register of Historic Places on April 3, 2000.

== Description and history ==
The firm of Alfred C. Finn designed the building for City National Bank in 1947. City National Bank was the name of the Houston bank which descended from Guaranty Trust Company, the original bank founded by James Anderson Elkins, Sr. in 1924.

When the building first opened, the bank leased the retail frontage to Corrigan's Jewelry, while the bank occupied the rest of the ground space, but with ceilings raised to a third floor elevation. The bank also let 19 floors of the upper floors as office space. The top two floors are reserved for the building's infrastructure. The McKinney Street side of the building takes the whole block running from Main Street to Fannin Street, running 250 feet along that side. Instead of a rectangular profile, the top floors form the smallest tier, and each tier grows broader until the building's base, which occupies the whole lot. The Main Street side of the building has a narrow profile. The building also featured modern infrastructure, including eight high-speed elevators, and a kind of modular flooring which hid the conduits.

The City National Bank Building leased almost all of its space by the time it had opened. Among it tenants were well-known national companies such as Braniff, DuPont, Humble Oil (later known as Exxon), Monsanto, and Phillips Petroleum. A local radio station, KPRC, transmitted from the 23rd floor.

City National Bank operated out of the ground floor lobby for about a decade.

A parking garage was added in 1999, which is attached to the original building via a skyway at the 6th floor. The building has direct access to the Houston underground pedestrian system.

== See also ==
- National Register of Historic Places listings in Harris County, Texas
