= Benjamin Apartments =

Historic apartment building in Houston, Texas

- U.S. National Register of Historic Places
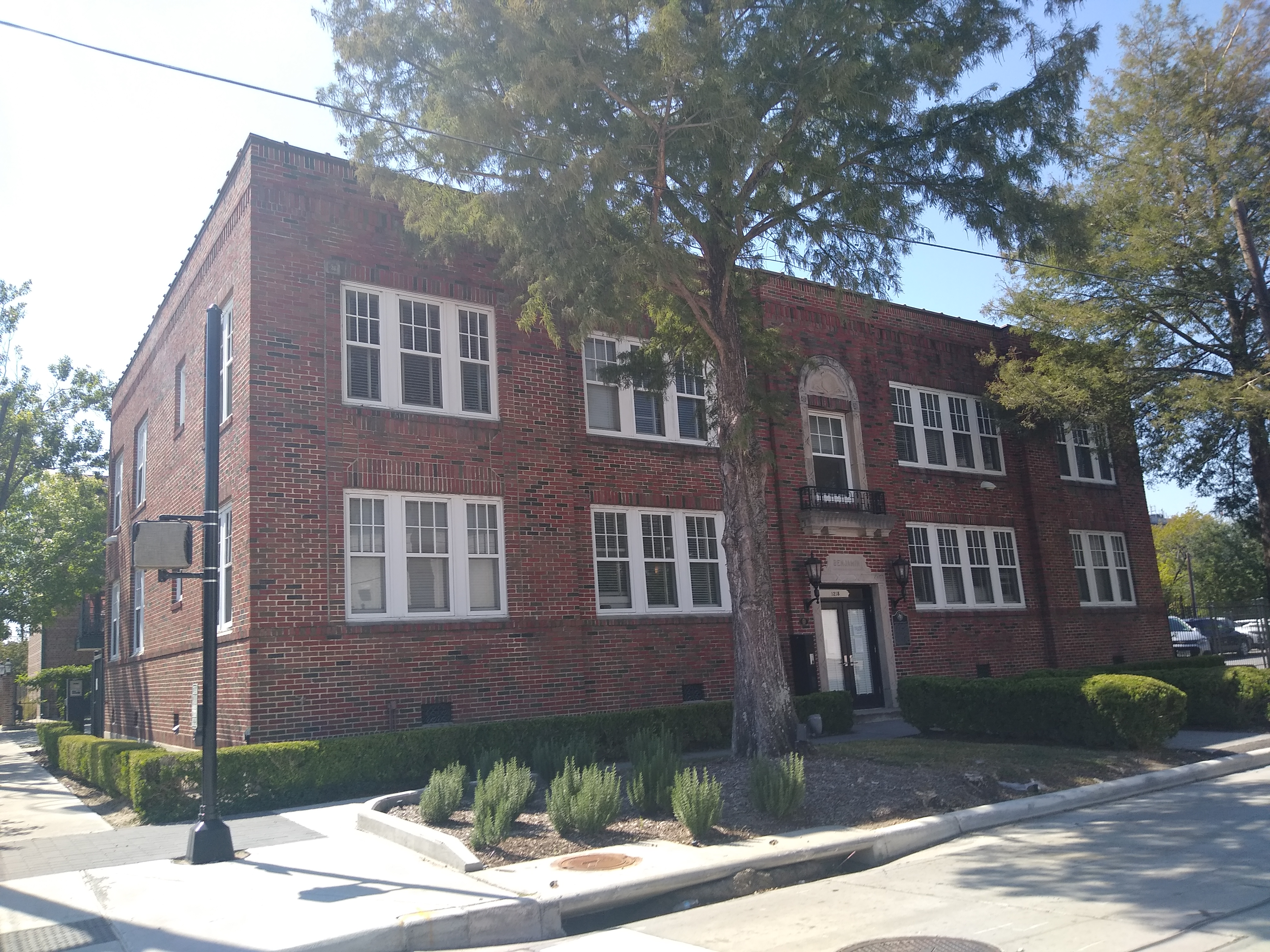
- Frontage on Webster Street

- Location within Texas Location within the United States
- Location: 1218 Webster, Houston, Texas
- Coordinates: 29°44′47″N 95°22′11″W
- Area: less than one acre
- Built: 1924
- Architect: Alfred C. Finn
- Architectural style: Arts and Crafts, Renaissance Revival
- NRHP reference No.: 02001063
- Added to NRHP: 29 July 2003

The Benjamin Apartments is a building in Midtown, Houston listed on the National Register of Historic Places. It was designed by local architect, Alfred C. Finn, and completed in 1924. It was first an owner-occupied four-plex. Later it was used as a hospital in 1945, converted to single-family residential use in 1970, and after 1997, re-purposed as law offices. The building was vacant through most of the 1950s and 1960s.

== History ==
The Benjamin Apartments building is located on Webster at the corner of Caroline in Houston's Midtown neighborhood. Benjamin Cohen commissioned the design work for the four-plex in 1919, and resided in one of apartments for the first sixteen years of its existence. The apartments were converted for use as a hospital in 1945, which was known as Home Hospital and later as Physicians and Surgeons Hospital. A map from the early 1950s confirms its use as a hospital, but it lay vacant for seven years after 1952. By this time, the previous suburban character of the neighborhood transitioned to commercial buildings and boarding houses. An attempt to revive the building as a hospital in 1960 failed quickly as it stood unused from 1961 through 1968.

One room at the Benjamin was rented as an apartment in 1969 before John and Blanche Bankes converted it to a single-family residence in 1970. John Bankes lived there until his death in 1993, and Blanche remained there until 1997. A law firm acquired the property a year later, performed some renovations, then resold it to a real estate partnership in 1999. Mid-Continent Houston Properties, LTD converted the building to office use for one tenant.

== Architectural characteristics ==
The Benjamin represents an early-20th-century stylistic synthesis of the Arts and Crafts movement with Renaissance Revival elements. Decorative flourishes at the front entrance are rendered into relatively austere interpretations. Subtle modulations in the polychrome patterns of the brick work introduce another decorative element. Non-original features of the property as recently as 2002 include: a metal fence around the back of the property, a car port, a paved surface parking lot, and an area for the dumpster and utilities.

== Gallery ==
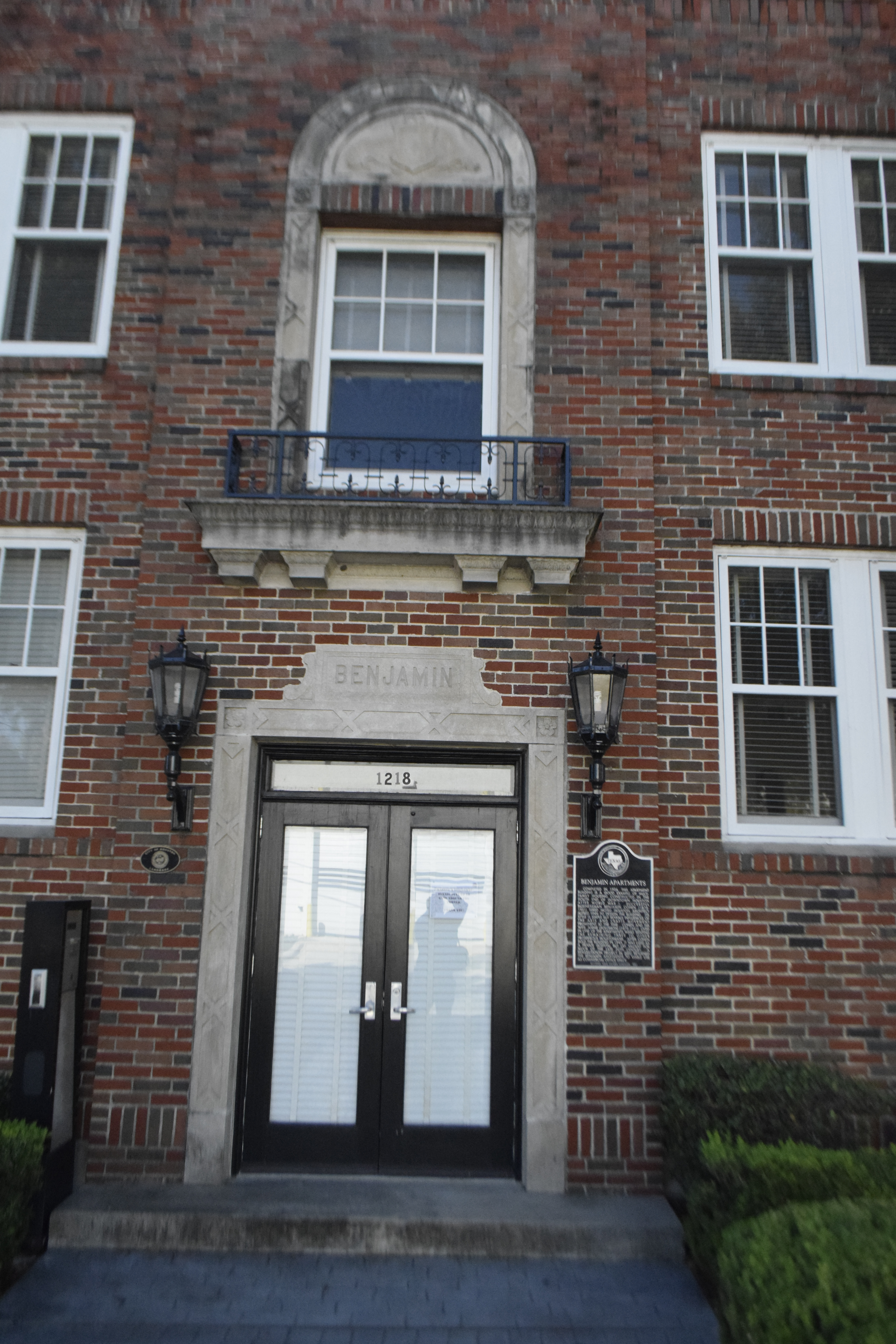
Front entry on Webster

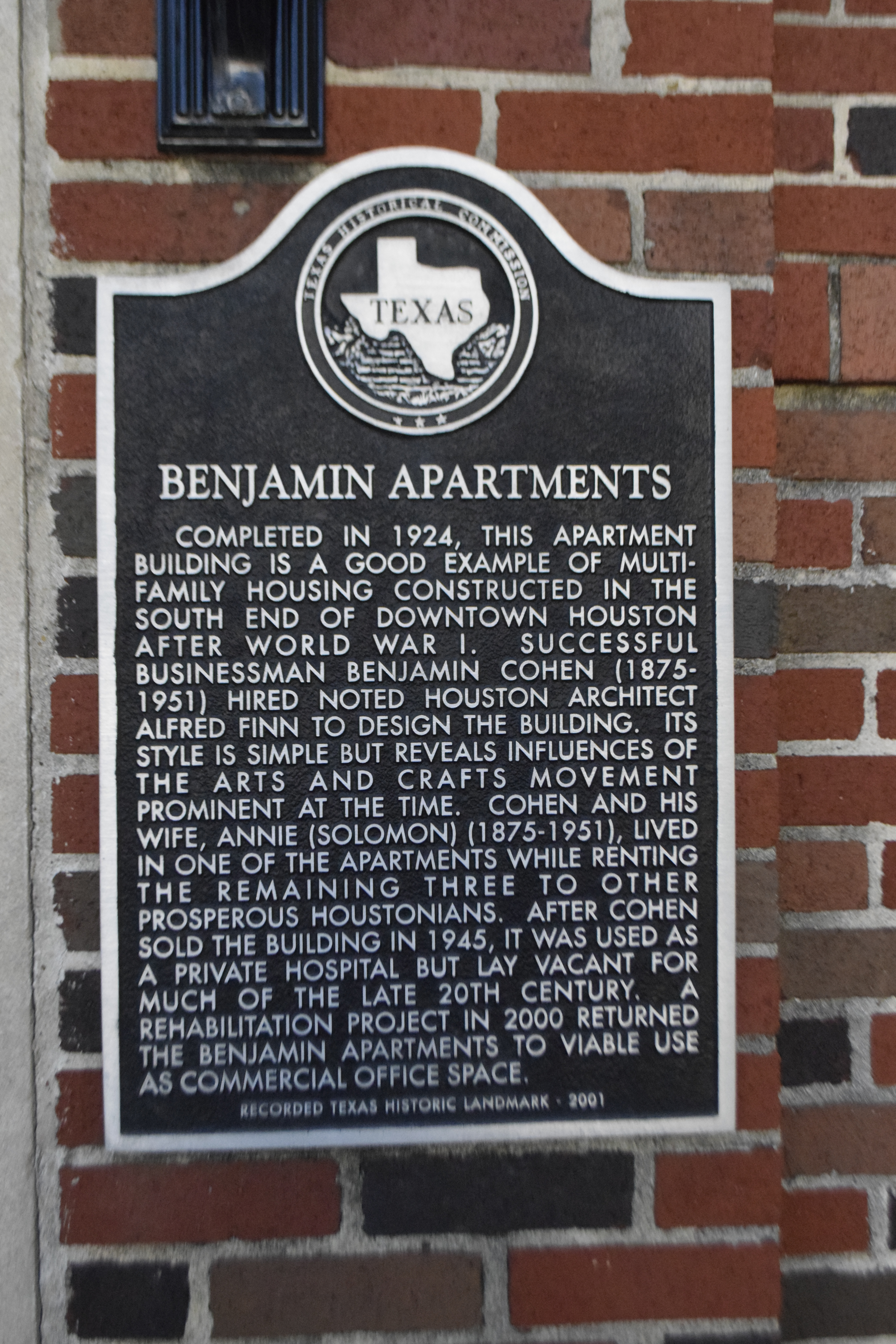
Texas Historical Marker
