= Sam Houston Hall =

Coordinates: 29°45′42.70″N 95°22′11.95″W

The Sam Houston Hall was a building in Houston, Texas. It was located at 801 Bagby Street in the Fourth Ward, though now considered a part of downtown. It was designed as a temporary structure for the 1928 Democratic National Convention. It served as the venue for the Houston Livestock Show and Rodeo from 1932 to 1936, after which it was demolished.

== History ==
The Sam Houston Hall was a wooden structure covering a length of three football fields erected for the 1928 Democratic National Convention. It was designed by Kenneth Franzheim and Alfred C. Finn under contract with Jesse H. Jones, who insisted on a venue that would accommodate the conventioneers and thousands of spectators. The building was optimized for air flow and equipped with heavy duty "typhoon fans." However, it was also designed as a racially-segregated facility: a substandard area fenced off by chicken wire was designated for African Americans. The hall was completed within four months.

Sam Houston Hall hosted the first Houston Livestock Show and Rodeo in the spring of 1932. A streetcar system made the hall accessible to many Houstonians. It was also located close to the Houston Farmers' Market. The first show, in the middle of the Great Depression, drew 2,000 people. The show was held annually at the hall through 1936.

The Sam Houston Hall was torn down after the 1936 Livestock Show and Rodeo, then replaced by the Sam Houston Coliseum. The site is now occupied by the Hobby Center for the Performing Arts.
