= People's National Bank Building (Tyler, Texas) =

Historic office building in Tyler, Texas

- U.S. National Register of Historic Places
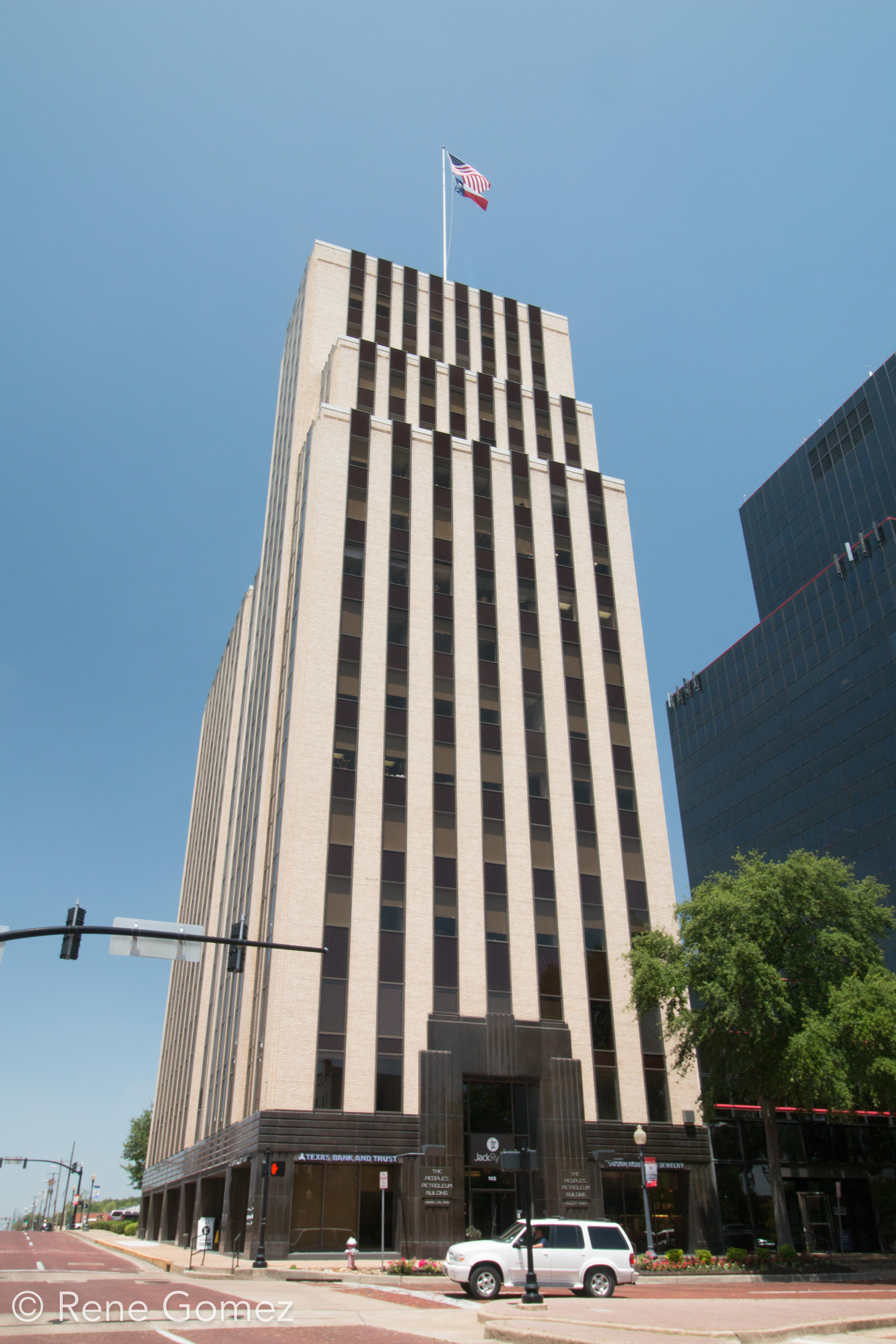

- Location within Texas Location within the United States
- Location: 102 N. College Avenue, Tyler, Texas
- Coordinates: 32°21′03″N 95°18′06″W
- Area: less than an acre
- Built: 1932
- Built by: Campbell & White; Universal Contracting of Houston (poured foundation)
- Architect: Alfred C. Finn
- Architectural style: Art Deco
- NRHP reference No.: 02000896
- Added to NRHP: August 22, 2002

People's National Bank Building is a high-rise building in Courthouse Square, Tyler, Texas, at 102 N. College Street. It is listed on the National Register of Historic Places. The Art Deco building was designed by noted Texas architect Alfred C. Finn, who touted an extensive portfolio of steel-framed skyscrapers when the People's National Bank Building was completed in 1932. Since 2014 it has been known as the People's Petroleum Building.

== History ==
Local attorney and judge Samuel A. Lindsey commissioned the People's National Bank Building in 1932, amidst the Great Depression. Lindsey was also a local real estate investor and chairman of the bank. He established the People's National Company as a medium to finance the project while limiting liability to the bank and to himself. The building is located at the southwest corner of Courthouse Square in downtown Tyler. Block 9, Lot 5 was previously occupied by the two-story Goldstein and Brown mercantile store, which was damaged by a fire as early as 1930. The mercantile partners sold the property to People's National Bank in May 1931. The bank commissioned Houston architect Alfred C. Finn to design a skyscraper to replace the store, and by October, he submitted illustrations for the proposed building. A local contractor, Campbell & White, was responsible for construction, and engaged Universal Contracting of Houston to pour the foundation in April 1932. Campbell & White was the general contractor.

People's National Bank Building opened on 5 November 1932 and was fully leased before the start of 1933. It was home to Tyler's most important business tenants: McMurrey Refining Company, the law firm of Pollard & Lawrence, and Broughton Wilkinson, who started a local oil boom with the development of Daisy Bradford #3. The building's owners responded to the demand for local office space by expanding the four-story wing on West Erwin street to ten stories. It remained the prime office location in Tyler through the 1950s, after which the building lost tenants and attempted to stem the tide with some expensive renovations in 1969. Nation's Bank acquired People's National Bank, then moved into its own new twenty-story building in the early 1980s. This additional office space near the square and the trend of new suburban development in south Tyler caused high vacancy rates in downtown. Tyler Towne Centre acquired the building in 1997, while preserving its appearance. Through 2001, the banking facilities lacked a tenant, but Tyler Towne Centre leased some retail and office space. According to one report, however, the building was mostly unoccupied in 2000. A new ownership group – Garnett and Tim Brookshire, and Andy Bergfeld – began a new renovation project in the early 2010s, replacing infrastructure, including new air conditioning, electrical, and plumbing systems. They renamed it People's Petroleum Building. Renovations of the tenth and eleventh floors created model office space to show to potential tenants. As of September 2014, the ninth and tenth floors were leased, with the eleventh floor refurbished as leasable space.

== Architectural characteristics ==
At the retail level, on the College Street and Erwin sides, the facades are clad in smooth black granite with flutings. The pane glass was originally set in metal frames, but replaced with plate glass set in aluminum frames. The first floor interiors, including the lobby and the banking rooms, are mostly original, decorated in marble and limestone. The elevation is only symmetrical on its College Street side, where the facings are composed mostly of brick and offset by polished black granite.

== Gallery ==
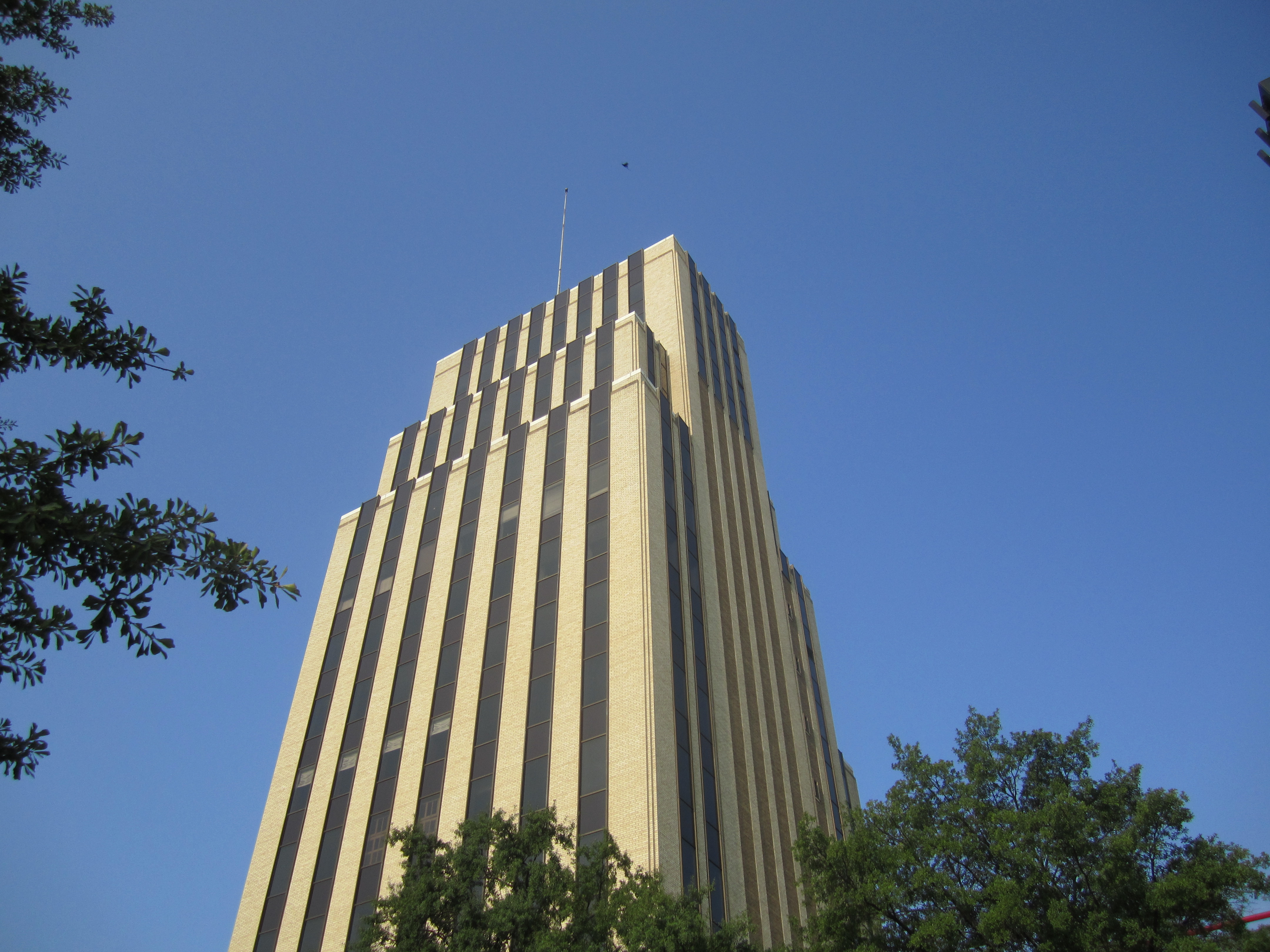
People's National Bank Building in 2012

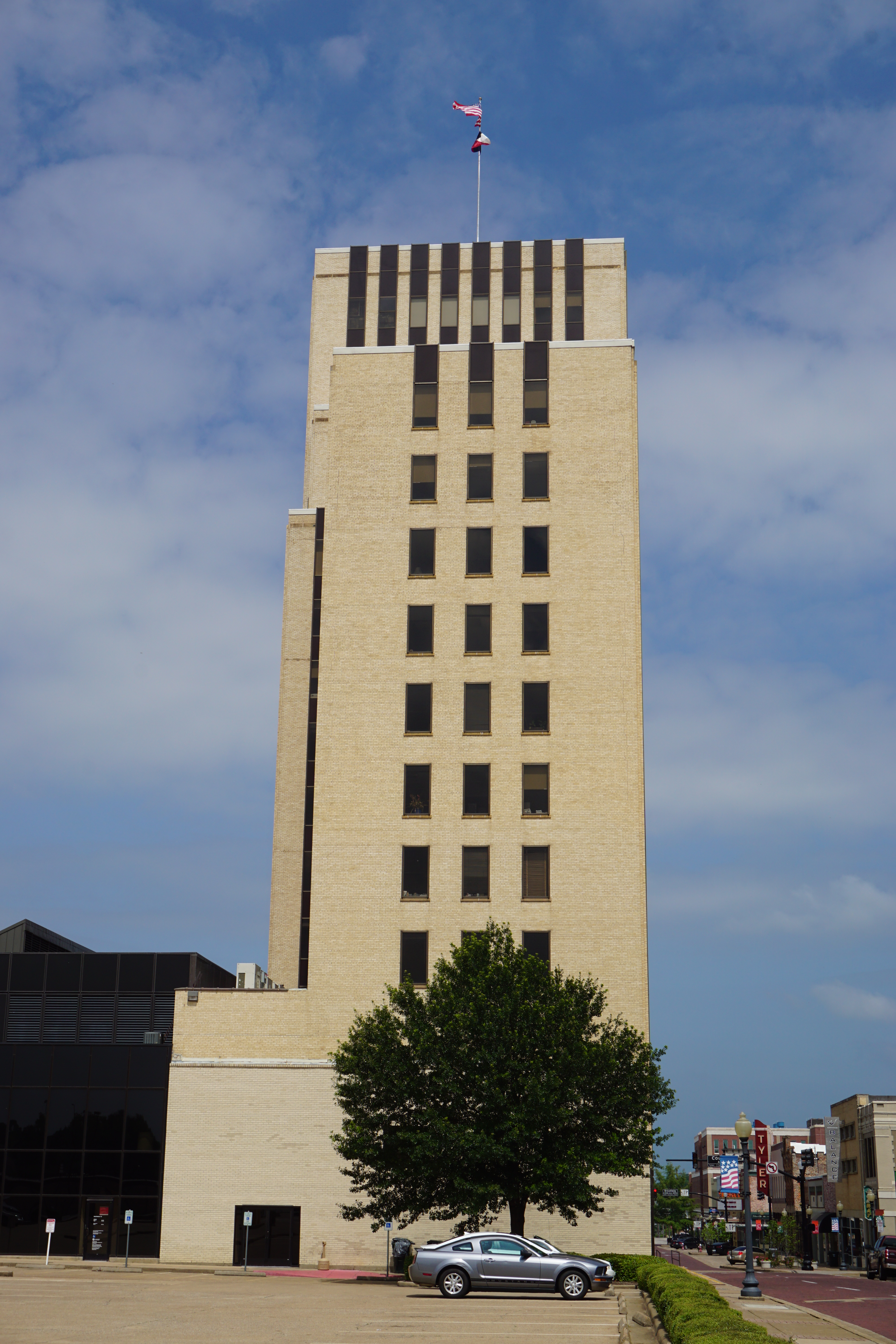
People's National Bank Building in 2016, view from the west

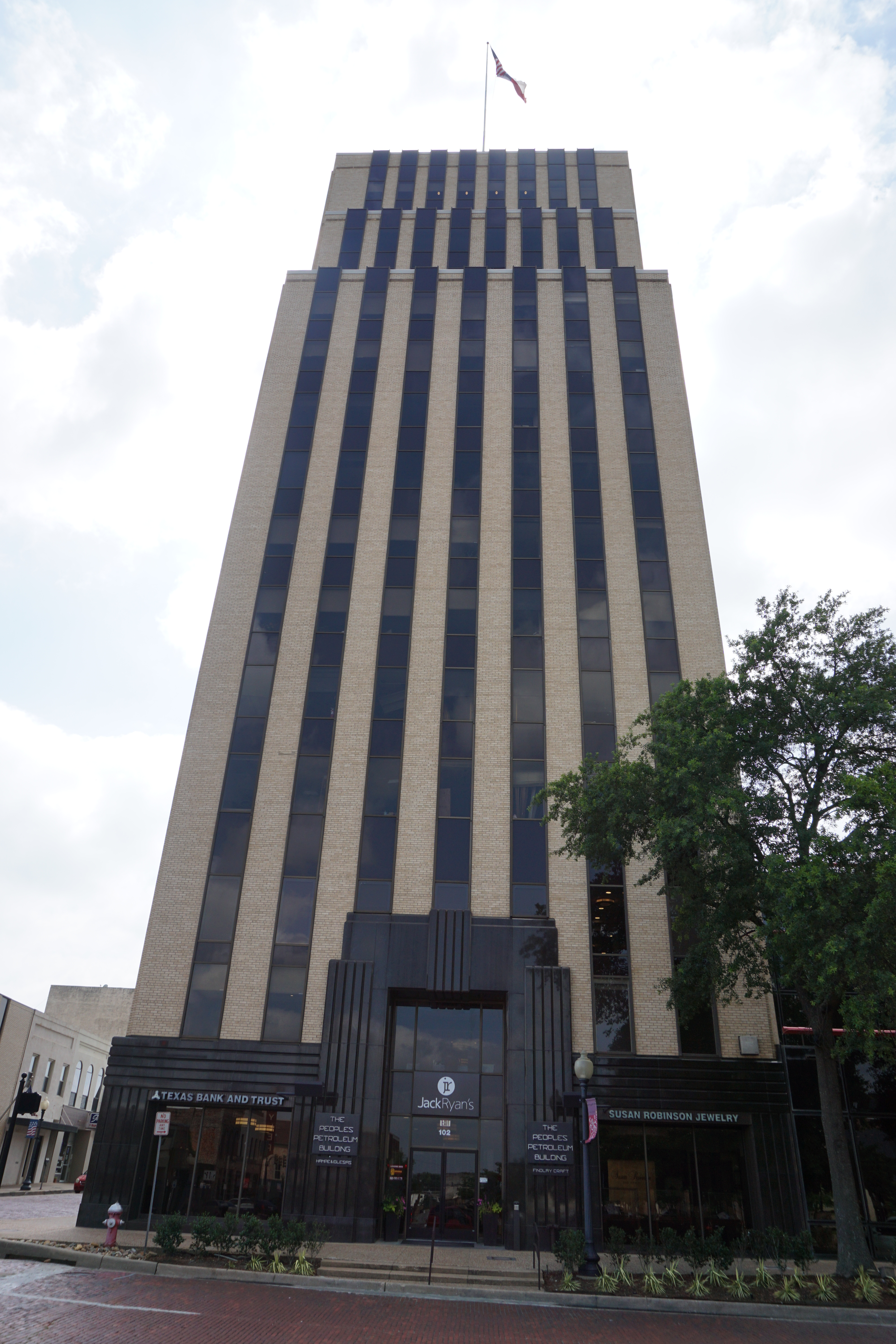
People's National Bank Building in 2016, view from N. College Avenue

== See also ==
- Plaza Tower (Tyler, Texas)
