= Plaza Towers East =

- Location within Iowa

General information
- Status: Completed
- Type: Mixed use
- Architectural style: Modern
- Location: Iowa City, Iowa, United States
- Coordinates: 41.658835°N 91.532007°W
- Completed: 1980; 46 years ago

Height
- Height: 158 feet (48 m)

Technical details
- Floor count: 14

Design and construction
- Architecture firm: Neumann Monson Architects
- Main contractor: McComas-Lacina Construction L.C.

Plaza Towers East is the tallest building in Iowa City, Iowa, United States. Construction on the 14-story Condominium/hotel building began in 2003 and it was completed two years later. It rises to a height of 158 feet (48 m). The 13-story west tower was completed at the same time. The Modern Movement structure was designed by Neumann Monson Architects of Iowa City. McComas-Lacina Construction L.C., also of Iowa City, was responsible for its construction. The first three floors of both towers house commercial space, an extended-stay hotel is located on floors four to six, and three floors of apartments. The top floors are condominiums with penthouse-type units.
