= Plaza Tower (Tyler, Texas) =

Skyscraper in Tyler, Texas

The Plaza Tower
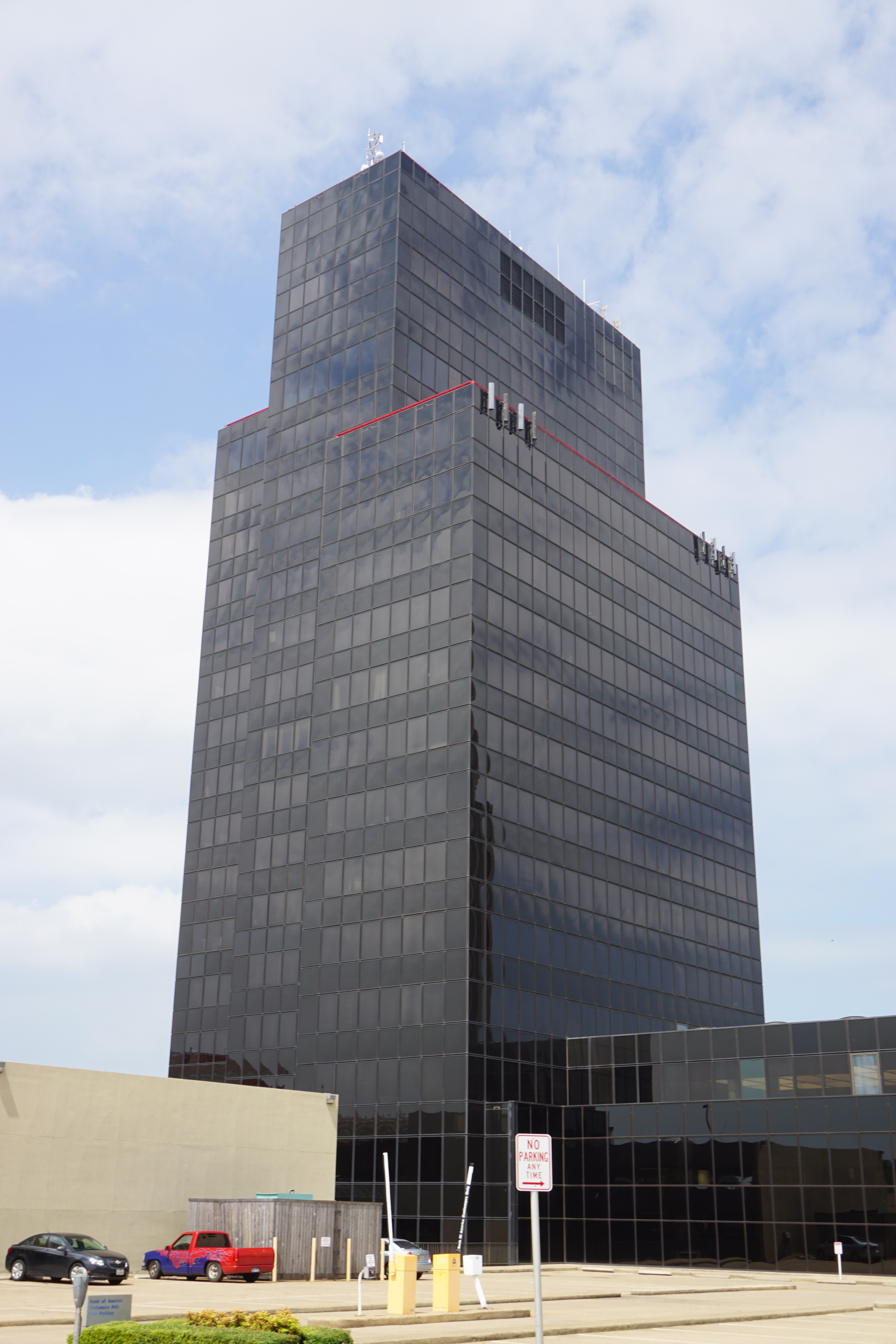
- Tyler May 2016 06 (Plaza Tower) The Plaza Tower in 2016

- Location within Texas

General information
- Status: Completed
- Type: Office
- Architectural style: Modern
- Location: 110 North College Avenue, Tyler, Texas, United States
- Coordinates: 32°21′05″N 95°18′07″W
- Completed: 1980; 46 years ago

Height
- Roof: 280 ft (85 m)

Technical details
- Floor count: 19

Website
- www.plazatowertyler.com

The Plaza Tower (also known as the Plaza Tower Building) is a 280 ft (85 m) tall modern office building located on 110 North College Avenue in downtown Tyler, Texas, US. The building has 19 floors and was built in 1980. Upon its completion, it became the tallest building in Tyler, surpassing the 202 ft (62 m) tall People's Petroleum Building, which held the record since its completion in 1932. The building also stands as the tallest building in northeast Texas.

A covered walkway connects the building to a multi-story parking garage. The tower has various businesses on its ground floor, with one of them being an Andy's Frozen Custard location.

== See also ==
- List of tallest buildings in Texas
- Blackstone Building (Tyler, Texas)
- Tyler City Hall
- William M. Steger Federal Building and United States Courthouse
- Cathedral of the Immaculate Conception (Tyler, Texas)
