= Sam Houston Coliseum =

Arena in Texas, United States

Coordinates: 29.761453°N 95.369546°W

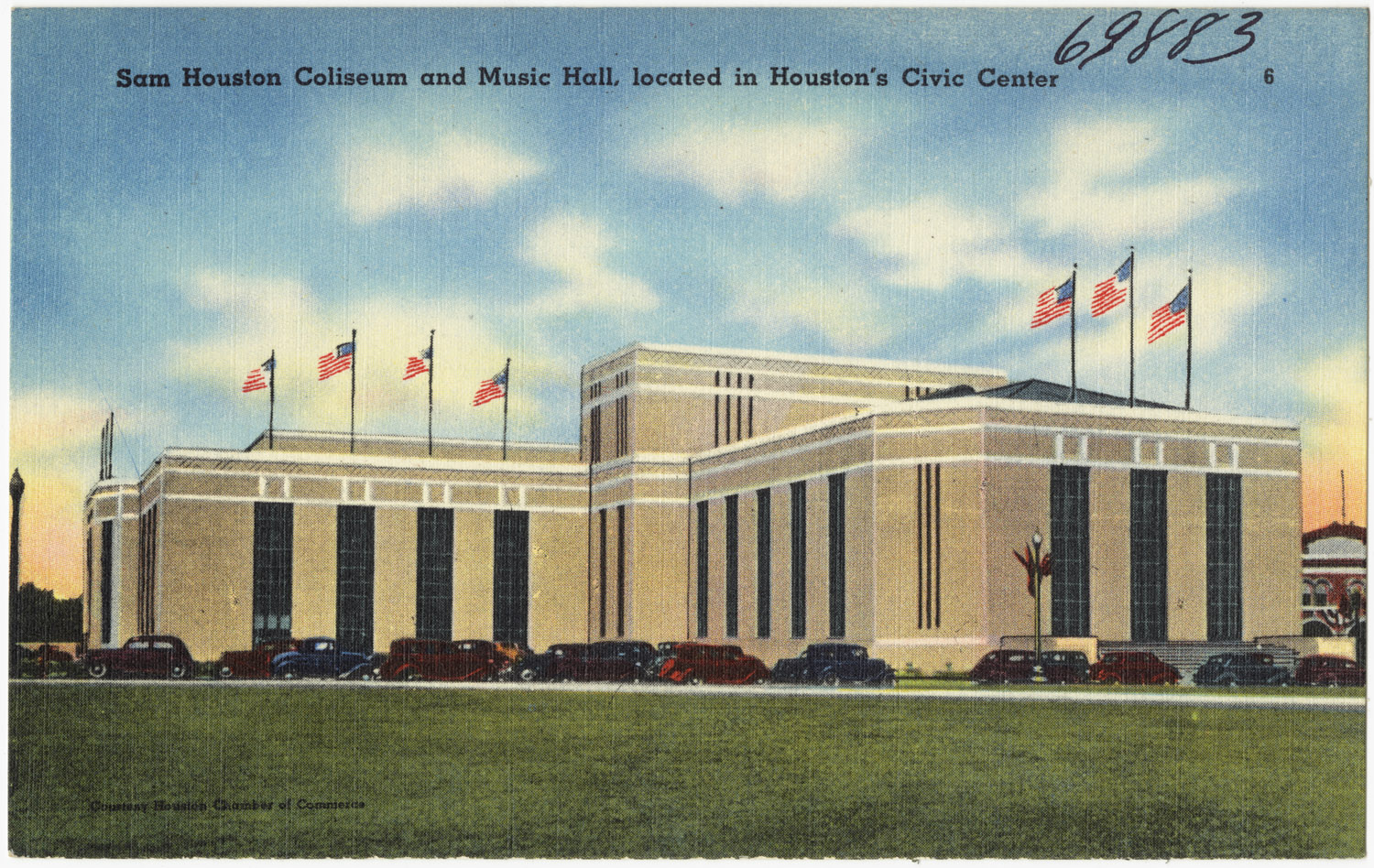
Sam Houston Coliseum and Music Hall circa 1940

Sam Houston Coliseum was an indoor arena located in Houston, Texas.

== Early years ==
Located at 801 Bagby Street in Downtown Houston, the Coliseum and Music Hall complex replaced the Sam Houston Hall, which was a wooden structure that had been erected on the site for the 1928 Democratic National Convention and torn down in 1936. The Public Works Administration contributed $1,329,508 to the project designed by architect Alfred C. Finn. Groundbreaking ceremonies were held on November 4, 1936. The arena opened in November 1937 and had a capacity of 9,200. It was built in conjunction with the Houston Music Hall, which was adjacent to the Coliseum.

== Notable performers ==
On October 14, 1956, Elvis Presley's concert at the Coliseum ended abruptly, as he and his band were taken away by police escort, just before the end of the show as a mob of about 1,000 teenagers rushed the stage, their instruments being destroyed as a result.

On November 21, 1963, United States President John F. Kennedy gave a speech in the Houston Coliseum, on what would be the last night of his life. Kennedy was assassinated in Dallas the following day.

On August 19, 1965, The Beatles performed at the Coliseum to an audience of about 12,000 fans. The other acts that performed that evening were Brenda Holloway and the King Curtis Band, Cannibal & The Headhunters, and Sounds Incorporated.

On August 20, 1967, James Brown performed at the Coliseum.

On July 10, 1968, The Doors performed at the Coliseum with the opening band Moving Sidewalks, featuring Billy Gibbons who would go on to form ZZ Top less than a year later.

On August 4, 1968, Jimi Hendrix performed at Sam Houston Coliseum with his band The Jimi Hendrix Experience.

Supergroup Cream played there on October 24, 1968.

On April 19, 1969, Jimi Hendrix performed at Sam Houston Coliseum with his band The Jimi Hendrix Experience.

Jimi Hendrix played at the venue on June 6, 1970, three months before he died.

Ike & Tina Turner performed at the Coliseum on July 31, 1971.

Trapeze (band) performed at the Colisseum on Saturday, October 21, 1972. The show was recorded and released as a double live album in 2021 called "Trapeze Live in Houston 1972."

Bruce Springsteen & the E Street Band played here November 9, 1974, and again on September 13 and 14, 1975.

Roxy Music performed here on February 29, 1976.

The First National Women's Conference, a milestone for the modern women's movement, was held at the Coliseum in November 1977.

Prince performed here on February 24, 1980.

Ozzy Osbourne with Randy Rhoads played at the venue on June 7, 1981, and February 17, 1982.

Stevie Ray Vaughan with Double Trouble (band) performed at the venue on November 24, 1989, on his last tour before Vaughan's tragic death in a helicopter crash nine months later.

Ice Cube and Too Short bought their Straight From The Underground Tour to Sam Houston on December 23, 1990, with Yo-Yo, D-Nice, Kid Rock, Poor Righteous Teachers, and King T.

The Black Crowes played a free concert at the venue on February 6, 1993. The free show was due to security problems that forced the cancellation of a show during a previous Houston visit. The show was broadcast nationally on radio across North America and also was videotaped for the video "Bad Luck Blue Eyes Goodbye". The audio version was released on EPs, dubbed "High in Houston". This would be the last concert performed at the Coliseum before it was demolished.

== Sports ==
In 1946, permanent ice chillers were installed in the floor to accommodate an ice hockey rink for Houston's first pro ice hockey team – the Houston Skippers of the USHL. The Skippers changed their name the following season to the Houston Huskies and called the Coliseum home until their demise in 1949.

Prior to Hofheinz Pavilion being built (on the campus of the University of Houston), the Houston Cougars played home games at the coliseum.

The venue also played host to the Houston Apollos, of the Central Hockey League, from 1965 to 1969; the Houston Aeros, of the World Hockey Association, from 1972 to 1975 and the Houston Apollos again from 1979 to 1981. The Aeros moved to The Houston Summit, which opened in November 1975 and played their final three seasons there. Notably, complaints from the Aeros about smoking being done in the arena that affected the eyes and lungs enough to lodge a complaint to the City Council, who proceeded to pass an ordinance banning smoking in the Coliseum in May of 1974.

The Houston Mavericks, a charter member of the American Basketball Association, played their home games in the Coliseum. However, the Houston franchise was plagued by mismanagement and low attendance. In 1969, the team relocated and became the Carolina Cougars. The Mavericks drew less than 500 fans for most games; their final game in Houston drew just 89 fans.

The Coliseum was also home to Houston Wrestling, run by the wrestling promoter Paul Boesch. In an event promoted by Boesch, Jack Brisco defeated Harley Race to win the National Wrestling Alliance World Heavyweight Championship at the Coliseum on July 20, 1973.

Before moving to the Astrodome, it was the home of the Houston Livestock Show and Rodeo.

== Fate ==
By the 1970s, the arena was starting to show its age. Its fate was effectively sealed in 1971, when the NBA's San Diego Rockets moved to Houston and insisted on building a new arena—what became the Summit—as a replacement. When the Rockets arrived, they would not even consider playing in the Coliseum while the Summit was being built, deeming it inadequate even for temporary use; instead, they played their first few seasons at Hofheinz Pavilion.

Sam Houston Coliseum was demolished in 1998. The former site of the Sam Houston Coliseum was redeveloped into the Hobby Center for the Performing Arts, which opened in 2003.

== See also ==
- Sam Houston, general who secured Texas independence and namesake of the coliseum
- Sam Houston (wrestler), wrestler who wrestled in the coliseum
