= L. A. and Adelheid Machemehl House =

Historic place in Bellville, Austin County, Texas

Coordinates: 29.9429°N 96.2547°W

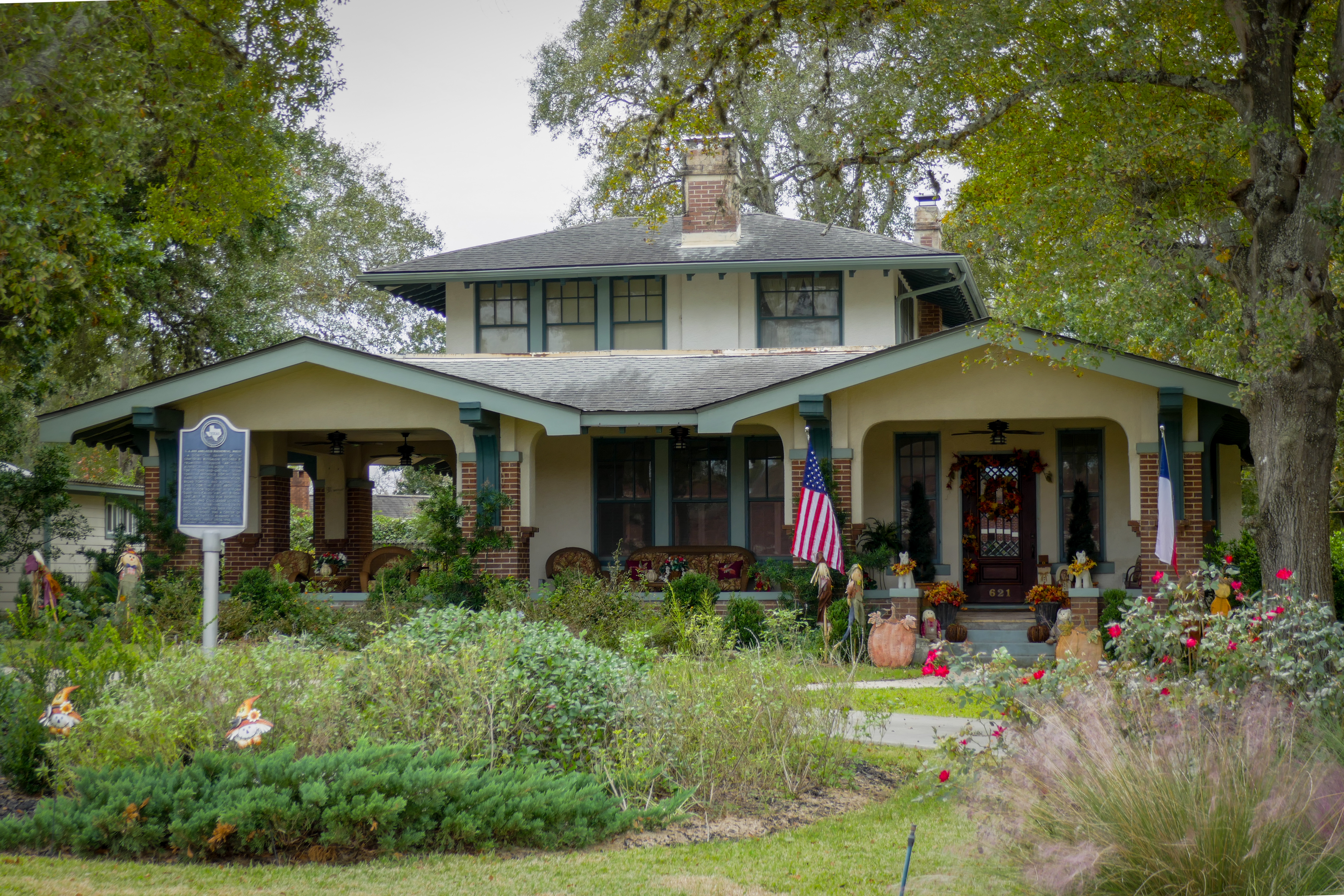
Front exterior of Machemehl House

The L. A. and Adelheid Machemehl House, a Texas Historical Landmark of the Texas Historical Commission, was built in the early 20th century. The house was a center of social activity for the German Texan community in Bellville, Texas, United States.

== Family history ==
The Machemehl family and companions were brought to Texas by Johann Machemehl, (1816–1880), and his father, Michael Machemehl, in 1849. Once in Texas, they settled in the Bellville area of Austin County, Texas. Johann, university educated, was formerly the forester for the city of Annaberg in Saxony. His wife Henrietta (1814–1850) died in Texas in 1850 and is buried at the Machemehl Cemetery. Johann married twice more, had four more children, died in 1880 and is also buried at the Machemehl Cemetery.

Johann's son Paul Machemehl (1845–1932) is known for his participation in the passage to Mexico that numerous German Texans endured during the American Civil War. Documents located at the Eula and David Wintermann Library in Eagle Lake, Texas report that local German Texans were "discussing the hostility between the North and the South with Paul Machemehl of Bellville. Many Germans did not believe this was their fight and many joined Paul Machemehl."

Paul's son Louis A. Machemehl, (1881–1952), was a German Texan civic leader as well as a rancher and land and cattle broker. He married Aldelheid Reichardt (1882–1949) of Cat Springs. She was the daughter of Charles Reichardt (1852–1882), a Colorado County farmer who died a month before Aldeheid was born on August 24, 1882.

Louis and Adelheid Machemehl's son, Charles W. Machemehl (1922–2005), served in the European theater as a forward observer. He received several medals including two Bronze Stars and a Silver Star. At the end of the war he had attained the rank of captain and was a member of the staff of General Matthew B. Ridgeway, 1st Allied Airborne Army.

== Architecture and location ==
In 1920, Louis A. Machemehl commissioned Houston architect, Alfred C. Finn, to design the L.A. and Adelheid Machemehl House in Bellville, Texas. The structure is a 1 1/2-story house built in Airplane Bungalow style. The upstairs portion is set behind a large wrap-around porch. Many festivities and social occasions took place on that porch for the local community. These festivals including dances for the youth of the city to the music of a Victrola. The house has a southwestern view of the historic German Texan settlement of Cat Springs. In its present condition, large oaks and magnolias trees surround the house. It is located one and a half miles from the town square. The architect's original watercolor rendition and floor plans are in the archives of the Houston Public Library. The structure is recorded as a Texas Historic Landmark of the Texas Historical Commission. It was originally built for Louis A. Machemehl, his wife Adelheid Machemehl (d. 1949), and their five children (including Charles W. Machemehl). The landmark remained in the Machemehl family until 1953.

== Historical recognition and awards ==
- The House was recorded as a Texas Historic Landmark in 1992.
- The House received the "Best Front Porch Award" given by Arrington's Bed and Breakfast Journal.
