= James L. Autry House (Courtlandt Place, Houston) =

Historic house in Houston, Texas

- U.S. National Register of Historic Places
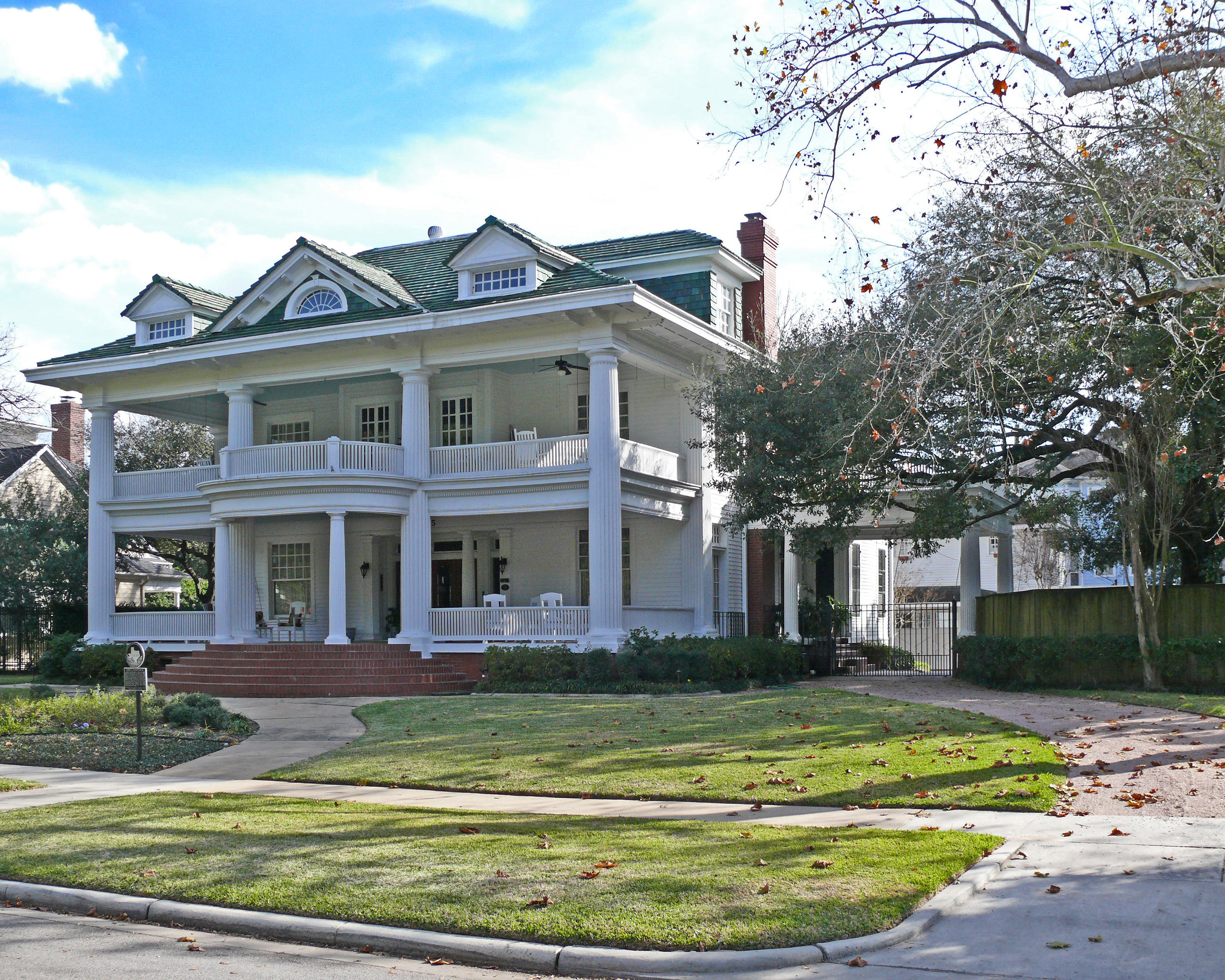
- James L. Autry House
- Location: 5 Courtlandt Place; Houston, Texas; United States
- Coordinates: 29.743°N 95.382°W
- Area: Courtlandt Place Historical District
- Built: 1912
- Architect: Sanguinet & Staats, Alfred C. Finn
- Architectural style: Neoclassical Revival
- NRHP reference No.: 79002953
- Added to NRHP: June 14, 1979

James L. Autry House is located at 5 Courtlandt Place in Houston, Texas, and is listed on the National Register of Historic Places. Design is credited to Alfred C. Finn, when he worked for the Fort Worth architecture firm of Sanguinet & Staats, and was executed in 1912. Autry was a general counsel and director for Texaco.

== Architecture ==
The James L. Autry House was designed by Alfred C. Finn working under the commission of Sanguinet & Staats in 1912. The house is located at 5 Courtlandt Place, which is a private street in Houston. The house is next door to a greenhouse and tennis courts at 3 Courtlandt Place, a property that was developed at the same time as the main house.

Finn designed the two and a half story Neoclassical Revival structure to be supported with a wood frame. This cubic area defines the main part of the house, fronted by a half-moon Doric portico, which is supported by in the front by two small Doric columns. The portico fronts a double-gallery with balustrades, where the front of the double-gallery is defined by four large, fluted Doric columns. The front of the hipped roof includes two wide dormers with multiple-paned sash, and the sides of the main part of the house are graced by two exposed brick chimneys. Also flanking the main part of the house are a porte-cochere and a sun room, both capped with balustrades, and preserving the overall symmetry of the structure. Autry had requested that the design emulate a house he had seen in Corsicana, Texas. Construction costs totaled $40,686.

== Biography ==
The house is named for its first owner, James Lockhart Autry, who was general counsel for the Texas Company, now better known as Texaco. He was born in Holly Springs, Mississippi on November 4, 1859, and first moved to Texas in order to manage a ranch in Navarro County. He apprenticed to an attorney in Corsicana, Texas before his admission to the bar in 1880. After forming a law firm with W.J. McKie, Autry began a long business relationship with Joseph S. Cullinan. In 1904, just two years after Spindletop, he followed Cullinan to Beaumont, Texas to work for the Texas Fuel Company, where Cullinan tapped him to serve as general counsel. A year later, Cullinan reorganized his firm, which became the Texas Company, for which Autry served as a founding director and general counsel. Once again, Autry followed Cullinan when the Texas Company moved its headquarters to Houston in 1908. Cullinan, Autry, and Will C. Hogg all resigned in 1913 to form their own partnership, which established several new companies, just a year after Autry established his residence at 5 Courtlandt Place. In 1915, he suffered a debilitating stroke. He died in 1920, survived by his wife, a daughter, and a son, who all remained in the house, which remained in family hands until its sale in 1938.
