= State National Bank Building (Houston, Texas) =

Historic building in Houston, Texas, U.S.

- U.S. National Register of Historic Places
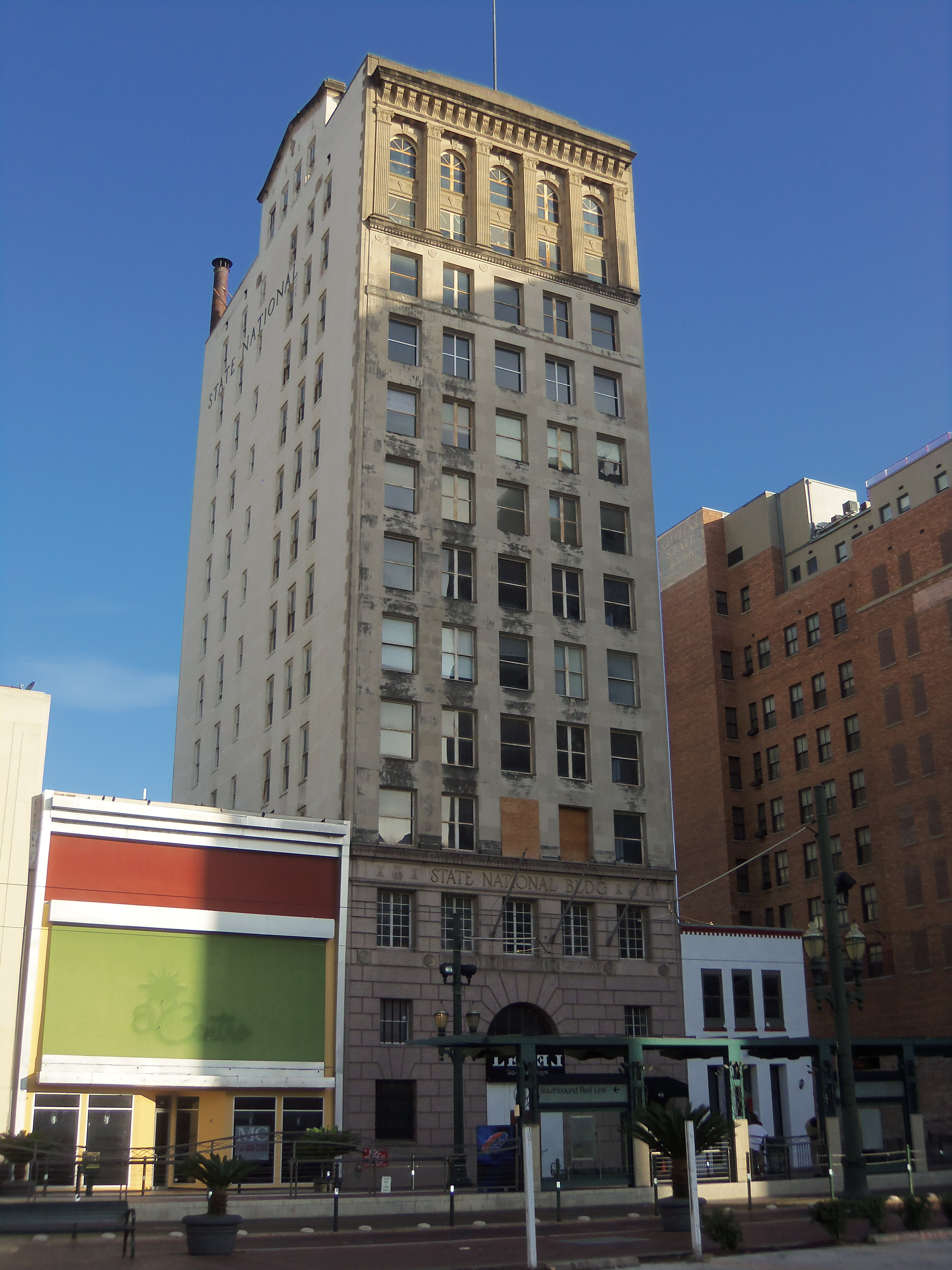
- The building's exterior in 2012

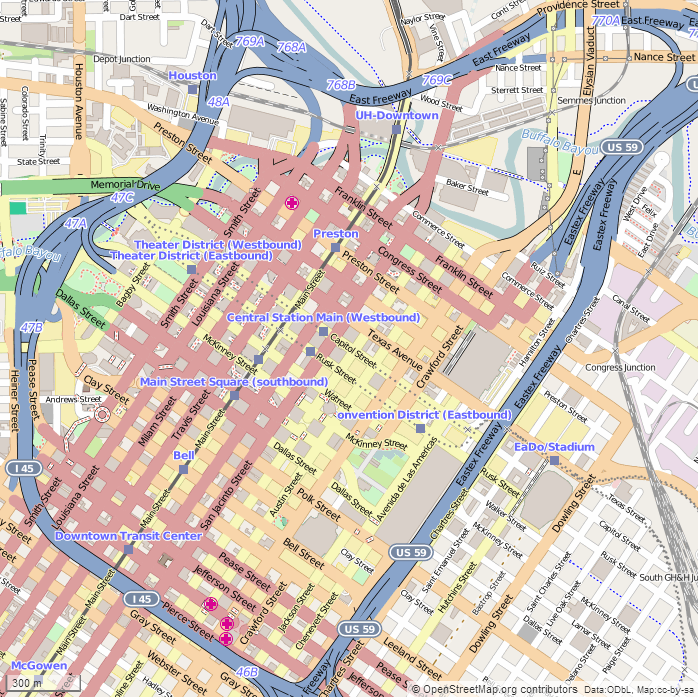
- Location within Houston Downtown Location within Texas Location within the United States
- Location: 412 Main St., Houston, Texas
- Coordinates: 29°45′40″N 95°21′42″W
- Area: less than one acre
- Built: 1923
- Built by: American Construction Company
- Architect: Alfred C. Finn
- Architectural style: Classical Revival, Beaux Arts, Skyscraper
- NRHP reference No.: 82004843
- Added to NRHP: August 11, 1982

The State National Bank Building is a high-rise office building located at 412 Main Street in downtown Houston, Texas. Designed by architect Alfred Charles Finn, the building was built in 1923 in the Spanish colonial style. It was listed on the National Register of Historic Places on August 11, 1982.

== History ==
The State National Bank Building was designed by local architect Alfred C. Finn (1883–1964). Lacking formal training, he came to Houston while working as a draftsman for Sanguinet & Staats of Fort Worth. He stayed with the firm's Houston office for about a year, contributing to the design of two homes in the Courtlandt Place subdivision. He left for private practice in 1913 and remained in Houston. His secured his first commission for a major building as a contractor for Mauran, Russell & Crowell of St. Louis, who hired Finn to supervise the construction of the new seventeen-story Rice Hotel. Finn built at least two other skyscrapers, the Houston Chronicle Building (1913) and the Rusk Building (1916), before his work on the State National Building. It represents the work of an architect of regional importance, and by 1982, represented "one of the few surviving Neo-Classical skyscrapers in the city of Houston."

State National Bank originates from the State Bank and Trust Company, chartered by the state of Texas and opened in 1915. Five years later the bank joined the Federal Reserve System, which led to an alienation of its state charter in favor of a national bank charter. The name changed to State National Bank, which engaged American Construction Company to start building a new skyscraper in 1922. Construction costs are estimated at $500,000 and the building was completed in 1923. The building was soon fully leased and remained so until 1946, when State National Bank vacated its namesake building. In 1947, the real estate brokerage of Huster and Wise purchased the State National Bank Buildings and its two flanking properties for $720,000.

Marriott subsequently converted the State National Building into a Moxy Hotel. The 118-room boutique-style hotel opened in December 2023.

== Building features ==
The skyscraper is in the neo-classical mode with Beaux Arts ornamentation. The first three stories are composed of a first and second story separated by a mezzanine, forming the base of the structure. This base is faced in rough-cut granite, features several ornaments, and displays a large engraving of the motto, “Frugality is the mother of all virtues.” A high arch envelopes the main entry, originally fronted by bronze gates, and further embellished with tablets and lighting fixtures made of bronze. The façade for the upper seven stories are arranged bays with double-hung windows, with interspersed ornaments. A marble stairway leads to the basement, the location of the bank's vaults, conference rooms, and a boiler room. The main lobby is decked in concrete and marble. An aperture in the ceiling provides a partial view of the mezzanine level.

After the first sale of the building, the new owners replaced the rough-hewn granite cladding with polished Indiana limestone in 1948. They removed the banking equipment from the lobby to accommodate a broader range of retail business, while closing off the mezzanine. They also added a metal portico to support a canopy. During the 1960s and 1970s, the building suffered from neglect like many other buildings in downtown Houston. However, starting in 1981 leading up to the property's NRHP-listing in 1983, a new ownership group began restoration of the State National Bank Building. All tenants vacated the building, while workers removed the limestone cladding and endeavored a comprehensive restoration.

== See also ==
- National Register of Historic Places listings in Harris County, Texas
