= Alfred C. Finn =

American architect (1883–1964)

- Born: July 2, 1883; Bellville, Texas, U.S.
- Died: June 26, 1964 (aged 80); Houston, Texas, U.S.
- Occupation: Architect
- Buildings: Rice Lofts; Gulf Building

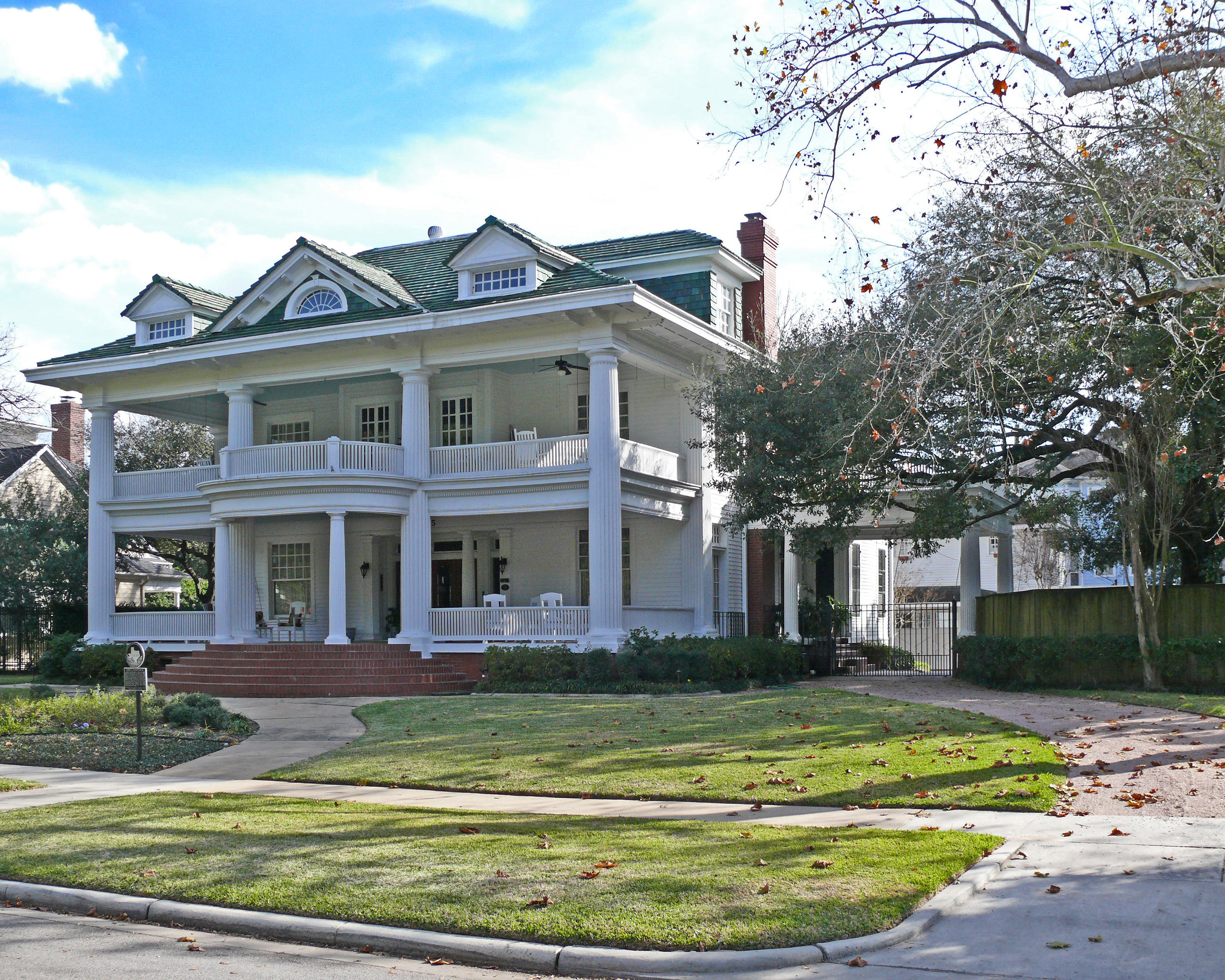
James L. Autry House, Houston, Texas

Alfred Charles Finn (July 2, 1883 – June 26, 1964) was an American architect. He started in the profession with no formal training in 1904 as an apprentice for Sanguinet & Staats. He worked in their offices in Dallas, Fort Worth, and Houston. His credits during his tenure residential structures, but firm was a leader in steel-frame construction of skyscrapers.

Finn practiced independently between 1913 and 1953, first subcontracting as a project manager for the Rice Hotel project. He collaborated on many projects in Houston with Jesse Jones as the pair changed the face of downtown Houston in the 1910s and 1920s. Meanwhile, Finn also supervised or designed buildings in various parts of Texas, including Brenham, Dallas, Galveston, Palestine, and Tyler. He continued architectural work for residential properties in the Houston area. During the 1930s, partly because of his relationship with Jones, Finn worked for the federal government, and later his firm performed contract work for federal agencies. His public buildings included federal buildings, a college administration building and a complex of dormitories, and he designed the San Jacinto Monument. He was one of the leaders in the development of the Art Deco style in Texas, though his work reflects a wide range of styles and syntheses. Along with Joseph Finger, Finn was one of the two leading architects in Houston during the first half of the twentieth century. A number of his works are listed on the National Register of Historic Places (NRHP).

== Early years ==
Alfred Charles Finn was born to Edwin E. and Bertha (Rogge) Finn in Bellville, Texas, the second of eight children. He grew up in Hempstead, Texas, and moved to Houston in 1900 to work for Southern Pacific Railroad as a carpenter and draftsman. In 1904, he started as an apprentice for Sanguinet & Staats in Dallas. After three years, he transferred to the firm's headquarters in Fort Worth, a position he held until 1912. Sanguinet & Staats transferred him to Houston, but he left the firm in 1913 to establish a private practice. However, before leaving the firm, Finn worked on two private residences at Courtlandt Place (both NRHP-listed) for A.S. Cleveland (1911) and James L. Autry (1912), and he is credited with the Link-Lee House on Montrose Boulevard (1912, NRHP-listed).

== Private practice ==
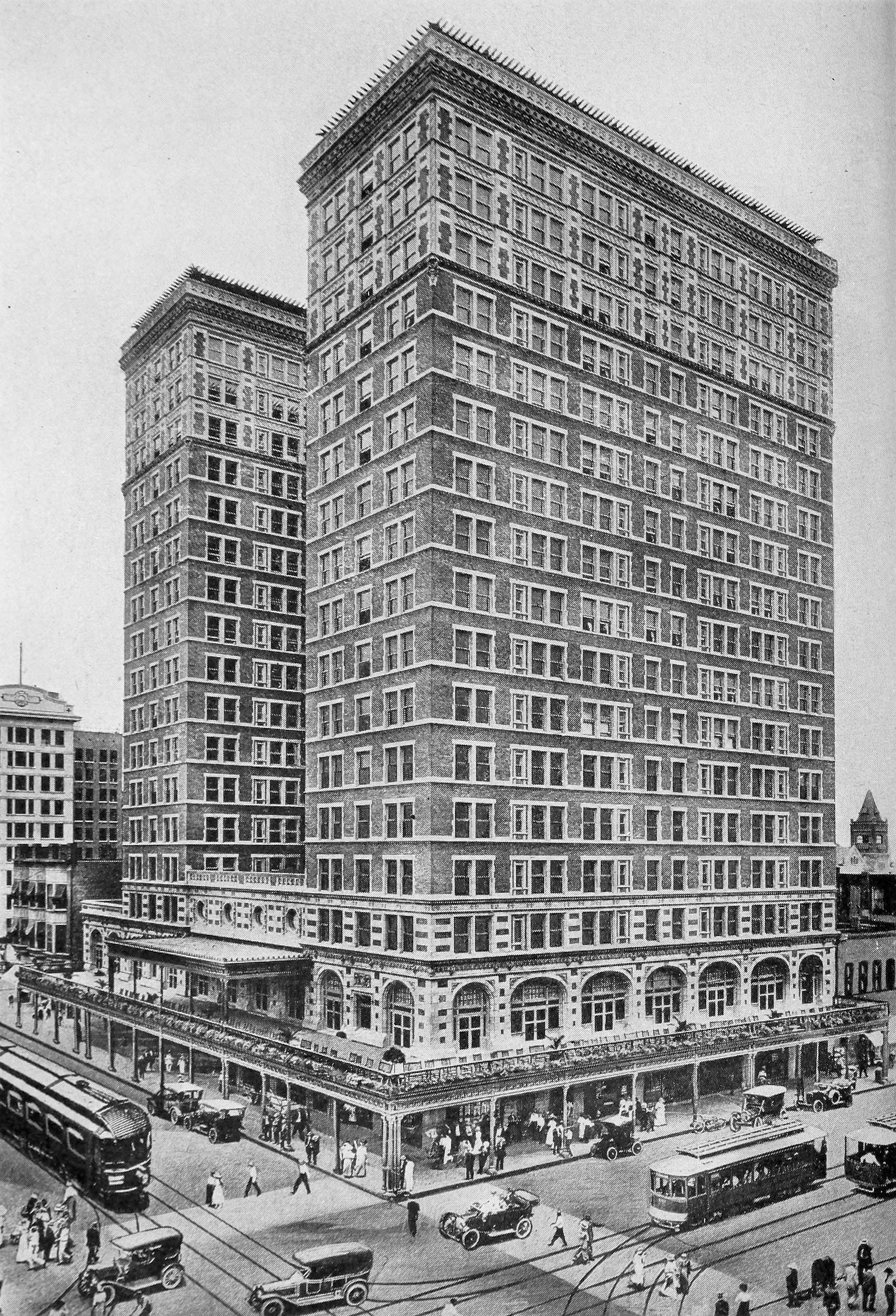
Rice Hotel, Houston, Texas in 1916

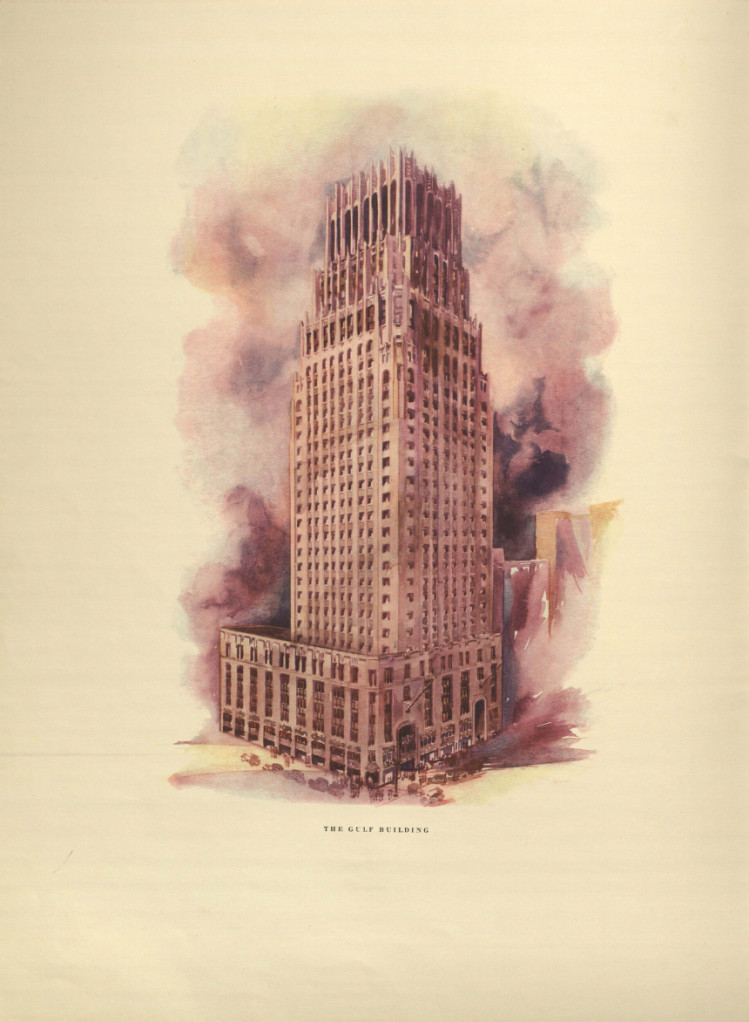
Illustration of the Gulf building, Houston, Texas, 1929

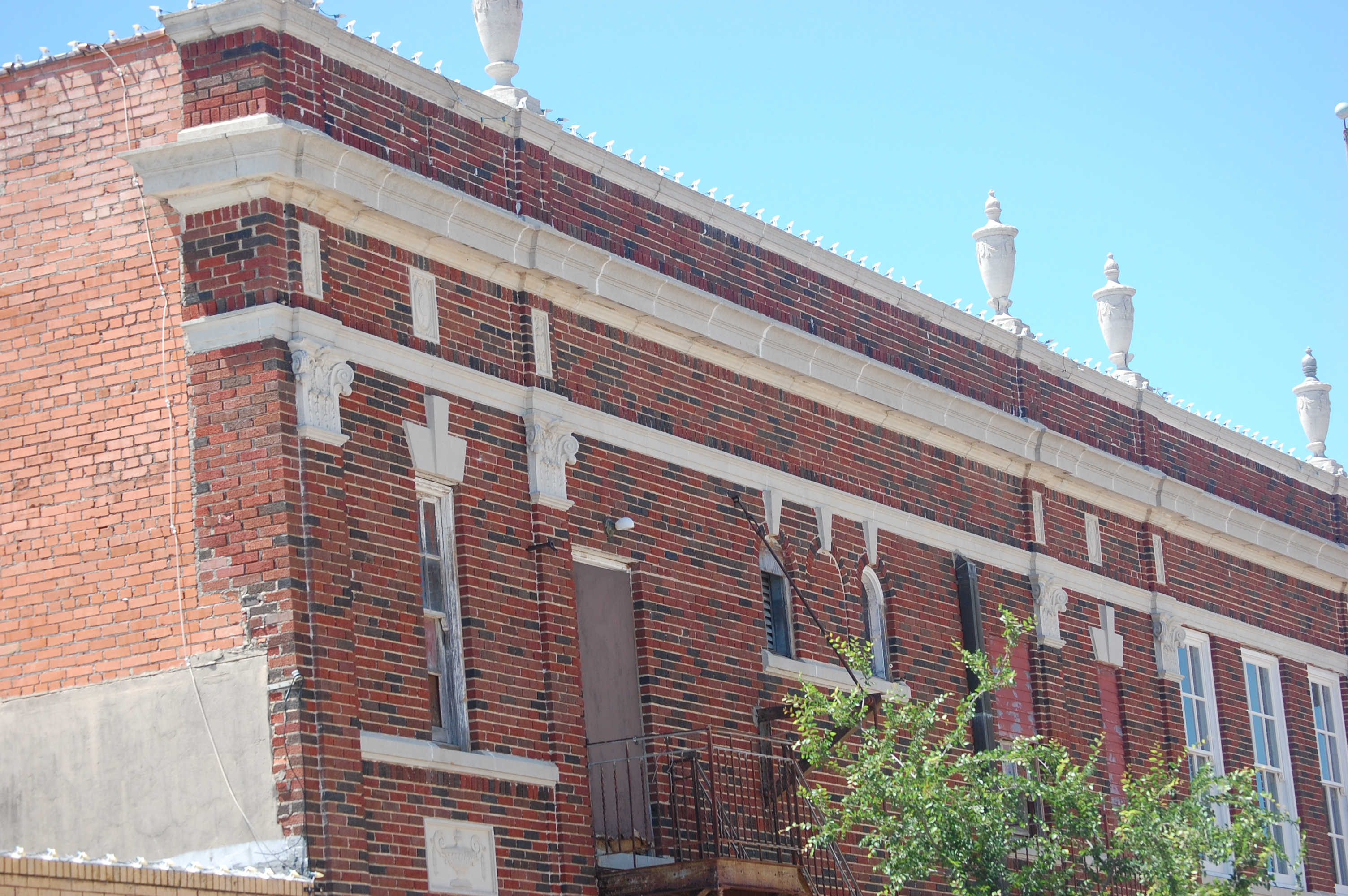
Upper story of the Simon Theatre, Brenham, Texas

Finn's first commission was as project manager for the Rice Hotel, under contract with the firm of Mauran, Russell & Crowell. The owner of the new hotel, Jesse H. Jones, soon after established a collaboration with Finn which would change the face of Downtown Houston. Finn designed two buildings for Jones across the way from the Rice Hotel: the Foster Building, a.k.a. the Houston Chronicle Building, in 1914, and the Rusk Building in 1916. The corner of Texas and Travis was dominated by buildings built by Finn and Jones. In 1926, Finn designed a new seventeen-story wing for the Rice Hotel on behalf of Jones. Finn did architectural work for other commercial clients in the 1920s. He completed State National Bank Building (NHRP-listed) at 412 Main Street in 1923. Jones contracted with Finn to build the Lamar Hotel, where Jones established his new residence. The Jones apartment consumed the whole top floor, though he hired John F. Staub for the interior design. Jones also promised a venue for the 1928 Democratic National Convention without consulting the city of Houston, pledging $200,000 of his own capital. He engaged Finn and Kenneth Franzheim to design and erect the Sam Houston Hall in just four months. The Sam Houston Hall, ostensibly built to be a temporary structure, was larger than Madison Square Garden, and equipped with heavy-duty fans and apertures between the roof and the walls to facilitate air flow. Jones contracted with Finn on another project in downtown Houston, this time with in collaboration with Franzheim and J.E.R. Carpenter, to finish the 37-story, art deco Gulf Building in 1929 — at that time the tallest building in Texas.

Finn designed theaters in Brenham, Dallas, Fort Worth and Houston. Only one of these is still extant (as of October 12, 2017): the Simon Theatre in Brenham, designed in 1925. Finn and Jones collaborated in the fruition of two theaters in Downtown Houston, the Metropolitan in 1926 and the Loew's State in 1927.

Finn established a robust practice for residential architecture, especially in some wealthy Houston subdivisions such as Courtlandt Place, Montrose, and Shadyside. His first work in the Rossmoyne subdivision was the Sterling-Berry House (NHRP-listed), which he completed in 1916 and enhanced with a large portico in 1919. He designed a new house on nearby Montrose Boulevard for Henry H. Dickson, President of the Dickson Wheel Car Company (1917). In the Houston Heights, his early work included the Woodward House (NRHP-listed), which he completed in 1918. In 1920, he designed a home for Earl K. Wharton in the wealthy enclave of Shadyside. Already known in the Courtlandt Place subdivision through his work on the A.S. Cleveland House and James L. Autry House while under the employ of Sanguinet & Staats, Finn moved and remodeled an 1890 Victorian house for Sarah Brashear Jones (Jones-Hunt House, NRHP-listed) in 1920. Other homes in Houston designed by Finn include the Sid Westheimer house (1920), and one for oil mogul, Walter Fondren (1923). He designed the Benjamin Apartments (NRHP-listed), a synthesis of Renaissance Revival style and Arts and Crafts principles. Perhaps Finn's most ambitious residential project was the Ross Sterling House in Bay Ridge Park near Morgan's Point, completed in 1928. He and Robert Smallwood designed a two-and-one-half story house overlooking the Houston Ship Channel with a bay-side portico design based on the south facade of the White House. The next year Finn's office completed a commission for William Lewis Moody III. Smallwood designed the Georgian neo-classical home in Galveston's Cedar Lawn Subdivision, and this neighborhood is now NRHP-listed.

Finn was an architect for the Capitol Lofts, and the L. A. and Adelheid Machemehl House.

Finn designed the fifteen-story People's National Bank Building (NRHP-listed) at Courthouse Square in Tyler, Texas. The brick-and-black-granite-faced art deco skyscraper was finished in 1932, in the middle of the Great Depression. The East Texas oil boom created a demand for office space in Tyler, and Finn designed an expansion which added six stories to a four-story wing in 1936.

== Public service and civic buildings ==
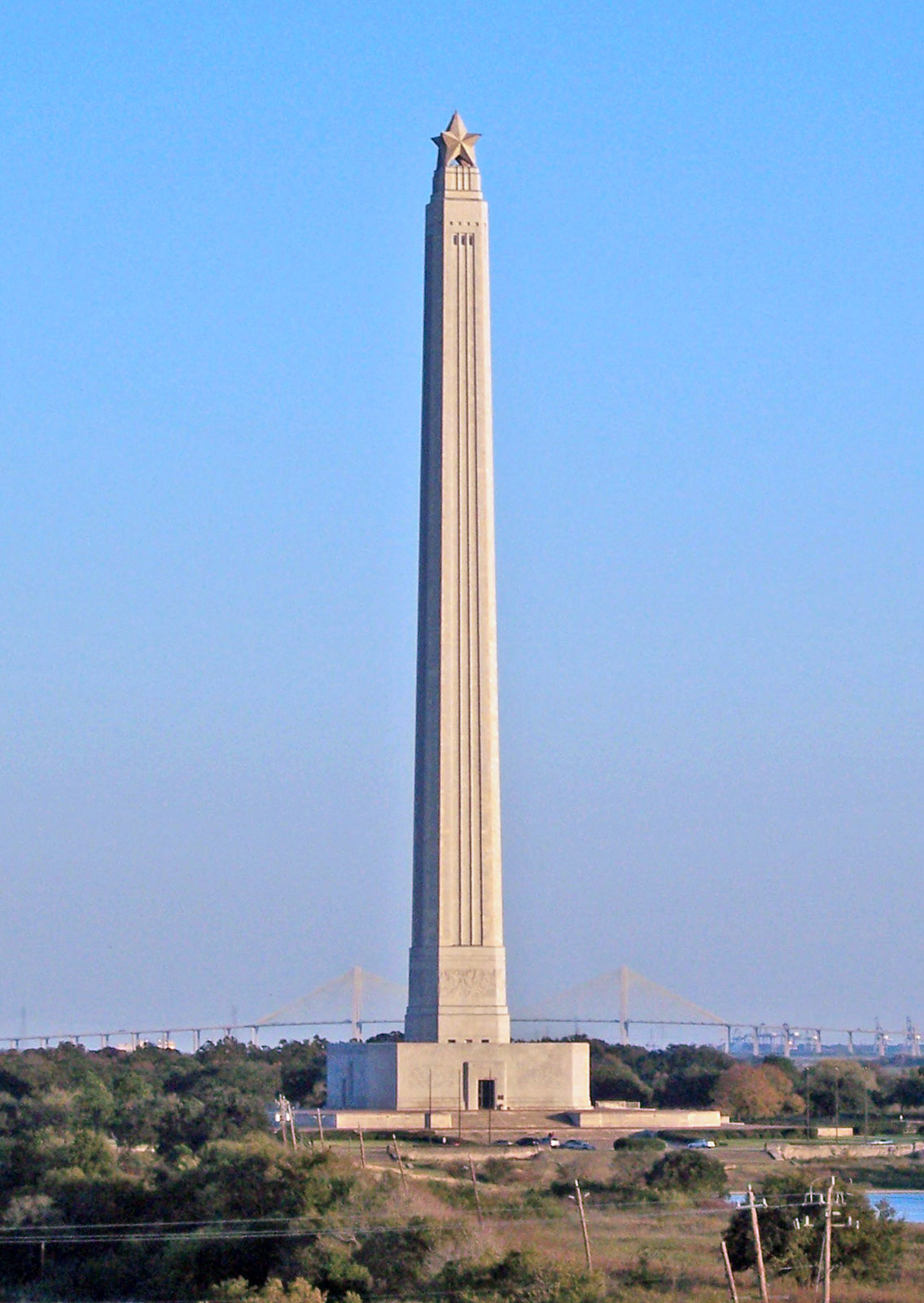
San Jacinto Monument, Baytown, Texas

Finn served as the first Architectural Supervisor for the then recently formed Federal Housing Administration in 1934. He took on this position while Jesse H. Jones was chairing the Reconstruction Finance Corporation during the Franklin D. Roosevelt Administration. During the 1930s, Finn also designed buildings on behalf of the Public Works Administration. These included Jefferson Davis Hospital and the Sam Houston Coliseum in Houston, the U.S. Post Office in Galveston, and the San Jacinto Monument in Baytown, Texas. While no longer reporting directly to the federal government, Finn did contract architecture work for the United States War Department and the Defense Homes Corporation during World War II. His office built the China Springs Air Force Base near Waco, Texas, temporary buildings for Texas A&M, and defense housing in Freeport, Texas. After the war, Finn won a contract to build the United States Naval Hospital at Houston. He designed the Ezekiel W. Cullen Building on the University of Houston campus, an elongated Art Deco building completed in 1950.

== Personal life ==
Finn fathered two sons after marrying Mary Elizabeth Riley in 1909. In addition to membership at St. Paul's Methodist Church, he joined the Arabia Temple Shrine, the local Gray's Lodge York and Scottish Rite Freemason's chapter, the Houston Club, and the Rotary Club.

== Death and legacy ==
Finn died in Houston, on June 26, 1964, aged 80 and is interred at Forest Park Cemetery in Houston. The Houston Metropolitan Research Center is the repository for the Alfred C. Finn Papers.

The JPMorgan Chase building in downtown Houston underwent a major conversion of its lobby and mezzanine into a 20,000 square-foot dining hall. The new facility is called "Finn Hall", in honor of Finn, the building's architect.

== Gallery ==
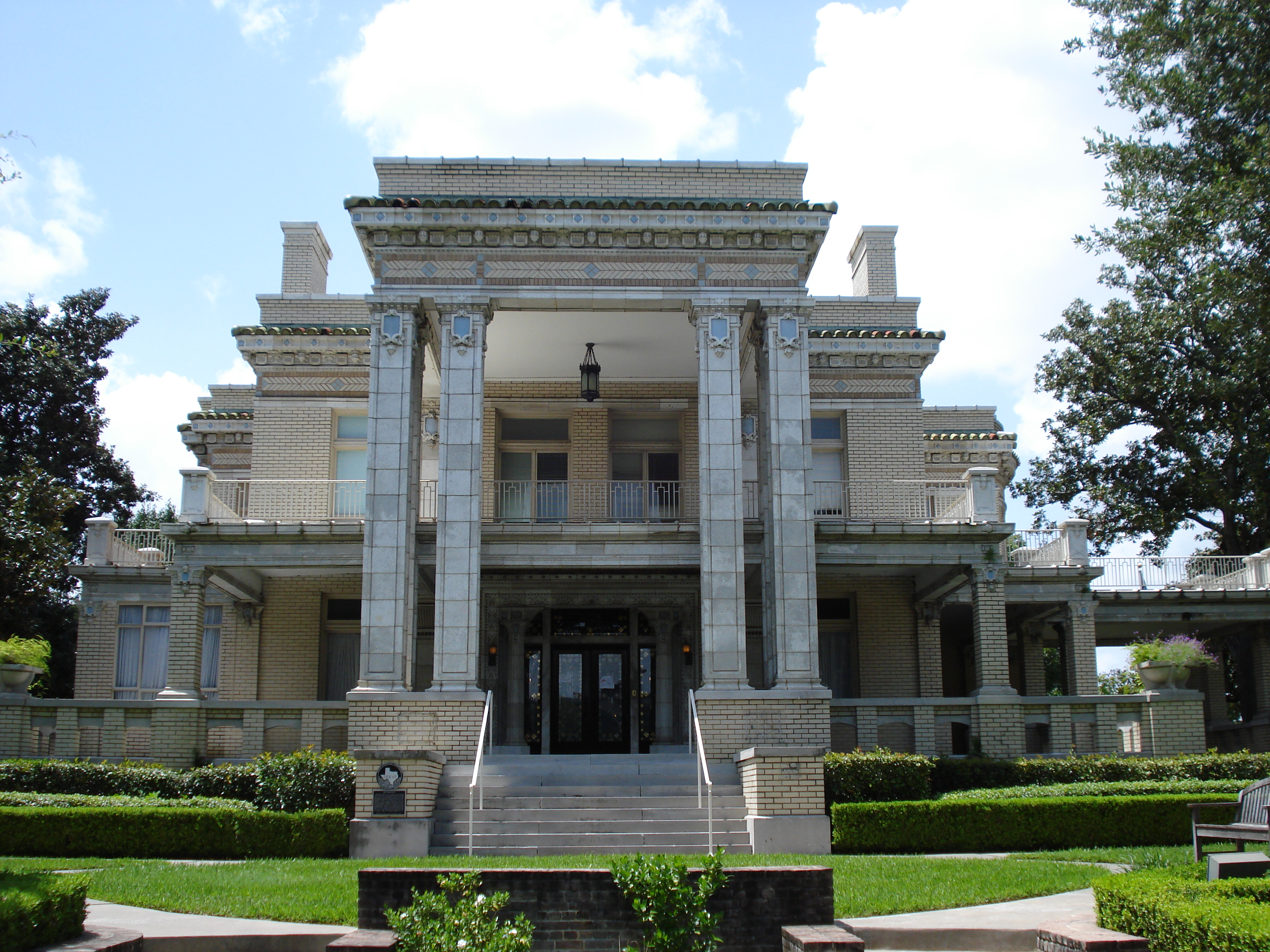
Link-Lee Mansion, Montrose Boulevard, Houston

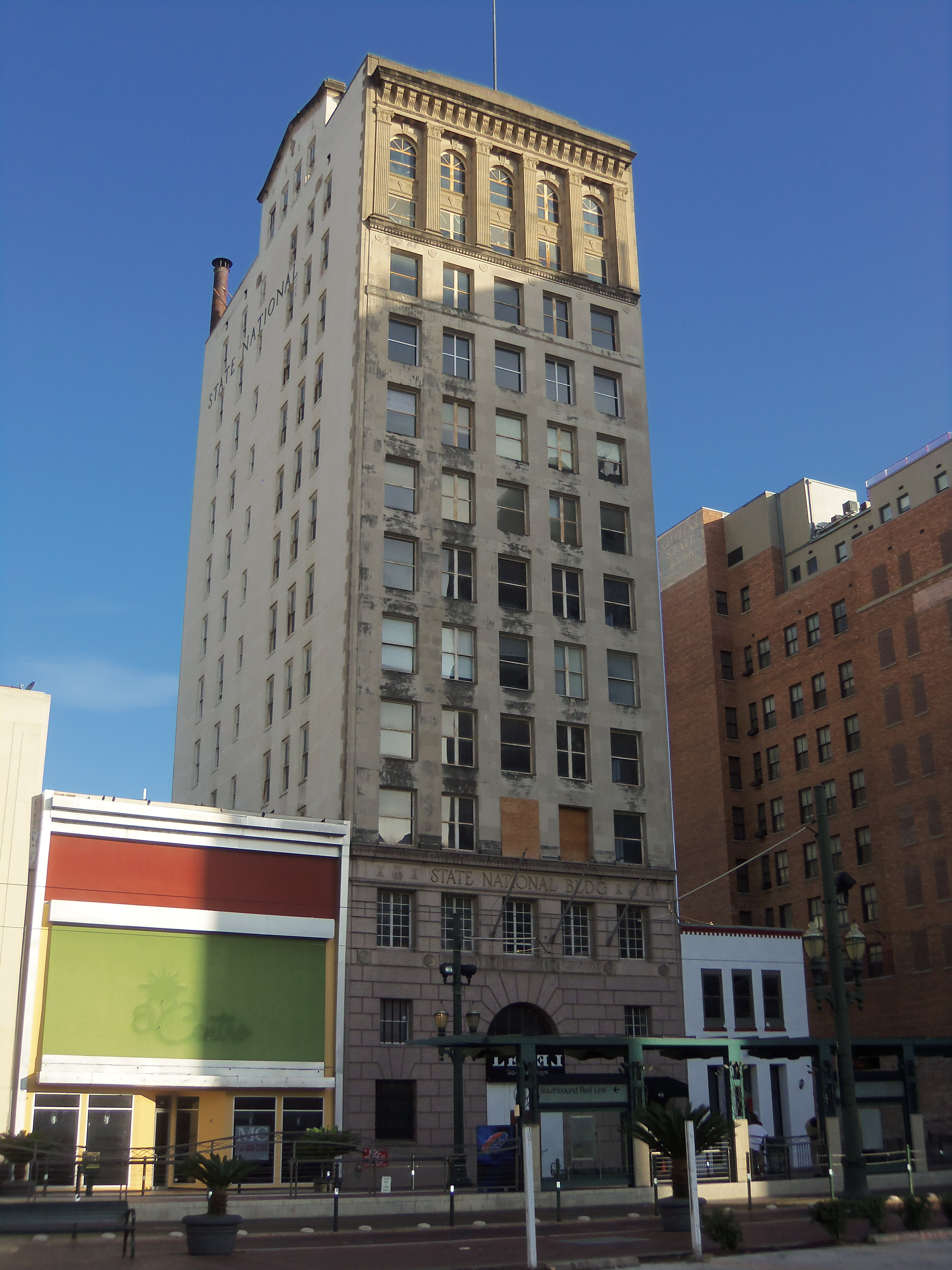
State National Bank Building, 412 Main Street, Houston

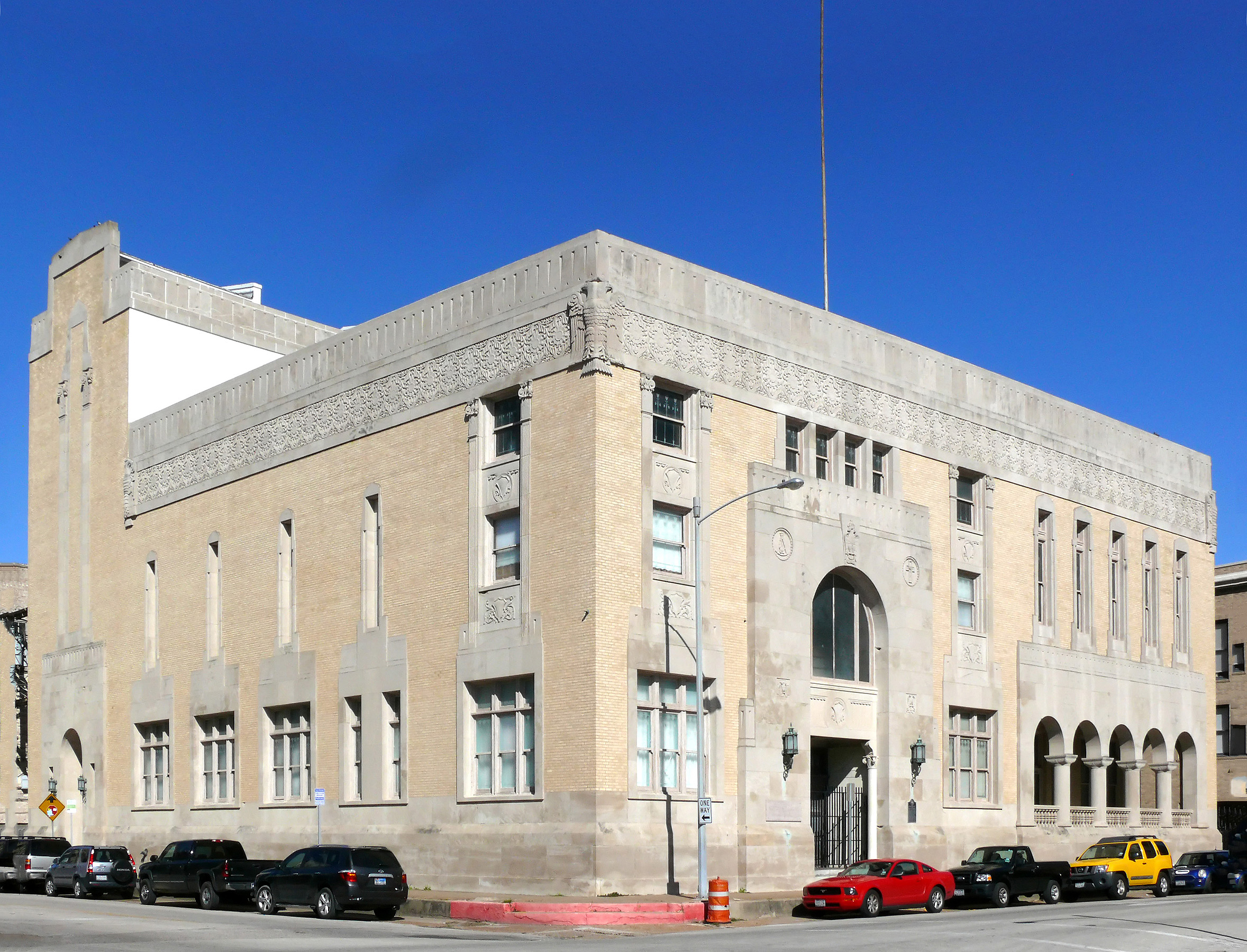
Scottish Rite Temple, Galveston, Texas

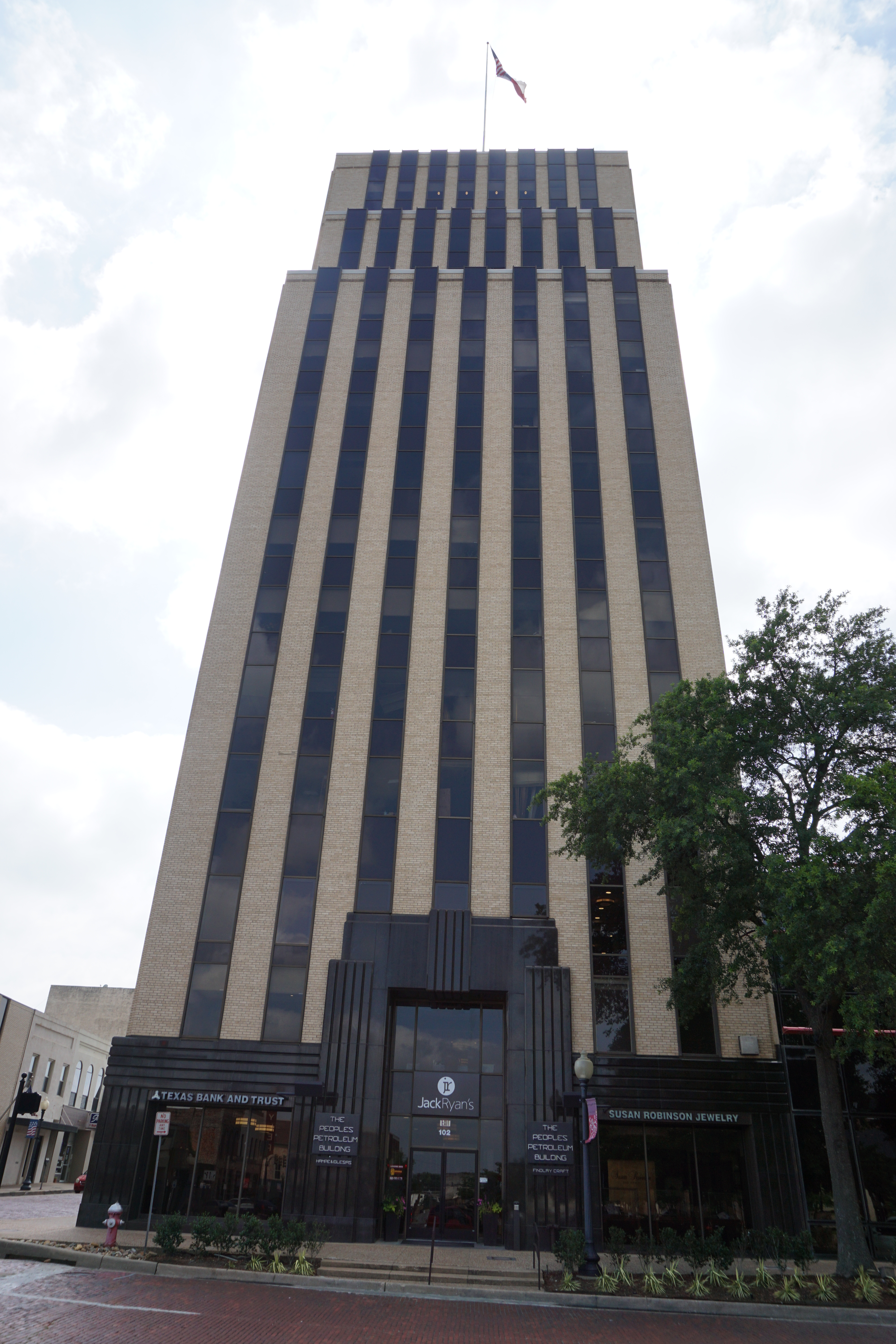
People's National Bank Building, Tyler, Texas

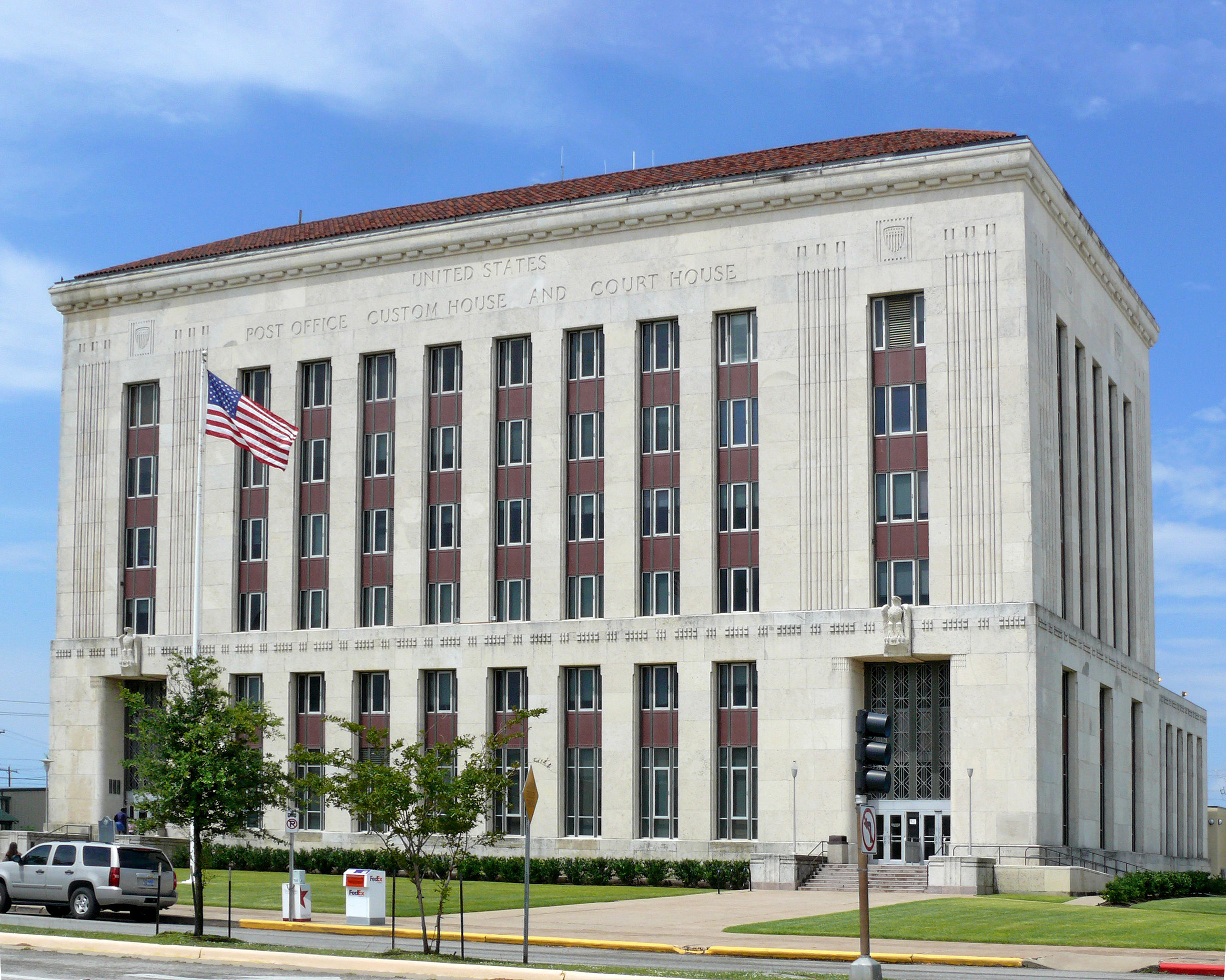
Old US Post Office and Courthouse, Galveston

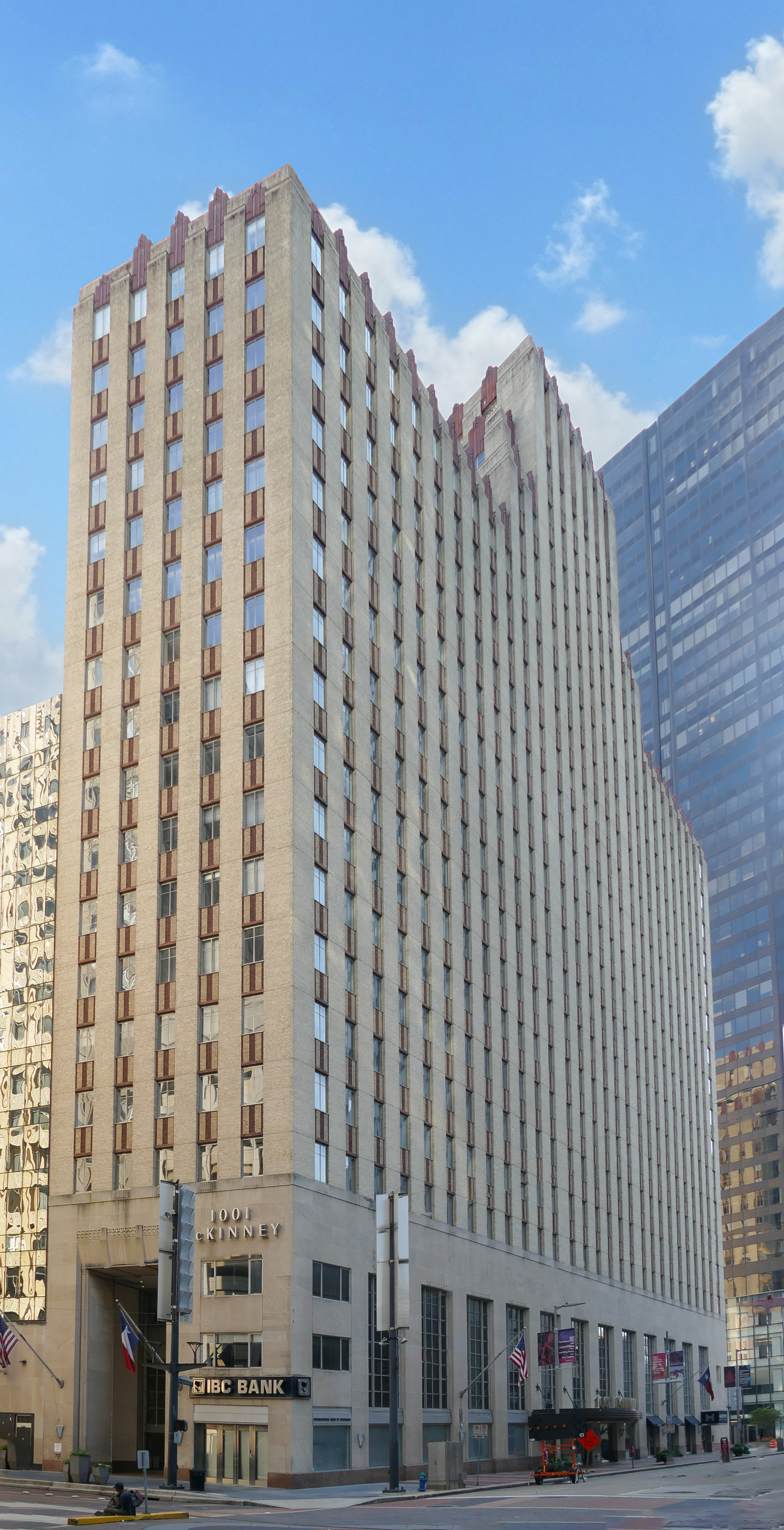
City National Bank Building, Houston

== See also ==
- List of Alfred C. Finn works

== Bibliography ==
- Beasley, Ellen; Fox, Stephen (1996). Galveston Architectural Guidebook. Houston: Rice University Press. ISBN 978-0892633463.
- Bradley, Barrie Scardino (2020). Improbable Metropolis: Houston's Architectural and Urban History. Austin: University of Texas Press. ISBN 978-1477320198.
- Fenberg, Stephen (2011). Unprecedented Power: Jesse Jones, Capitalism, and the Common Good. College Station: Texas A&M University Press.
- Fox, Stephen (2012). AIA Houston Architectural Guide (Third ed.). Houston: American Institute of Architects, Houston Chapter. ISBN 978-0-615-66959-5.
