= Link–Lee House =

Historic house in Texas, United States

- Link-Lee House
- U.S. National Register of Historic Places
- Recorded Texas Historic Landmark
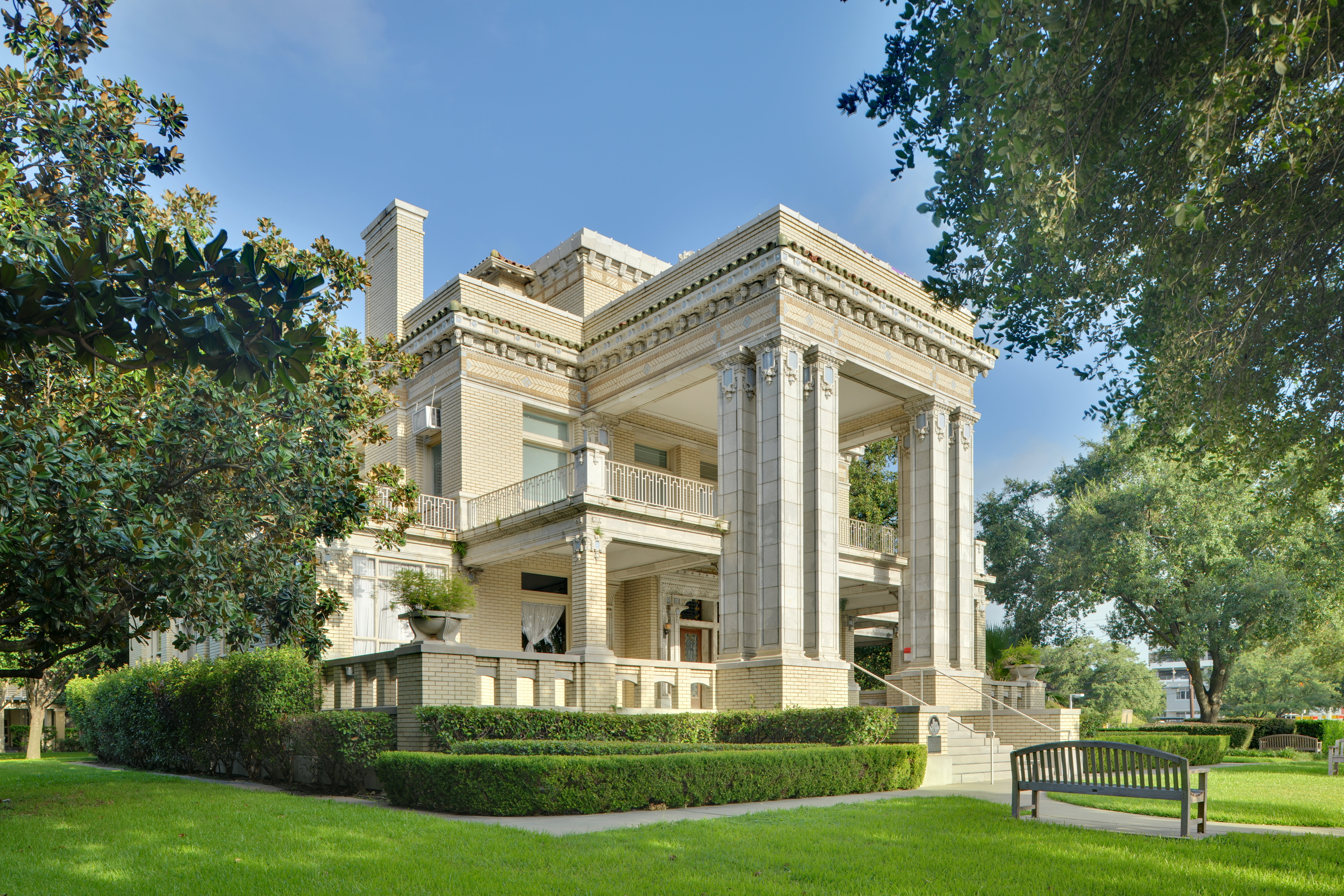

- Location within Texas Location within the United States
- Location: 3800 Montrose; Houston, Texas
- Coordinates: 29°44′16″N 95°23′29″W
- Built: 1912
- NRHP reference No.: 00000751
- RTHL No.: 12632

Significant dates
- Added to NRHP: September 11, 2000
- Designated RTHL: 2001

The Link–Lee House is a large historic home located in Montrose in central Houston, Harris County, in the U.S. state of Texas. It is currently serving as the executive office of the University of St. Thomas. It was added to the National Register of Historic Places listings in Harris County, Texas in 2000, and became a Recorded Texas Historic Landmark in 2001.

== History ==
The Link–Lee House is named for John Wiley Link and Thomas Peter Lee, its first owners. The house is located at the corner of Montrose Boulevard and West Alabama Street, now on the University of St. Thomas campus in Houston. A monumental portico fronts the neoclassical building, which is clad in brick with terra cotta ornamentation.

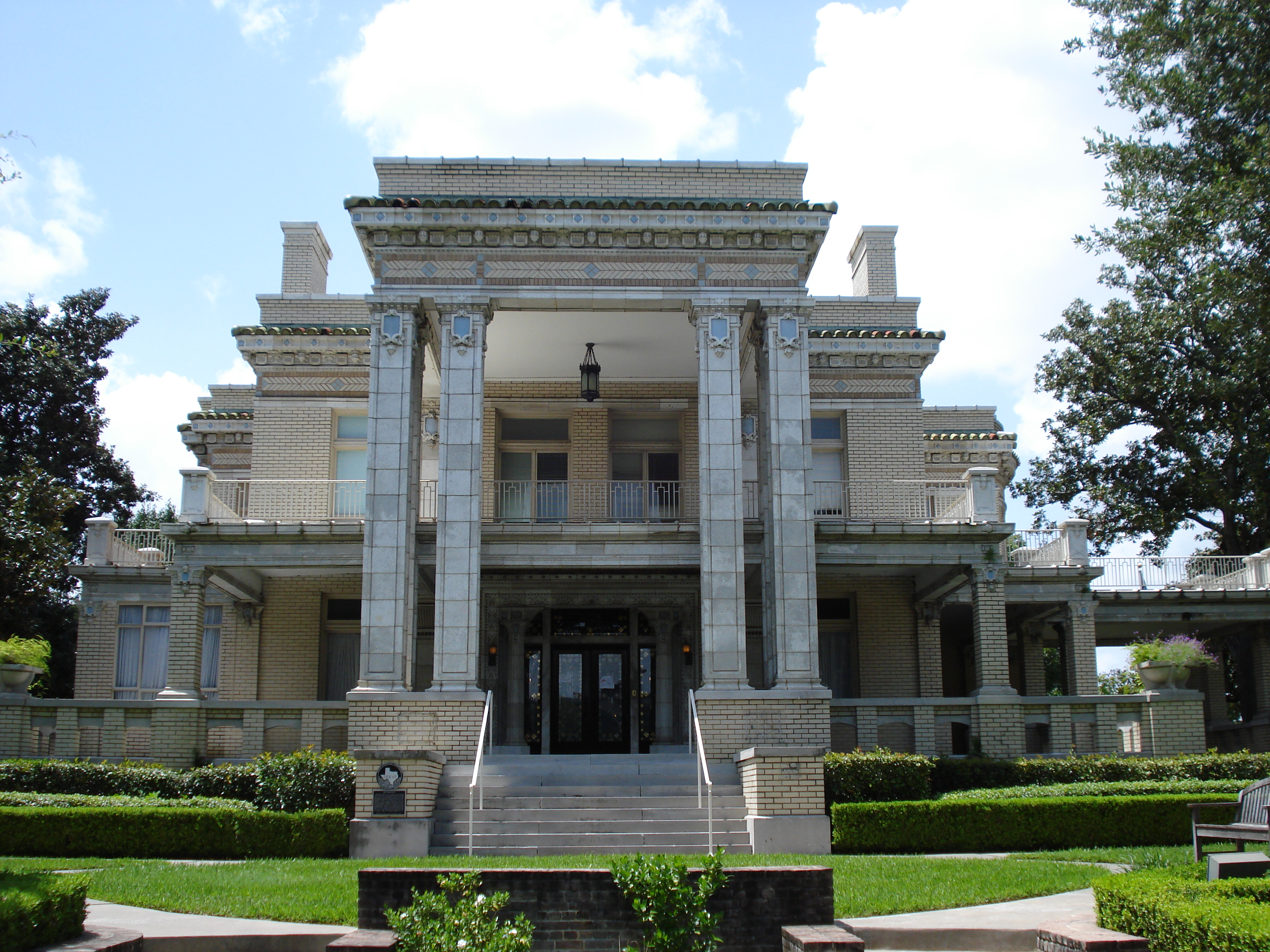
The Link-Lee Mansion is now part of the University of St. Thomas in Houston

=== Link Family ===
John Wiley Link (1866–1933) was born in Gallatin, Texas. He completed his law studies at Baylor University, and joined the Texas bar in 1888. He practiced law in Amarillo and Orange, where he was elected mayor in 1905.

Link accumulated wealth through the lumber business and finance in east Texas. In 1910, he moved to Houston where he anticipated economic growth sparked by its emerging oil industry. In addition to being the founding chairman of The American General Insurance Company and the second president of The Dr. Pepper Company, he established the Houston Land Corporation while amassing several properties totaling 250 acres near the Houston city limits. He set aside a strip land on which he built the first section of Montrose Boulevard, the main street for his upscale residential subdivision. He planned his own home site on Block 41, fronting the newly paved Montrose Boulevard and West Alabama Street. Sanguinet, Staats, and Barnes designed this Link's home, which was built by Young Contracting Company in 1912.

=== Lee Family ===
Thomas Peter Lee (born March 19, 1871) started as an oil field worker in his native West Virginia and Ohio. Just sixteen when he started work, he relocated to Saratoga, Texas in 1903 to work for the Texas Company. In 1914, he co-founded Farmers Petroleum Company and accepted a post as the firm's president.

Lee acquired the house at the end of 1916 for $90,000. Link–Lee House was the largest single-family residence in Houston at the time with over 10,000 square feet. The main floor included a breakfast room, formal dining room, and music room. There was a full basement, a second floor with five bedroom suites, and a third floor ballroom.

After Lee's death, his home remained in the possession of his family until July 9, 1940, when family members, including Mrs. Essie N. Lee, sold the property to the University of St. Thomas for $120,000. At the wishes of all heirs and executors, the college separated the payment into two parts: $6,000 in cash and the remaining $114,000 as a donation, guaranteed by a promissory note dated September 1, 1946, made payable to the William M. Rice Institute for the Advancement of Literature, Science and Art in Houston.

=== University of St. Thomas ===
The home, now referred to as the Link-Lee Mansion, and its surrounding land, became the main building of the University of St. Thomas, which still occupies the site today. Originally the building housed the entire university, it now contains the executive offices of the university. While still mostly intact, the mansion has been adapted to accommodate the offices of the president, vice president for Academic Affairs, Dean of Arts and Sciences, vice president for Institutional Advancement, and Alumni Relations.

The surrounding patio, porch, and yard of the mansion was utilized each October as part of Neewollah, the university's Halloween party. This tradition ended in 2006 with the construction of the Edward P. White Memorial Plaza, which feature a large granite monolith and fountain. The plaza is the last design of famous architect Philip Johnson.

Future plans involve moving the offices out of the mansion and restoring it back to how it looked in 1912. These plans are contingent upon the university purchasing adjacent properties prior to making any such moves.
