= Baldridge House =

- Interactive map of the Baldridge House area

General information
- Type: House
- Location: 5100 Crestline Road, Fort Worth, Texas, United States
- Coordinates: 32°44′25″N 97°23′51″W
- Construction started: 1910
- Completed: 1913
- Client: Earl Baldridge

Design and construction
- Architect: Sanguinet & Staats

The Baldridge House is a historic three-story mansion in Fort Worth, Texas, U.S. It was built from 1910 to 1913 for Earl Baldridge, a cattleman and rancher who later became a banker, and his wife Florence. It was designed by Sanguinet & Staats. It was purchased by Paun Peters, the president of the Western Production Company, in 2007. It was listed for sale for $8 million in 2017.

The house has been listed as a Texas Historic Landmark by the Texas Historical Commission since 1978. Its historic marker reads

The Balridge House. This house was part of the original Chamberlain–Arlington Heights development of the 1890s. Earl and Florence Baldridge built this elegant residence in 1910–13. Designed by the architectural firm of Sanguinet & Staats, it was a showplace of the time. Massive limestone columns line the facade. Carved oak woodwork decorates the interior. The home was occupied for many years by W. C. Stonestreet, a prominent Fort Worth clothier. Recorded Texas Historic Landmark—1978.
