= Burk Burnett Building =

- U.S. National Register of Historic Places
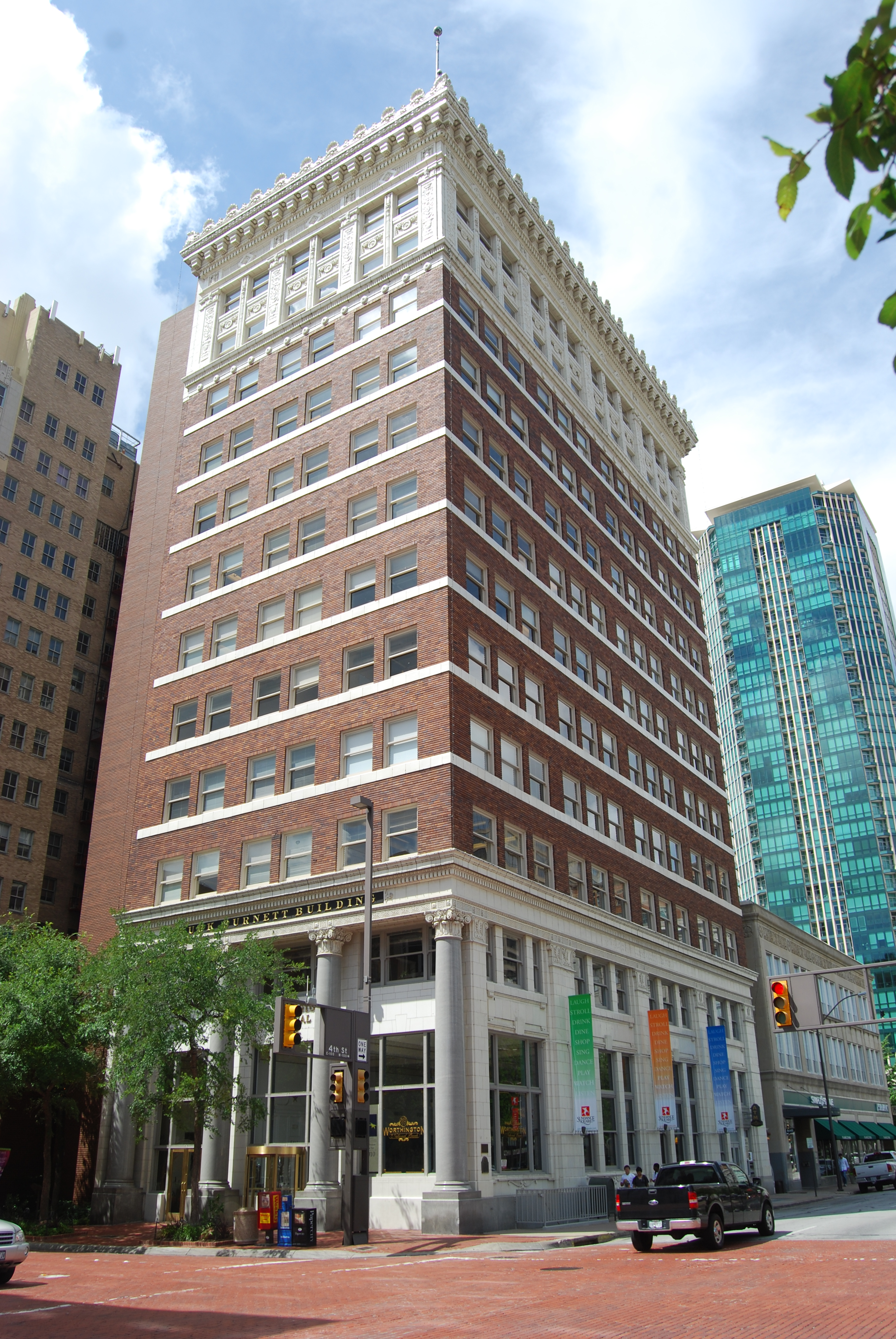
- Burk Burnett Building in 2010

- Location within Texas Location within the United States
- Location: 500-502 Main Street, Fort Worth, Texas
- Coordinates: 32°45′15″N 97°19′51″W
- Area: less than one acre
- Built: 1914
- Built by: Buchanan & Gilder
- Architect: Sanguinet & Staats
- Architectural style: Classical Revival, Neo-Classical Revival
- NRHP reference No.: 80004151
- Added to NRHP: November 12, 1980

The Burk Burnett Building is a building in downtown Fort Worth, Texas, located in Sundance Square. It has twelve floors and is 156 feet (48 m) high. The ground floor of the building is occupied by Worthington National Bank. The Burk Burnett Building has been listed on National Register of Historic Places since November 12, 1980.

== History ==
The Burk Burnett Building was designed by Sanguinet & Staats and built in 1914. At the time of construction, it was the tallest building of the city and became the first skyscraper in Fort Worth. It was originally occupied by the State National Bank. The bank was declared bankrupt in 1915, and the building was bought by Samuel Burk Burnett and renamed. The building underwent renovations in 1980 and 1984. In particular, in 1984 the old bank lobby was restored. In 2005, the Worthington National Bank restored the lobby, hiring for this an artist, Xiang Xian.

== Architecture ==
The Burk Burnett Building was the last of three buildings constructed by Sanguinet & Staats and similar in design. The first two were the ALICO Building in Waco (1911) and the Rand Building in San Antonio (1913). It is built in a neoclassical style. The lower part of the building (two floors) is made of white terracotta and of granite columns, the middle part (eight floors) is of red brick with terracotta layers separating floors, and the top part (two floors) is decorated white terracotta.

In 1919, the building in Fort Worth currently known as Hilton Fort Worth Hotel was specifically constructed by Sanguinet & Staats to resemble the Burk Burnett Building.

== See also ==
- National Register of Historic Places listings in Tarrant County, Texas
