= IA Clarington Investments =

Canadian investment management firm

IA Clarington Investments Inc.
- Company type: Private (wholly owned subsidiary of iA Financial Group)
- Industry: Financial services
- Founded: 1996; 30 years ago
- Founder: Terry Stone, Adrian Brouwers and Salvatore Tino
- Headquarters: Toronto, Canada
- Key people: Catherine Milum, Chief Executive Officer; Abrar Nantel, Vice-President, Finance & Chief Financial Officer; Dolores Di Felice, Vice-President, Chief Legal Counsel
- Products: Mutual funds, Portfolio solutions Exchange-traded funds Socially responsible investments
- AUM: ▲$22 billion (as at December 31, 2024)
- Number of employees: 200 (2020)
- Website: iaclarington.com

IA Clarington Investments is a Canadian Investment management company catering to the Canadian retail market. A wholly owned subsidiary of iA Financial Group (TSX: IFG), the company sells various products, including mutual funds, portfolios, exchange-traded series of mutual funds, segregated funds and socially responsible investments. Except for its exchange-traded series, iA Clarington products can only be purchased through licensed, third-party financial advisors.

== History ==
The company was founded in 1996 by Terry Stone, Adrian Brouwers and Salvatore Tino as Clarington Corporation, and operated principally through its wholly owned subsidiary, ClaringtonFunds Inc. In December 2003, Clarington Corporation went public. In 2005, it was acquired by iA Financial Group, which rebranded the Clarington funds, along with existing Industrial Alliance mandates, under the iA Clarington Investments name.

== List of Portfolio Managers ==
iA Clarington funds are managed by either in-house portfolio managers or external sub-advisors. The following list is as at January 31, 2025:

- iA Global Asset Management Inc.
- Loomis, Sayles & Company, L.P.
- QV Investors Inc.
- Vancity Investment Management Ltd.
- Agile Investments Management LLC

== See also ==
- iA Financial Group
- Mutual fund
- Segregated fund
