= William J. Bryce House =

Historic house in Texas, United States

- U.S. National Register of Historic Places
- Recorded Texas Historic Landmark
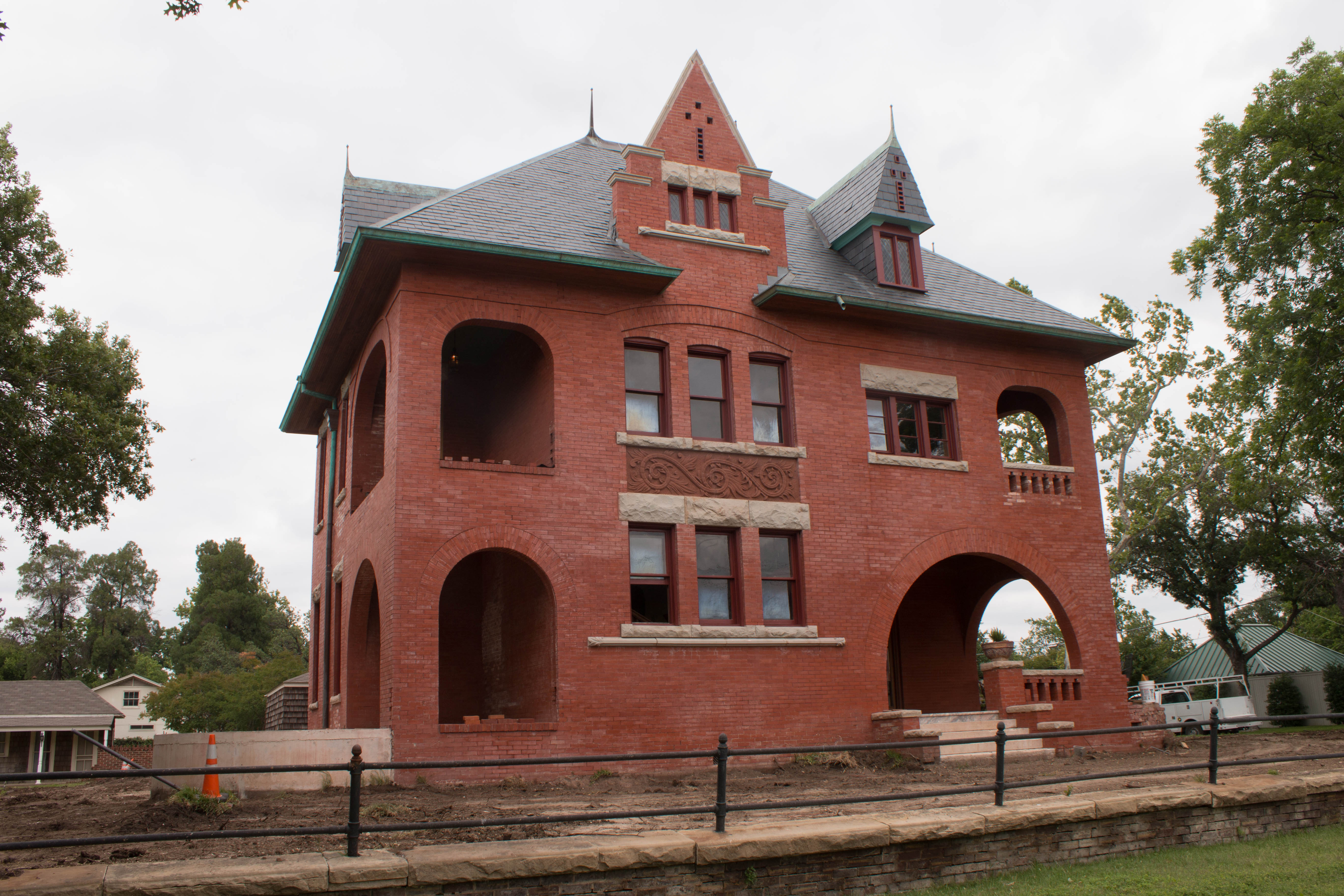
- Bryce House in 2016

- Location within Texas Location within the United States
- Location: 4900 Bryce Ave., Fort Worth, Texas
- Coordinates: 32°44′23″N 97°23′35″W
- Area: less than one acre
- Built: 1893
- Built by: William J. Bryce
- Architect: Marshall Sanguinet
- Architectural style: Renaissance, French Renaissance
- NRHP reference No.: 84001965
- RTHL No.: 1556

Significant dates
- Added to NRHP: March 1, 1984
- Designated RTHL: 1983

The William J. Bryce House, known as Fairview, is located on 4900 Bryce Avenue in Fort Worth, in the U.S. state of Texas.

William J. Bryce was born in Scotland in 1861. He immigrated to the United States, and in 1883 settled in Fort Worth. As a brickmason by training, he began working in the building trades in Fort Worth, and in 1907 established the Bryce Building Company. In 1925, he was elected to the city council; two years later, he was elected mayor, and held the office until his resignation in 1933, necessitated by his wife's failing health. Bryce died in 1944.

Bryce built the Fairview house in the Arlington Heights neighborhood of Fort Worth in 1893, after a design by Fort Worth architectural firm Messer, Sanguinet, and Messer. Following the firm's dissolution in 1895, design partner Marshall Sanguinet established a new firm in partnership with engineer Carl Staats; at about this time, he achieved the status of "the city's preeminent architect".

Fairview is a two-story masonry house that faces south on a large lot. Its design is a manifestation of the interest in French Renaissance architecture, particularly in chateaux, among late-19th-century American architects. The building is for the most part square in plan, with a steeply pitched slate hip roof and gabled dormers. A smaller wing extends to the rear, and a carriage house of similar design stands to the rear.

The house was altered somewhat by its second owner, in the 1940s, but retained much of its original character. It was listed as a Recorded Texas Historic Landmark in 1983, and added to the National Register of Historic Places in 1984.

== See also ==
- National Register of Historic Places listings in Tarrant County, Texas
- Recorded Texas Historic Landmarks in Tarrant County
