= Our Lady of Victory Academy (Fort Worth, Texas) =

- U.S. National Register of Historic Places
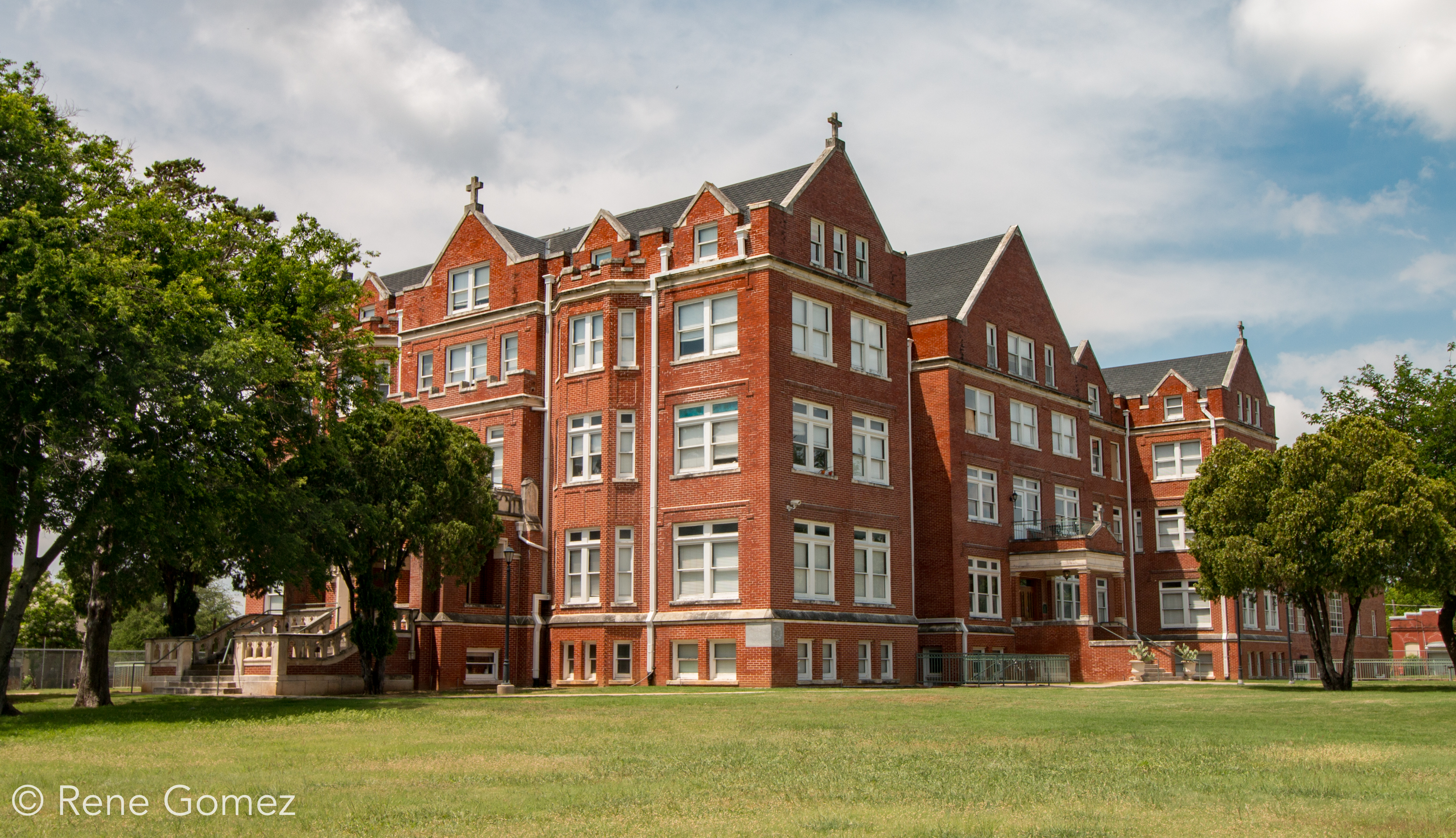
- Our Lady of Victory Academy in 2018

- Location within Texas Location within the United States
- Location: 801 Shaw St., Fort Worth, Texas
- Coordinates: 32°42′11″N 97°19′59″W
- Area: 3 acres (1.2 ha)
- Built: 1910
- Architect: Sanguinet & Staats, et al.
- Architectural style: Late Gothic Revival
- NRHP reference No.: 04000886
- Added to NRHP: August 20, 2004

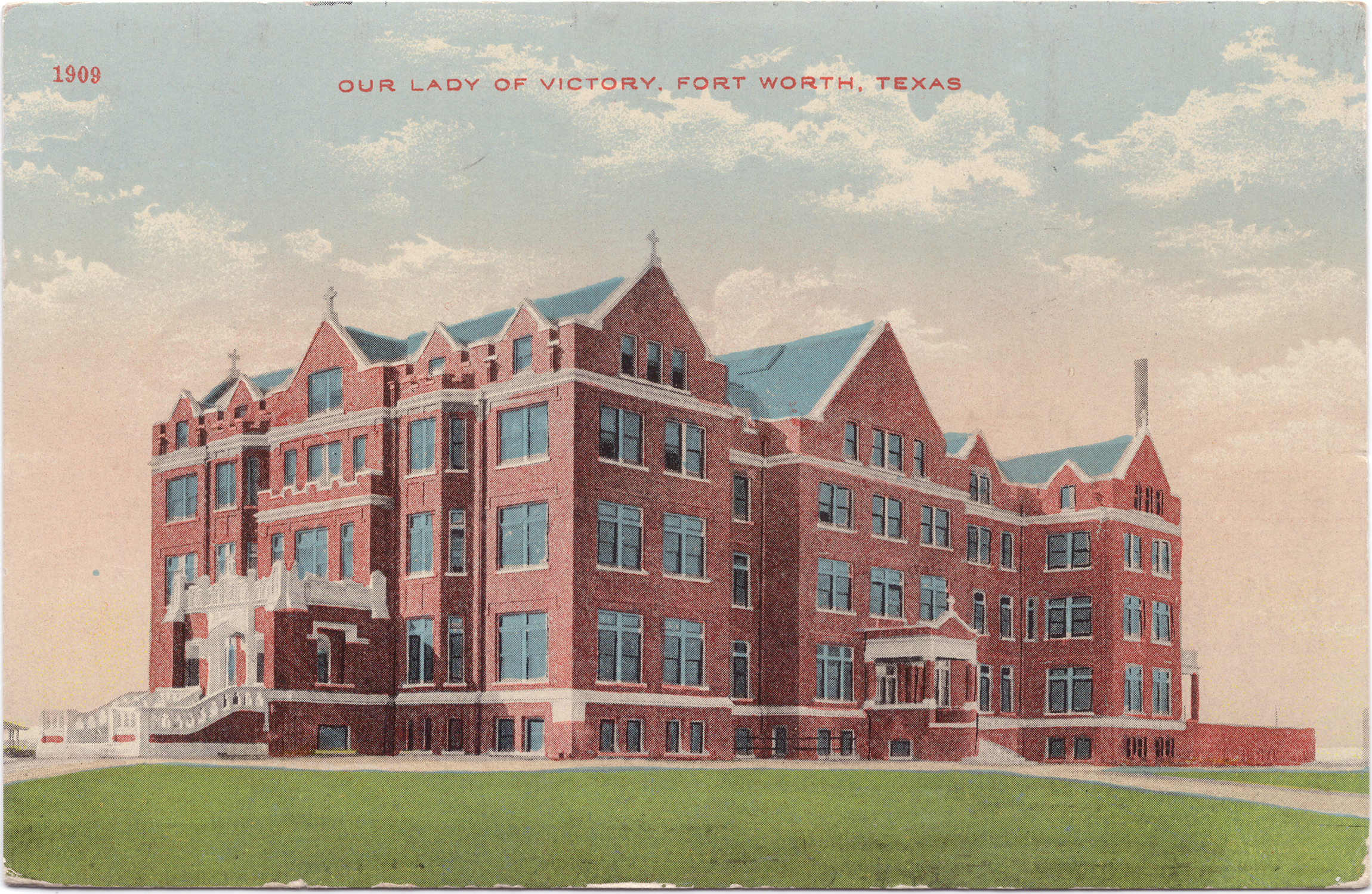
Postcard of Our Lady of Victory Academy, 1909

Our Lady of Victory Academy is located on 801 Shaw Street in Fort Worth, Texas. Ground for the school was broken on March 25, 1909. The cornerstone was laid later that year. The Fort Worth architectural firm Sanguinet and Staats designed the building. The five-story building was constructed at a cost of $200.000. The building welcomed 31 boarders and 41 day pupils on September 12, 1910. The school offered classes on elocution, grammar, business, art and music.

In 1930s, a junior college was constructed as a separate building on the campus grounds. In the 1980s, the upkeep required for the larger academy was deemed by the local nunnery to be too difficult and costly. The nunnery relocated their cloister to a smaller building on the northwest end of the campus. Following this transition, high school students were moved to Nolan Catholic High School, while elementary and middle school students were relocated to the junior college building. Our Lady of Victory Academy continued to operate as a private elementary and middle school for several decades.

In 2004, the original Our Lady of Victory Academy was renovated as the Victory Arts Center, redesigned as a residential and artist studio. The building remains as a residential apartment complex.

On February 23, 2021, the Sisters of Saint Mary of Namur chose to cease education at the private school, without the consultation of the Roman Catholic Diocese of Fort Worth. The Our Lady of Victory Catholic School building was closed. The school building remains unused.

== See also ==
- National Register of Historic Places listings in Tarrant County, Texas
- Nolan Catholic High School
- Roman Catholic Diocese of Fort Worth
