= Great Jones Building =

Building in Texas, United States

Coordinates: 29.7592°N 95.3635°W

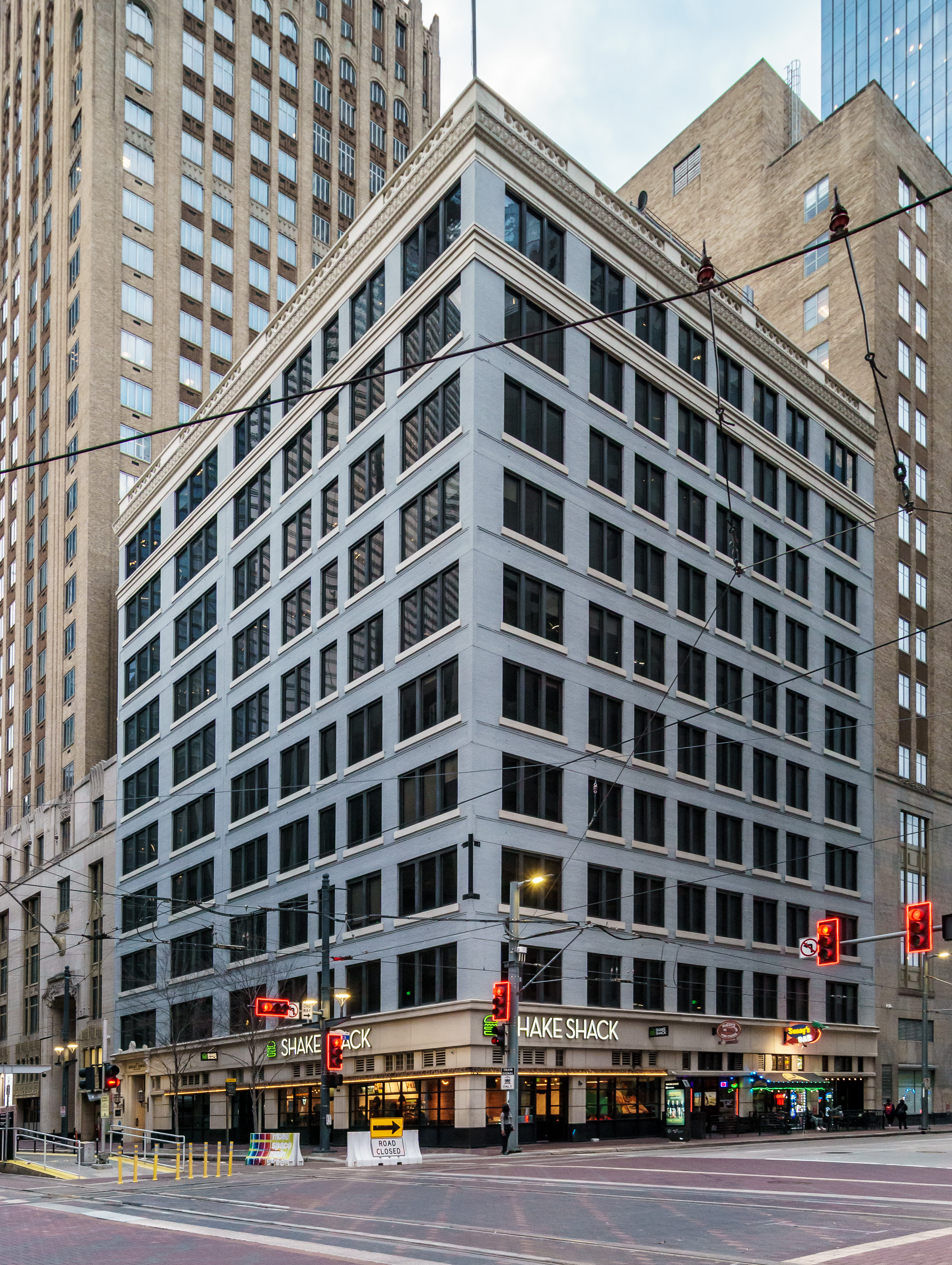
Great Jones Building

The Great Jones Building is a building in Downtown Houston at the intersection of Capitol Street and Main Street.

The Great Jones Building opened in 1908. Originally it housed the offices of the Texas Company, which later became Texaco. Jim Parsons of the Greater Houston Preservation Alliance (GHPA) believes that Sanguinet & Staats, a Fort Worth, Texas firm, may have designed the building. In 1922, the building received an expansion. When Texaco relocated to a building on San Jacinto Street, the building became the Bankers Mortgage Building. The GHPA stated that Jesse H. Jones kept an office in what is now known as the Great Jones Building while the Gulf Building was being constructed. In the 2000s Spire Realty Group decided to preserve the structure, and in 2003 the GHPA gave Spire the "Good Brick Award." During that period the building received its current name, the "Great Jones Building."
