= Eighth Avenue Historic District =

Historic district in Texas, United States

- U.S. National Register of Historic Places
- U.S. Historic district
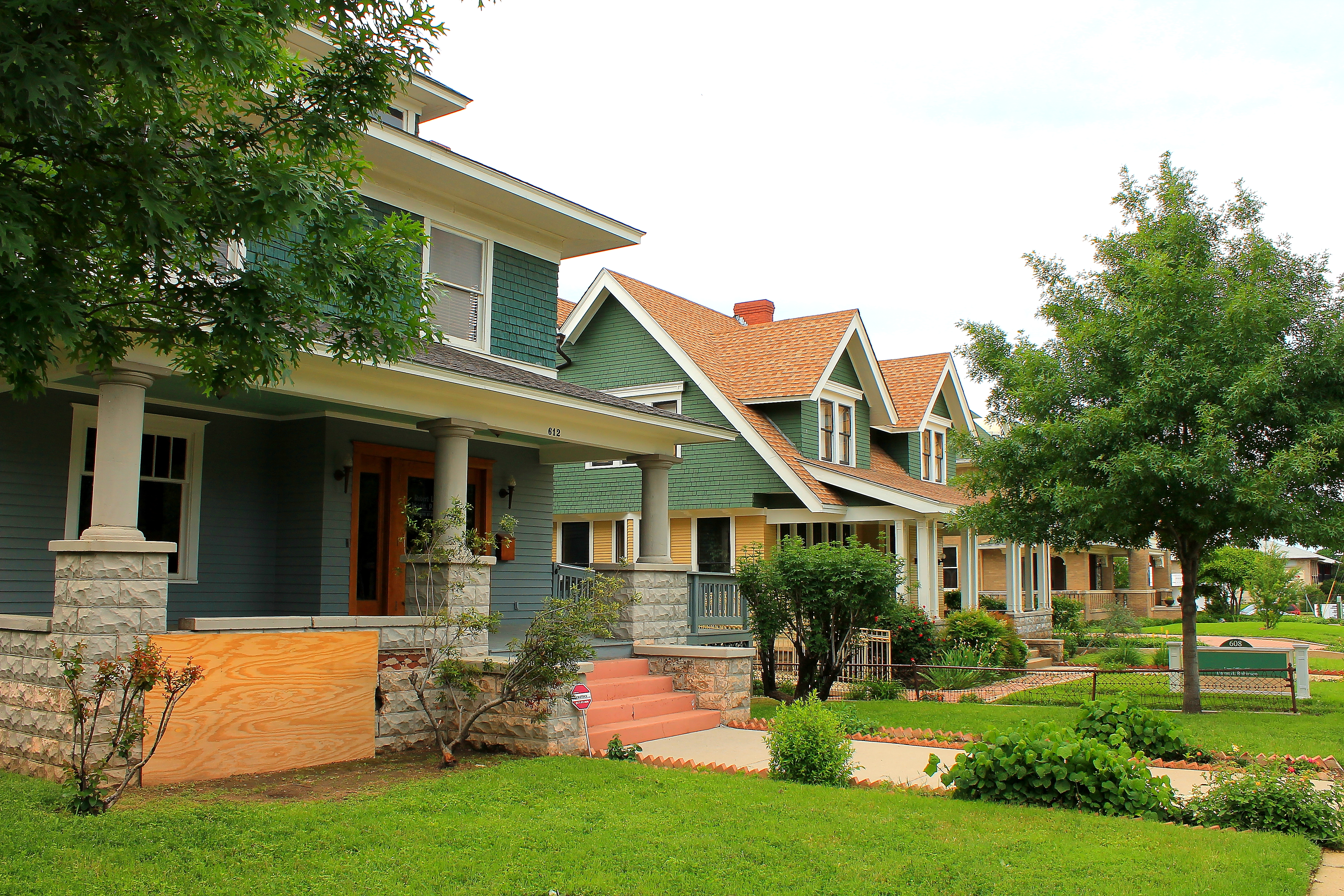
- Residential row in 2012

- Location within Texas Location within the United States
- Location: Bounded by 8th Ave., Pennsylvania Ave., 9th Ave., and Pruitt St., Fort Worth, Texas
- Coordinates: 32°44′24″N 97°20′39″W
- Area: 1.2 acres (0.49 ha)
- Architect: Sanguinet & Staats, Paul Koeppe
- Architectural style: Prairie School, Bungalow, Dutch Revival
- NRHP reference No.: 06001065
- Added to NRHP: 21 November 2006

The Eighth Avenue Historic District is located in Fort Worth, Texas. It was added to the National Register on November 26, 2006.

== Photo gallery ==
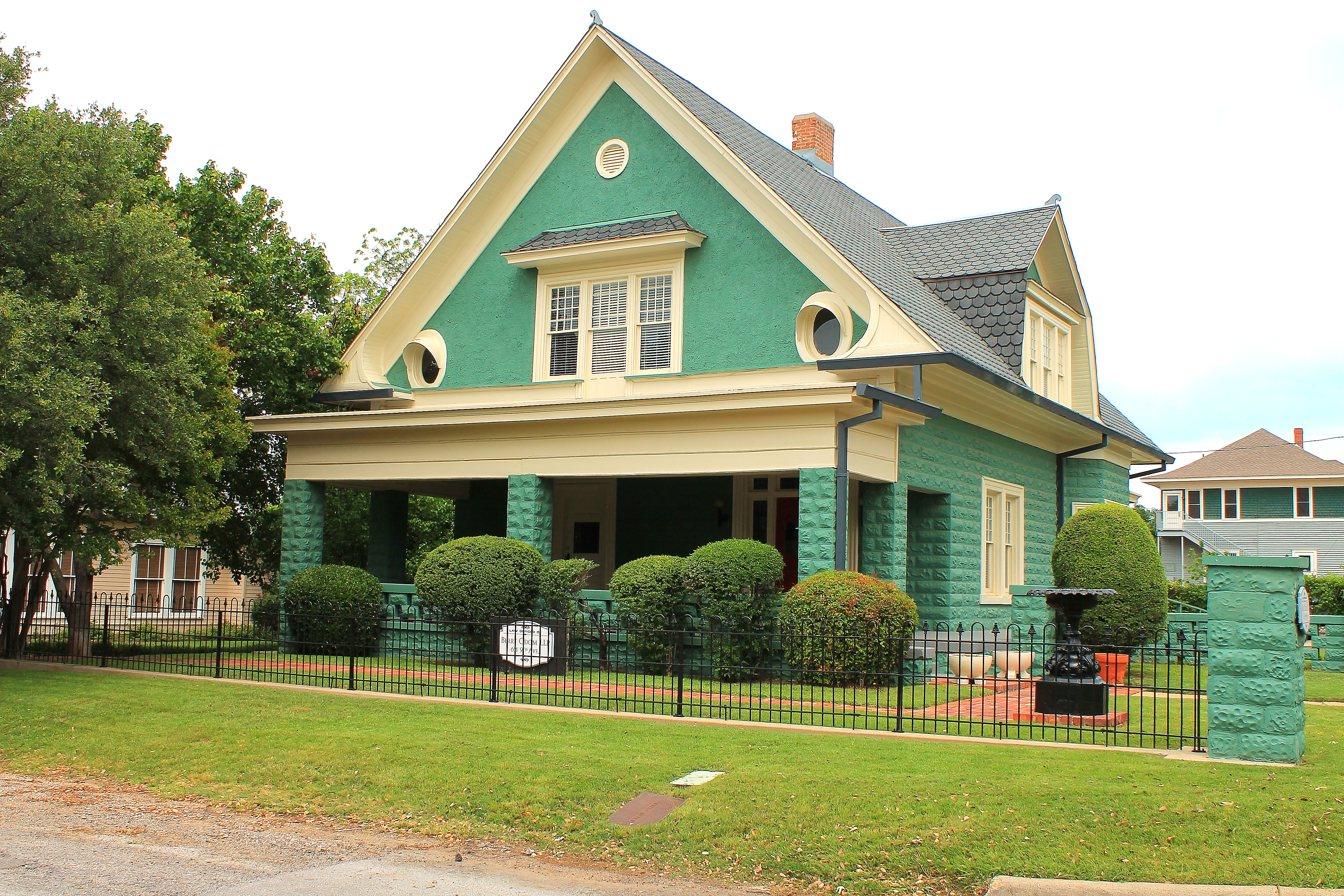

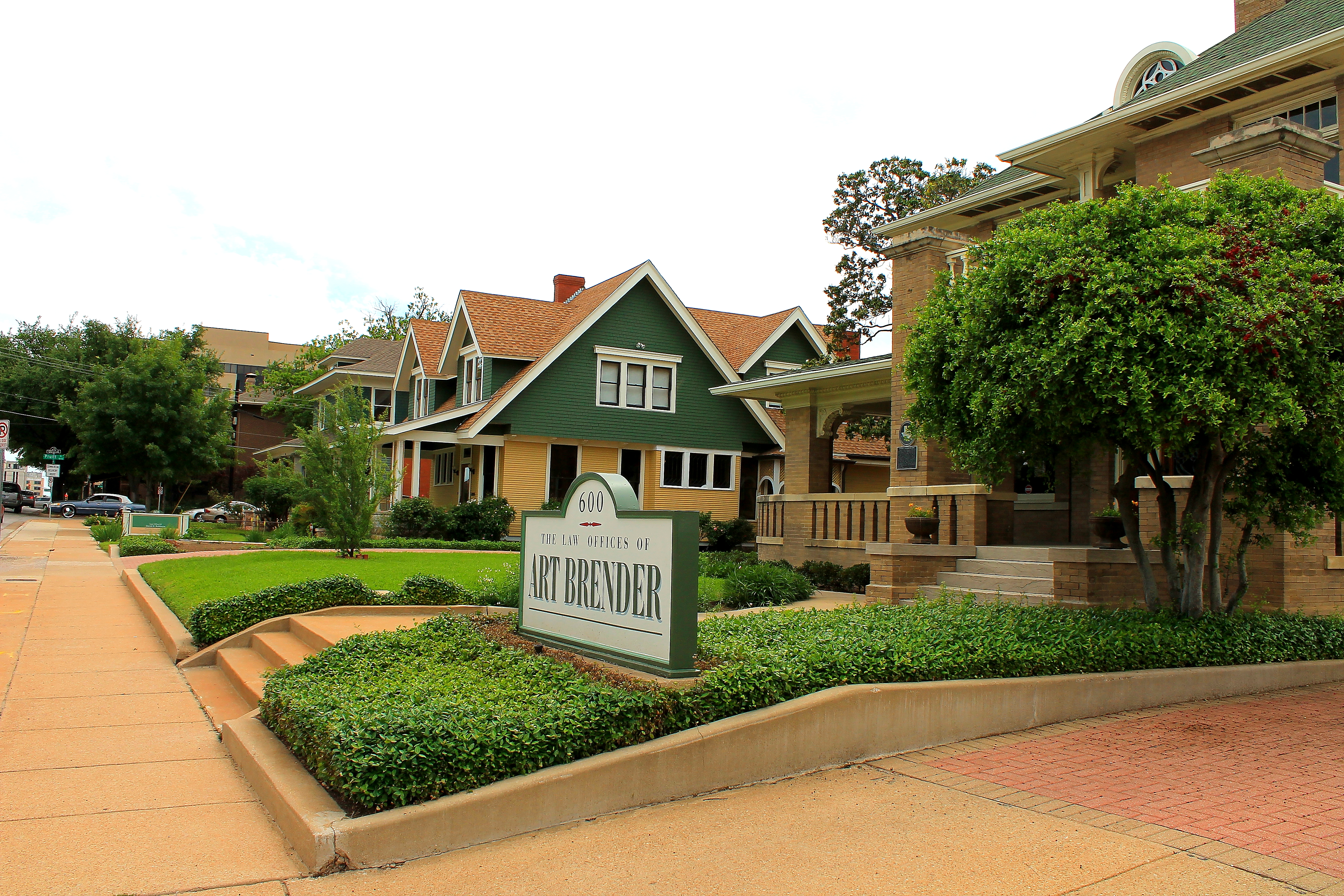

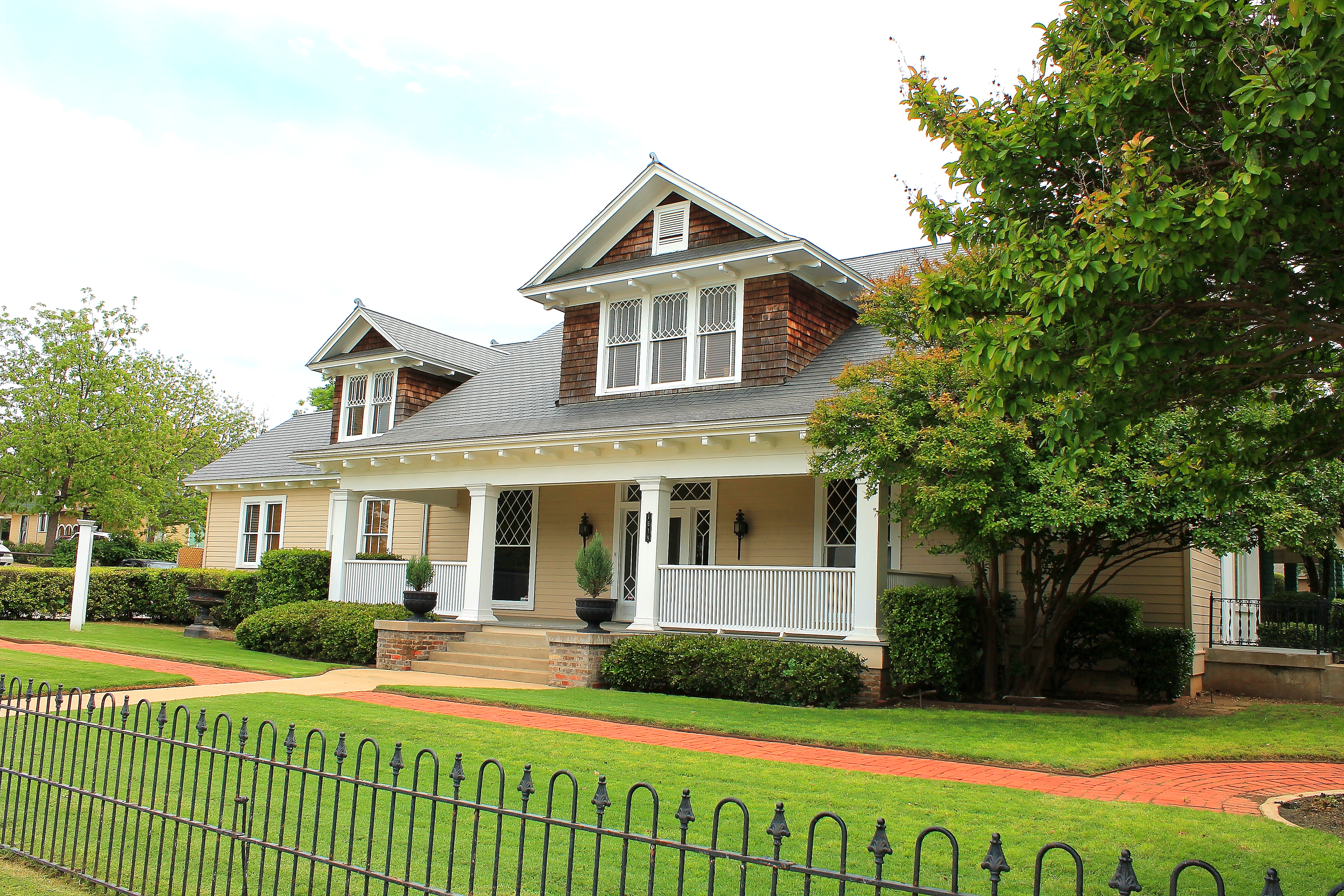

== See also ==
- Historic preservation
- National Register of Historic Places listings in Tarrant County, Texas
- Recorded Texas Historic Landmarks in Tarrant County
