= Neewollah =

Annual festival in Independence, Kansas

Coordinates: 37°13′33.1284″N 95°43′27.7314″W

Neewollah Festival
- Genre: Festival
- Begins: 23 October 2026
- Ends: 31 October 2026
- Frequency: Yearly, last week of October
- Locations: Penn, Independence, Kansas 67301
- Years active: 107
- Inaugurated: 31 October 1919
- Most recent: 25 October 2025
- Website: Neewollah Festival Website

Neewollah Festival (Halloween spelled backwards) is an annual festival during the last week of October in Independence, Kansas.

== History ==
Neewollah began in 1919, as an effort to provide positive activities for kids of all ages in place of the typical Halloween pranks that occurred in the community of Independence, Kansas. In the beginning, the events centered on parades, morning, afternoon, and night on October 31. The parades consisted mainly of decorated cars and carriages. Queens and princesses from area festivals rode in the parades, along with a Queen Neelah who was selected based on votes bought at a penny each. The Great Depression and World War II interrupted the Neewollah celebration but in 1958 four businessmen revived and elaborated on the Neewollah theme bringing it back as a 3-day celebration.

Today, Neewollah is one of the largest annual celebrations in Kansas. The city of Independence grows from a town of just under 8600 inhabitants to over 60,000 in the final days of the now 10-day celebration. Today's celebration now includes 3 parades: a Doo Dah Parade (adult Kiddie Parade), a Kiddies Parade, and a Grand Parade. A chili Cook-off, a hometown musical, and queen's pageant also add to the festival activities. The main downtown is filled with 30 plus food vendors, a large carnival and bandstand for nightly entertainment. The Arts and Crafts show, Great Pumpkin contest, along with the Band Competition, Fun Run and Chili Cookoff provide activities for everyone. Great Bandstand Entertainment bring a conclusion to the diligent efforts of over 500 community volunteers.

While the Pageant & Medallion Hunt went on in 2020, other activities were canceled.

== Queen Neelah Pageant ==
Queen Neelah is a tradition of the Neewollah festival. Girls ages 17–18 from Independence and neighboring cities are allowed to compete in this pageant; usually there are around 25–30 contestants. There are two nights of the pageant, the talent portion and then the coronation. However, there are many activities the contestants must attend behind the scenes, such as the pop party, a tea party, a brunch, and they are also interviewed by the judges and have to create a bio. On the coronation night, the girls dress up in their dresses and walk the stage one at a time, at the end of the night the awards are handed out. The awards are Miss Talent, Miss Originality, Miss Beauty, Miss Interview, Miss Fashion, Miss Poise, Miss Personality, Miss Photogenic, 2nd Runner Up, 1st Runner Up, and Queen Neelah.

== The Grand Parade ==
The two-hour-long Grand Parade starts at the corner of Penn and Chestnut. It proceeds from Memorial Hall south on Main St. east to Sixth St., south one block to Maple, where it turns west to Ninth St. The final leg travels north on Ninth St., ending just short of Independence Middle School. The Grand Parade is exceedingly well attended. Parade goers set up chairs on the front row in the wee hours of the morning on parade day. As the "great fly over" occurs at 11 a.m. the crowd will be five deep in many places along the route. There are free street acts, the carnival, and food concessions along Penn Ave. both before and after the Neewollah Grand Parade.

=== Other Parades ===
The Kiddie Parade

One of the big attractions of the annual Neewollah Celebration is the Parade of the Children. The Children’s Parade was organized years ago for the enjoyment of the children of Independence and surrounding area. Down through the years, this event has grown to over 1,000 children participating. In recent years, as many as 15 Middle School bands from all over eastern Kansas have marched in the Kiddie Parade. Families and organizations have built over thirty floats in past parades.

Doo Dah Parade
The Doo Dah Parade is the adult only event of Neewollah. From year to year there may be an overall theme, while other years it's a free for all. The Mardi gras type parade extends from Memorial Hall to just south of Penn and Main. A King and Queen Doo Dah are selected each year to preside over the parade of rowdies that is liberally sprinkled with a variety of odd drill teams, bearded beauties, and unusual creatures.

== Marching Band Festival ==
The Neewollah Marching Festival held on the last Saturday of October, is one of the longest running festivals in the state or area. It takes place at the Independence Community College and high school football field. In accordance with regulations approved by KSHSAA, Neewollah is able to offer to any band that wishes to compete for top honors, the opportunity to compete in the Best of Class category. The Best of Class category will be grouped into four groups, based on your band size, not district size. In addition, Trophies are awarded, in each class, for the Outstanding Drum Major, Outstanding Color Guard, Outstanding Percussion Line. The grand champion of the festival also receives a trophy.

In order to compete in the Marching Band Festival, bands have to march in the Grand Parade.

== Musical ==
There is a musical each year in The Neewollah Festival. In past years, there have been such musicals as The Little Mermaid and The Addams Family. The 2024 Musical for Neewollah was Elf. Residents of Independence and nearby towns can audition for the musical. The musical is performed three times before Neewollah activities start.

== Other Neewollah Celebrations ==
University of St. Thomas (Texas)

Greensboro College

== In popular culture ==
Neewollah is mentioned in the play Picnic by William Inge, in which the character Madge is said to have been voted Queen of Neewollah.
