= Flatiron Building (Fort Worth, Texas) =

Building in Texas, United States

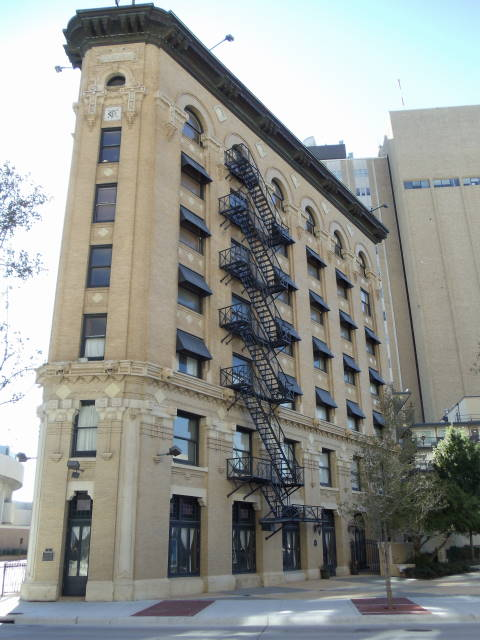
- Flatiron Building in 2011

- Location within Texas Location within the United States

General information
- Status: Completed
- Type: Office building
- Architectural style: Chicago
- Location: 1000 Houston St., Fort Worth, Texas, United States
- Coordinates: 32°45′1″N 97°19′46″W
- Completed: 1907

Technical details
- Floor count: 7
- Grounds: 0.2 acres (0.081 ha)

Design and construction
- Architects: Marshall R. Sanguinet; Carl G. Staats
- Architecture firm: Sanguinet & Staats

Renovating team
- Architect: Raymond O'Connor
- Main contractor: Scott Dennett Construction
- Flatiron Building
- U.S. National Register of Historic Places
- Recorded Texas Historic Landmark
- NRHP reference No.: 71000964
- RTHL No.: 1910

Significant dates
- Added to NRHP: March 31, 1971
- Designated RTHL: 1970

The Flatiron Building is located in downtown Fort Worth, Texas, at the corner of Houston and West 9th streets. At the time of its completion in 1907 it was one of the city's first steel frame buildings and the tallest building in north Texas.

== History ==
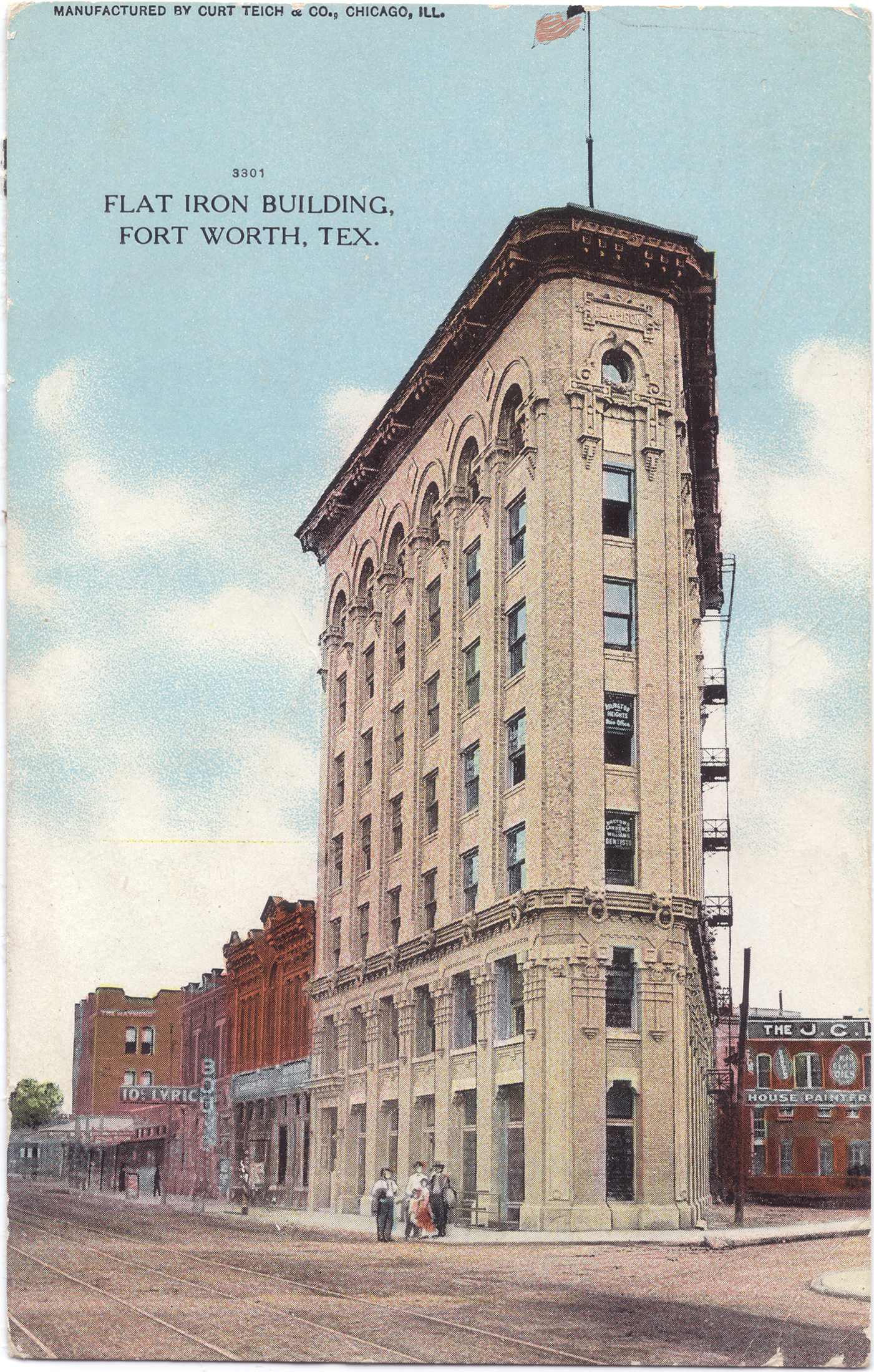
Postcard of the Flatiron Building, undated

Fort Worth's Flatiron Building was commissioned by local physician Dr. Bacon Saunders, who reserved the top floor for his offices, at a cost of $70,000. The building was to be located on a flatiron shaped corner and was originally known as Saunders' Triangle Building.

Early in the construction nearby merchants complained about the shadow that such a tall structure would cast over the downtown area, but their objections were eventually pacified by thoughts of the publicity the building would bring and Police Chief Maddox's promise to watch the construction site lest strong winds bring the girders down on them.

William Jenkins Worth, the man for whom the city of Fort Worth is named, is buried in Worth Square whose obelisk points to the base of Manhattan's Flatiron Building, which inspired the design of the Fort Worth building.

== Architecture ==
The building was designed by Fort Worth's top architectural firm Sanguinet & Staats in the renaissance revival style. It is constructed of reinforced concrete over a steel frame. The facade is divided into a two-story base supporting a five-story body capped by a heavily ornamented cast iron cornice. The east and west facades are further divided into bays by piers which rise to arches in the top level. The building carries further ornamentation in the form of carved panther heads above the second story and brick lozenges.

Interior design included open floor space to facilitate flexible division into offices. Additionally, "The elevator lobby of the Flatiron, with its handsome Classical details, ceramic tile floor, and marble wainscoting, as well as the ornate iron work of the elevator..." serves to illustrate the attention paid to the public areas of the building in order to entice clients.

The original design specified ten stories, but this had to be scaled back to seven due to budget concerns following the Panic of 1907.

The building is listed in the National Register of Historic Places.

In 1989, the building was purchased by George Cravens III, and renovated by the architectural firm O'Connor Architecture & Interior Design Management Co., L.L.C. As of 2021, the building has commercial rental space on the second, third, and fourth floors, and the first floor is used to host events.

== See also ==
- List of buildings named Flatiron Building
- National Register of Historic Places listings in Tarrant County, Texas
- Recorded Texas Historic Landmarks in Tarrant County
