= Chapel of St. Basil =

Church building in Texas, United States

Coordinates: 29.7384°N 95.3932°W

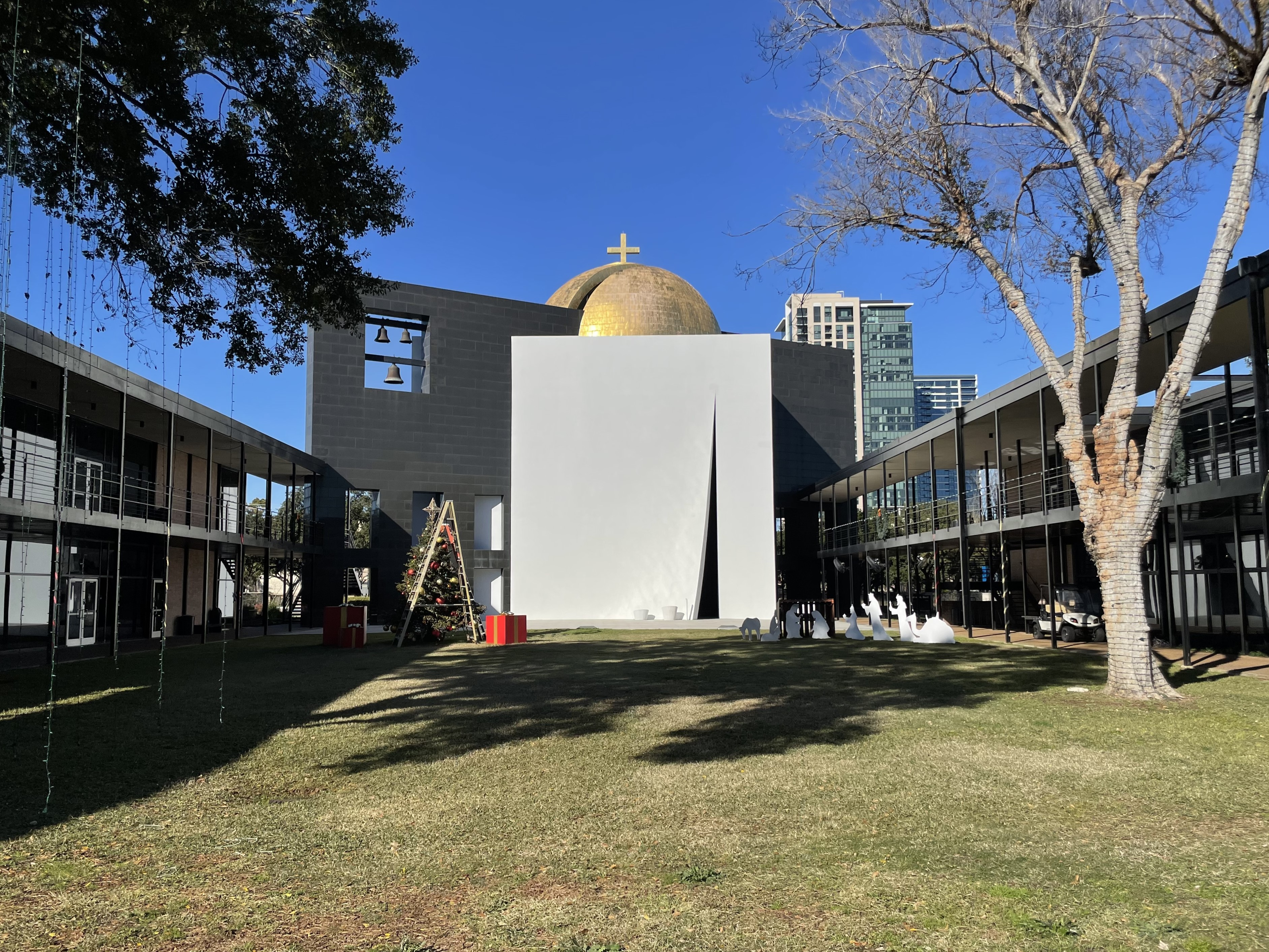
The Chapel of St. Basil on the Academic Mall

The Chapel of St. Basil is a chapel on the campus of the University of St. Thomas in Houston, Texas, designed by Philip Johnson in 1997.

== Location ==
The Chapel of St. Basil is located at the North end of the University's Academic Mall. The mall itself is a series of buildings representing various academic disciplines and various forms of scholarly activity. The buildings face one another and are open to each other, indicating the interdependence of all scholarly endeavor. No non-academic auxiliary operations are located on the mall.

The Chapel and Doherty Library are located at opposite ends of the Academic Mall to represent the dialogue between faith and reason, respectively. The Chapel, despite being adjacent to West Alabama street, faces inward towards the Academic Mall as an important part of this symbolism.

== Structure ==
The structure of the Chapel is composed of three basic geometric forms: the cube, the sphere, and the plane. The cube comprises the majority of the building, including the main seating area, while the dome (a semi-sphere) rises high above the cube. The granite plane bisects the cube and opens up the chapel to light. The cube and plane interplay with the dome, creating a sense of the dome not being a closing vault on top of the Chapel, but rather an opening to the heavens.

The Chapel itself contrasts with all of the other buildings on campus, as it is composed of white stucco and black granite as opposed to the rose-colored brick that comprises the exterior of the other campus buildings. Through its height, the Chapel dominates the whole campus. The gold dome at the top of the structure proclaims the university's Christian character, and can be seen from miles away from large buildings throughout downtown, uptown, and the medical center.

A setup of the architecture also shifts the focus of the building. The entry to the outdoor narthex of the Chapel is created with a tent-like flap extending over the entry, creating an enclosed space that is still outdoors. The entrances to the Chapel are faced away from the center of the building and towards the tabernacle as a reminder to all who enter that the central point of the Chapel is not the altar or the crucifix, but rather the location of the Eucharist.

The structural design was performed by CJG Engineers, based in Houston and Austin.

== Interior Design ==
The Chapel includes a fascinating play on light, as there is no artificial light inside the main section of building during the daytime. There is sufficient sunlight to fully light the worship space, as a combination of smooth textures and reflective surfaces maximize all light shone in the building. At night, the lights from outside combined with candles inside the Chapel are more than enough to illuminate the worship area.

The altar, located on the north side of the building, is made of granite, featuring ridges on either side with a ripple effect, designed to represent the "water of life" provided by Christ. Behind the altar are six candles, three on each side, each with the inscription "Sanctus" on them, such that each set of candles proclaims "Holy, Holy, Holy". The crucifix on the north wall consists of a centuries-old corpus donated by the Menil family, connected to a cross engraved into the wall of the chapel.

Just to the east of the altar is the pipe organ. To the west is the tabernacle, inscribed with a design of two angels praising towards heaven. When the doors of the tabernacle are shut, the angels wings' form a shape analogous to a flame. Above the tabernacle is an icon of St. Basil.

On the west wall of the chapel is a slanted glass cross (visible in the picture below). Below the cross are the Stations of the Cross, etched into the wall so as to give a 3-dimensional feel. On the east wall of the chapel is the statue of "Our Lady, Seat of Wisdom", a statue of Mary with the child Christ on her lap. In the statue, the child is holding a book in one hand while instructing with the other.

The interior of the chapel is designed to create a series of shifts during the mass. The entrances are not pointed towards the altar, but rather towards the tabernacle, focusing on the importance of the Eucharist. Likewise, the altar and crucifix are not located in the geometric center of the chapel, but rather are located slightly (but noticeably) to the left of the center. When seated, the pews are directed towards the altar, drawing a focus on the altar as the location of the Eucharist during the mass.

== Prayer Garden ==
During the 2005-2006 school year, a prayer garden was built on the west side of the chapel. The centerpiece of the garden is a labyrinth, surrounded by plants and bushes. Surrounding the plants and bushes is a gravel walkway rimmed by crepe myrtles. The North end of the prayer garden features three fountains, representative of the Trinity, and four benches mark the corners of the prayer garden.

During the subsequent school year, Aramark Dining Services renamed the university's student lounge "The Labyrinth" during a redecoration period in an attempt to emulate the popularity of the new garden.

Views of the Chapel of St. Basil
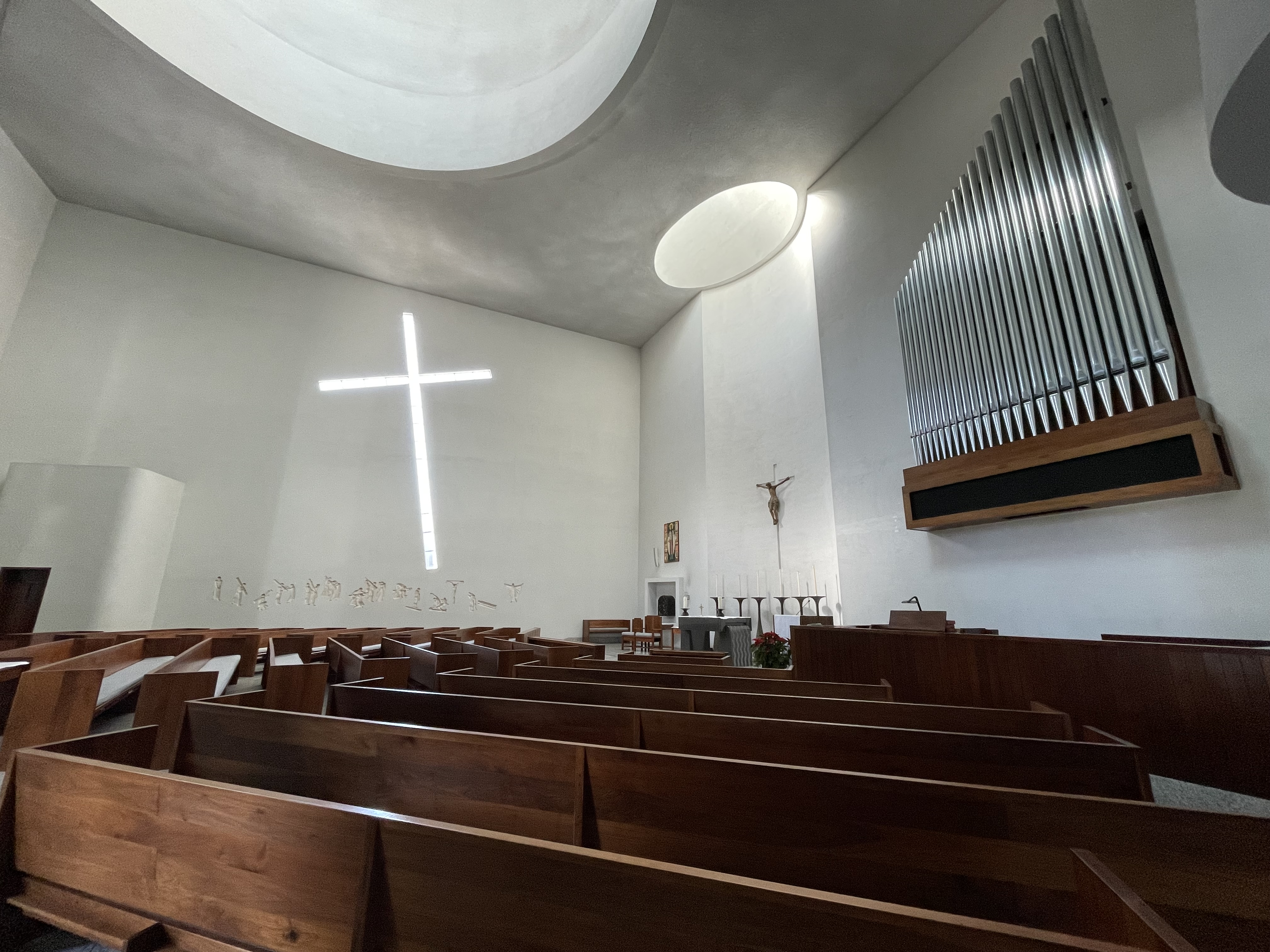
Interior view.

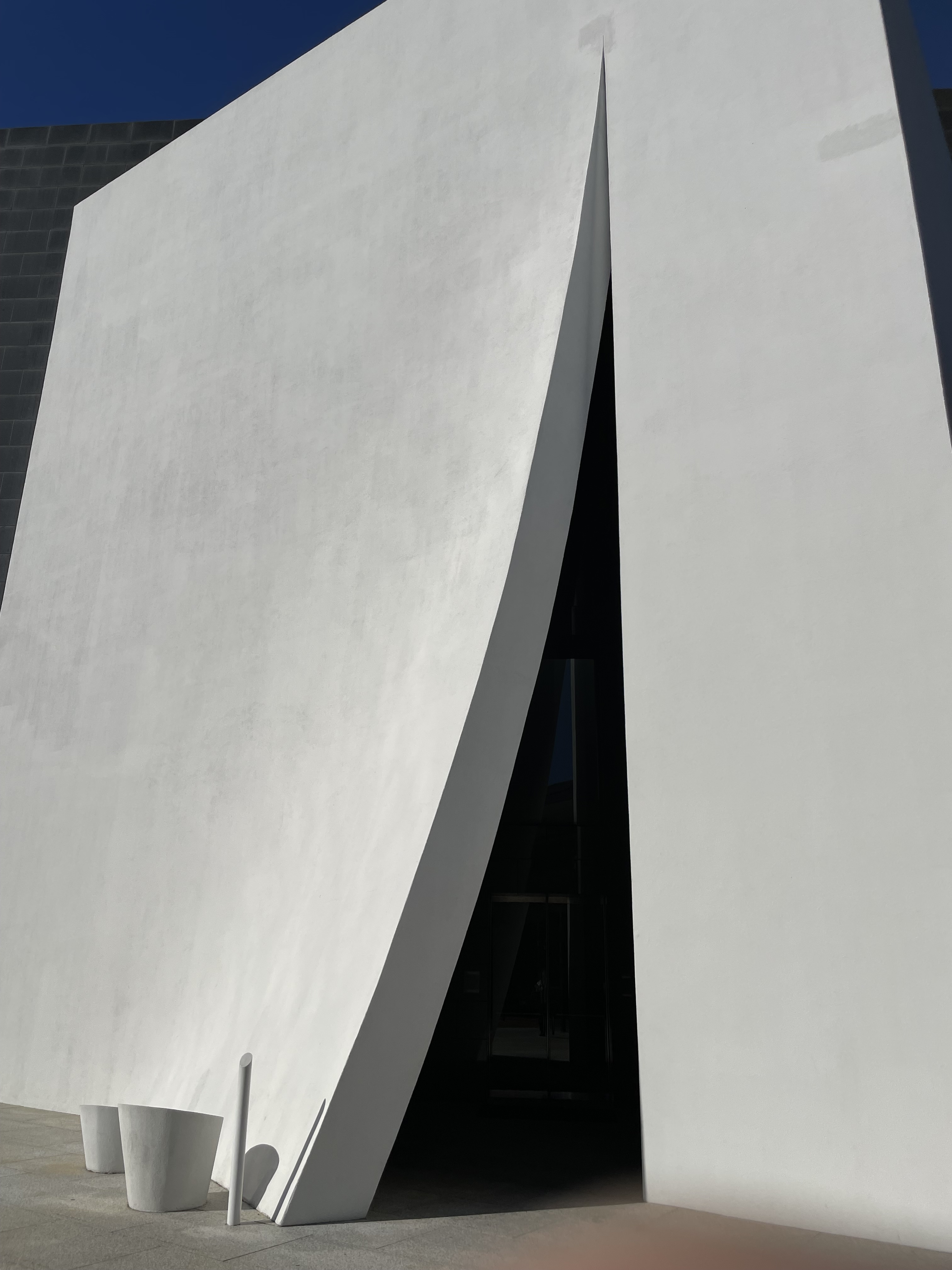
Main entrance

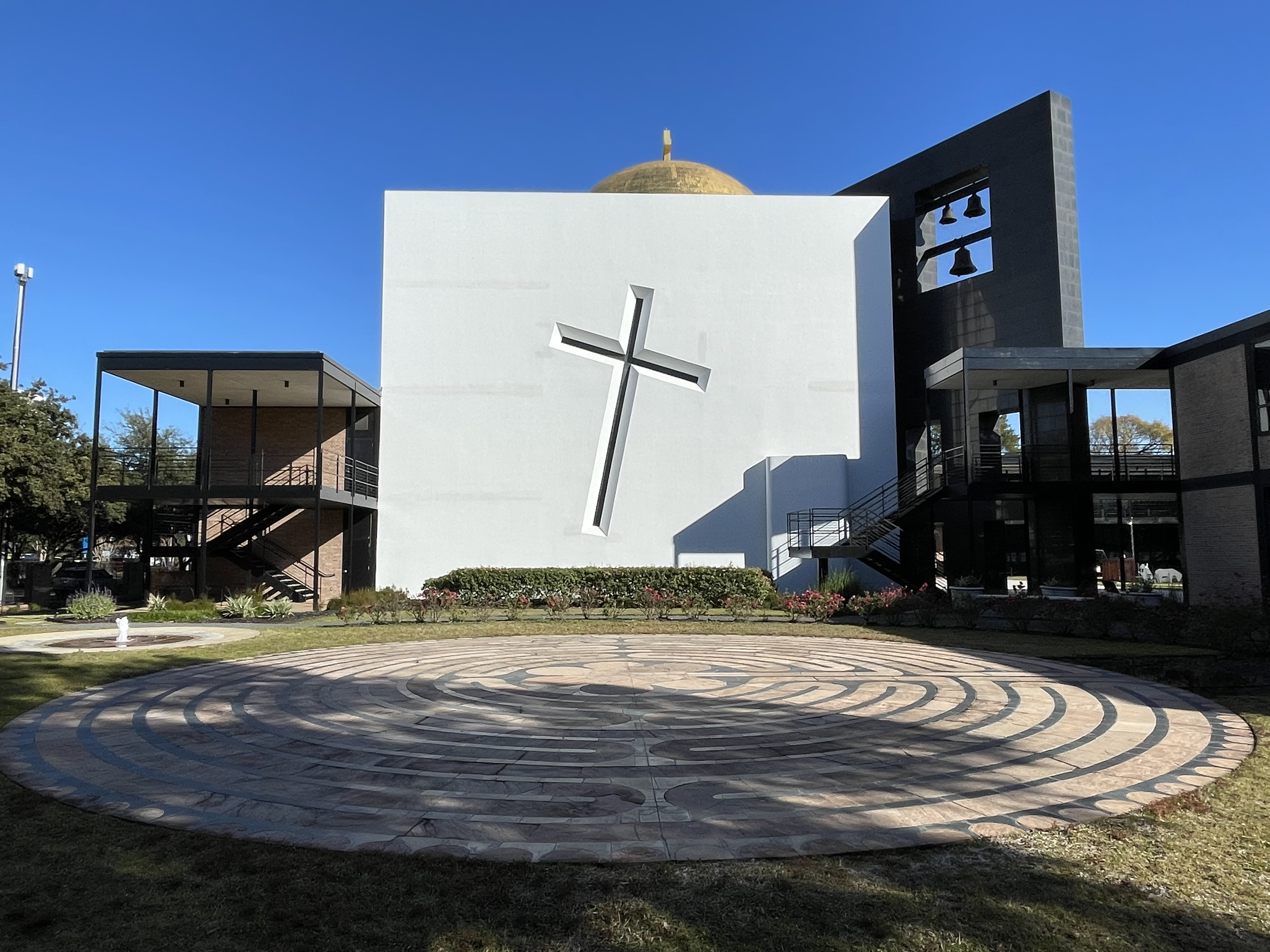
Western façade

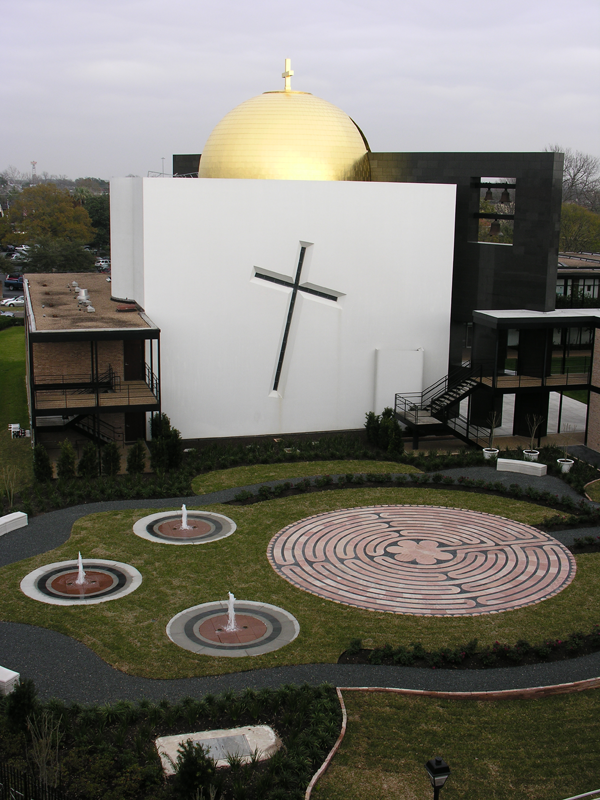
Elevated view of Prayer Garden adjacent to the Chapel of St. Basil

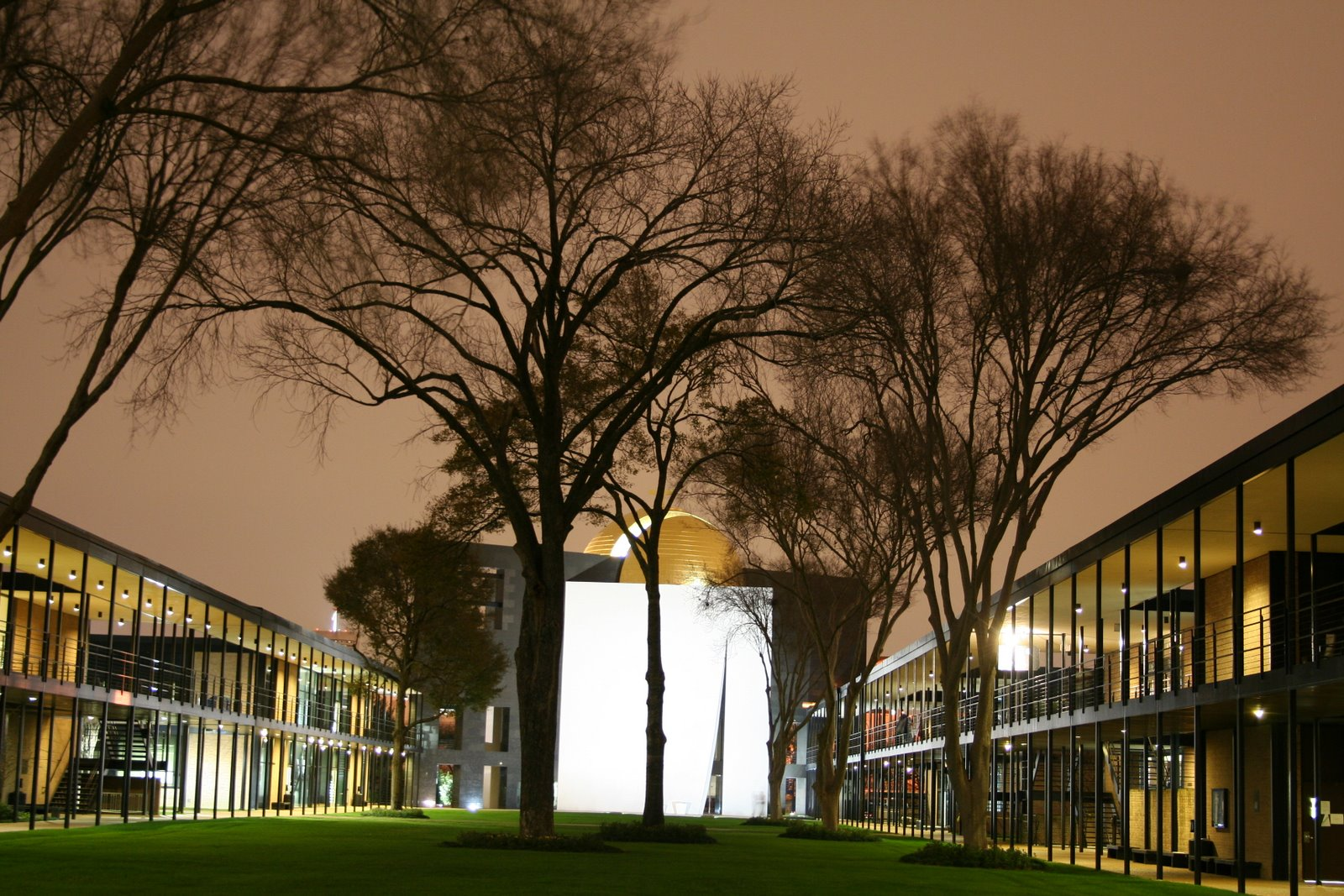
At night from the Academic Mall
