= Stephen F. Austin Elementary School =

- U.S. National Register of Historic Places
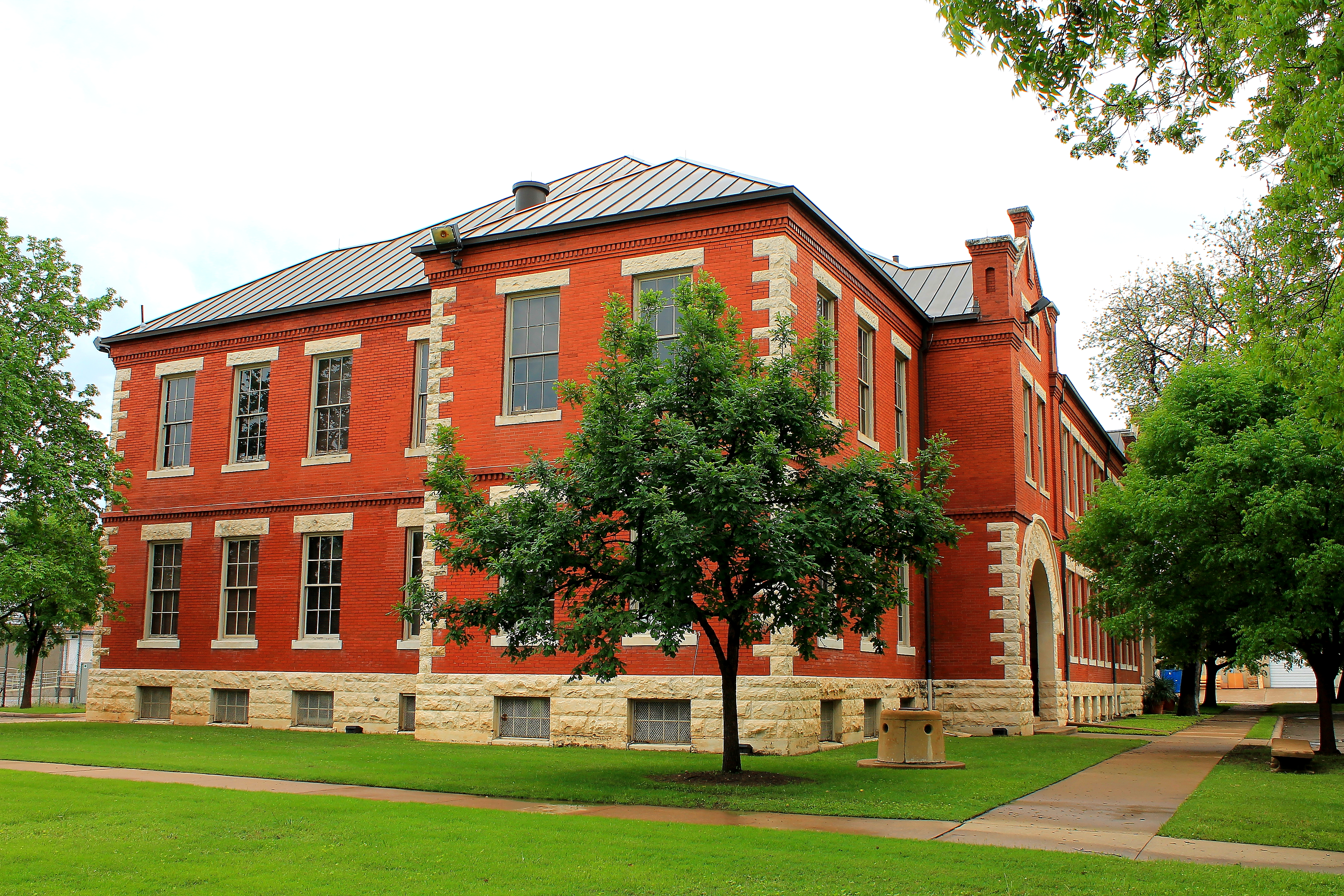
- Stephen F. Austin School in 2012

- Location within Texas Location within the United States
- Location: 319 Lipscomb St., Fort Worth, Texas
- Coordinates: 32°44′28″N 97°19′57″W
- Area: 1.8 acres (0.73 ha)
- Built: 1892
- Architect: Messer, Sanguinet & Messer; Sanguinet & Staats
- Architectural style: Romanesque
- NRHP reference No.: 83003160
- Added to NRHP: March 10, 1983

Stephen F. Austin School is located on 319 Lipscomb Street in Fort Worth, Texas. Designed by the firm Messer, Sanguinet and Messer, the school opened in 1892 as the Sixth Ward School or the Broadway School. The two-story structure was built utilizing the Richardsonian Romanesque style popularized by the architect Henry Hobson Richardson. It was renamed The Stephen F. Austin Elementary School in 1904. In 1909, an addition was constructed on the north part of the building. The school closed in 1977. Williamson-Dickie Manufacturing Company purchased the building in 1980 for $215,000 and used it as its corporate headquarters.

It was added to the National Register of Historic Places on March 10, 1983.

== Photo gallery ==
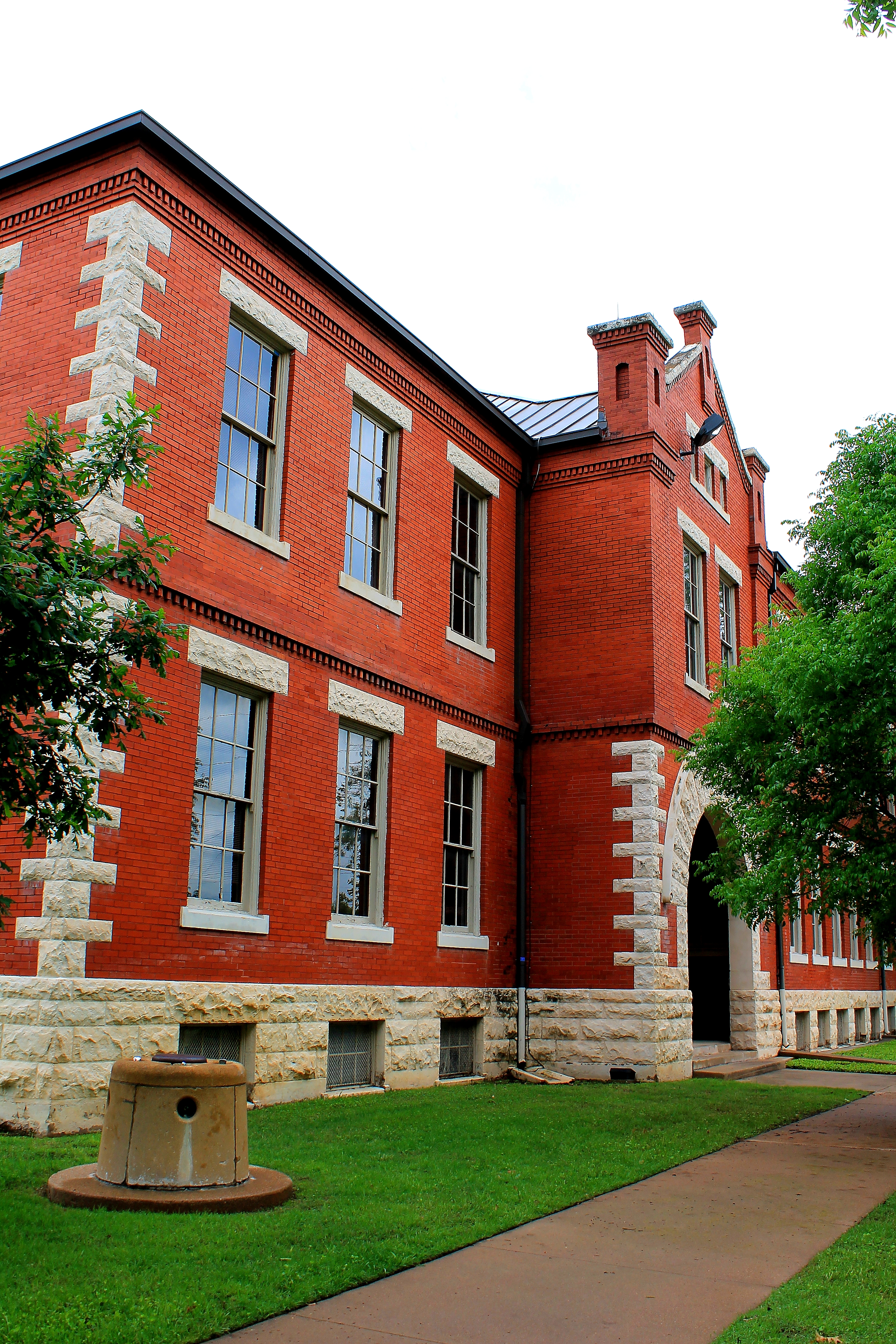

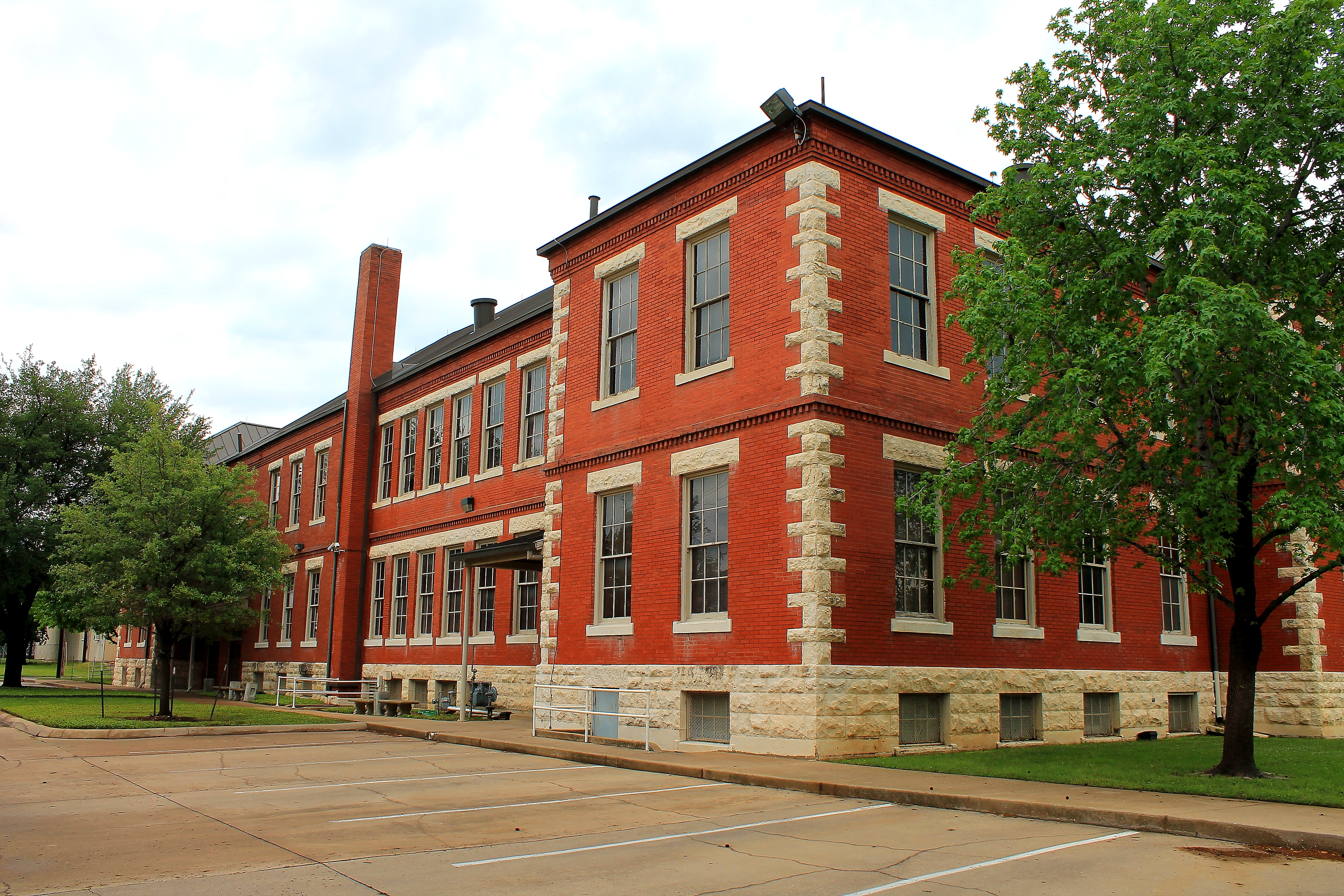

== See also ==
- National Register of Historic Places listings in Tarrant County, Texas
