= Sundance Square =

Central entertainment district in downtown Fort Worth, Texas

Coordinates: 32°45′32″N 97°19′38″W

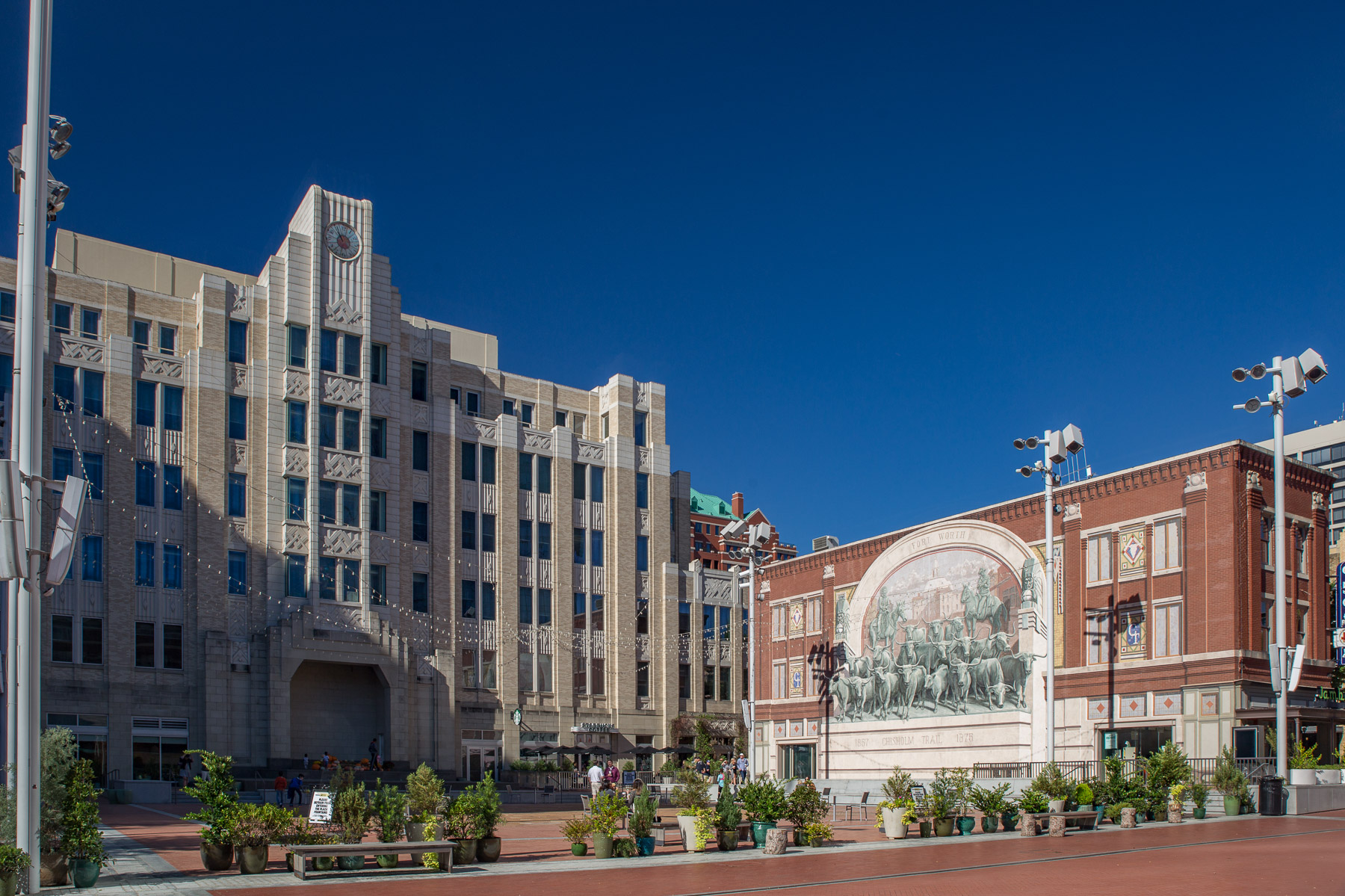
Sundance Square

Sundance Square is the name of a 35-block commercial, residential, entertainment and retail district in downtown Fort Worth, Texas. Named after the Sundance Kid in western folklore, it is a popular place for nightlife and entertainment in Fort Worth and for tourists visiting the Dallas/Fort Worth Metroplex. It is owned by Fine Line investments, a division of billionaire Ed Bass's investment funds.

The area includes numerous hotels, restaurants, condos, lofts, shops, museums, bars, clubs, a movie theatre, performing arts, concerts and festivals throughout the year. The former downtown Woolworth's Building, as well as Burk Burnett Building, are listed on the National Register of Historic Places. A mural on one building commemorates the Fort Worth segment of the Chisholm Trail cattle drives of 1867-1875. The district is also the location of the Bass Performance Hall.

== See also ==
- List of Neighborhoods in Fort Worth, Texas
- Caravan of Dreams
- Reata Restaurant
