= Marshall R. Sanguinet House =

Historic house in Texas, United States

- U.S. National Register of Historic Places
- Recorded Texas Historic Landmark
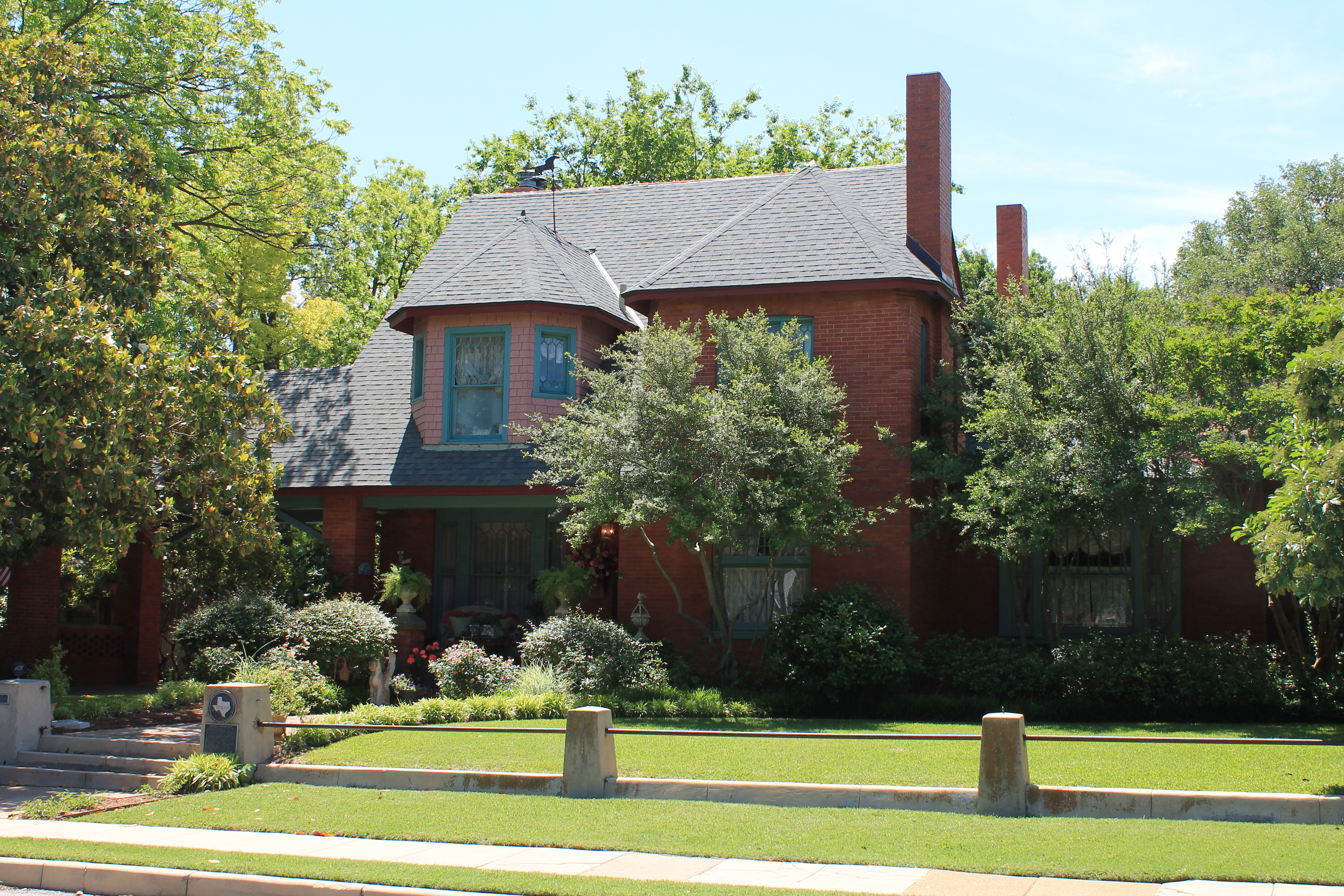
- Sanguinet House in 2012

- Location within Texas Location within the United States
- Location: 4729 Collinwood Ave., Fort Worth, Texas
- Coordinates: 32°44′14″N 97°23′26″W
- Area: less than one acre
- Built: 1894
- Architect: Marshall R. Sanguinet
- Architectural style: Bungalow/Craftsman
- NRHP reference No.: 83003162
- RTHL No.: 3224

Significant dates
- Added to NRHP: June 7, 1983
- Designated RTHL: 1981

Marshall R. Sanguinet House is located on 4729 Collinwood Avenue in Fort Worth, Texas, United States. It was added to the National Register of Historic Places on June 7, 1983. Marshall R. Sanguinet helped design over 20 houses in the Arlington Heights area. The house on Collinwood was built in 1894. A dining room was added in 1906. He lived in the house until his death in 1936. The Sanguinet family sold the house in 1952.

== See also ==
- National Register of Historic Places listings in Tarrant County, Texas
- Recorded Texas Historic Landmarks in Tarrant County
