= Sanguinet & Staats =

American architectural firm

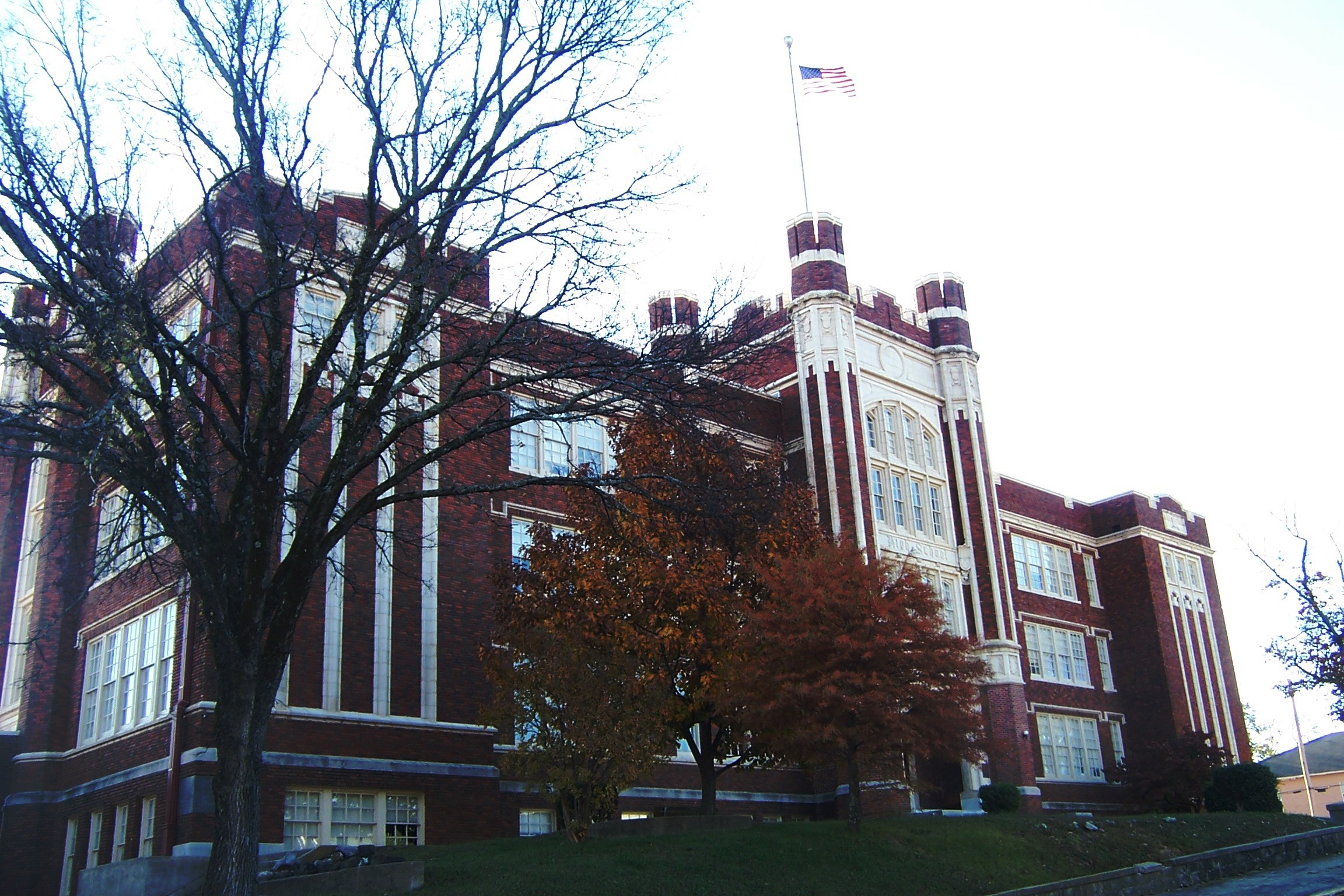
Hot Springs High School (Arkansas), 1914

Sanguinet & Staats was an architectural firm based in Fort Worth, Texas, with as many as five branch offices in Texas. The firm specialized in steel-frame construction and built many skyscrapers in Texas. The firm also accepted commissions for residential buildings, and designed many buildings listed on the National Register of Historic Places.

== History of the Partnerships ==
Sanguinet & Staats was an architecture firm formed in 1903 by Marshall R. Sanguinet, who had practiced in Fort Worth since 1883, and Carl G. Staats, a draftsman who had worked for James Riely Gordon. The firm established its original office in Fort Worth and later expanded with offices in five Texas cities: Dallas, Houston, San Antonio, Waco, and Wichita Falls. Sanguinet & Staats also took on various partners over time. In 1903, the Dallas office sprung from a new partnership called Sanguinet, Staats and Hill, which operated for two years under that name until Charles D. Hill left the firm. In 1922, architect Wyatt C. Hedrick joined and it became Sanguinet, Staats, and Hedrick. In turn, this firm added R.D. Gottlieb as a limited partner for just the Houston office, forming Sanguinet, Staats, Hedrick, and Gottlieb. Sanguinet and Staats retired in 1926 after selling their shares to Hedrick. From 1923 to 1934, Preston M. Geren Sr. worked for the firm as chief engineer before starting his own Fort Worth firm.

== Works ==
Although Sanguinet and Staats designed various kinds of buildings, the firm's main business was the design and construction of tall, street-framed office buildings.

Works (and credits) include:

- Agricultural Pavilion, 1925, with architects Wyatt C. Hedrick; Sanguinet, Staats, and Hedrick; William Ward Watkin.
- ALICO Building, built in 1910 by the architectural firm Sanguinet & Staats with associate architect Roy Lane, for the Amicable Life Insurance
- Neil P. Anderson Building, 411 W. 7th St. Fort Worth, Texas (Sanguinett & Staats) NRHP-listed
- Stephen F. Austin Elementary School, 319 Lipscomb St., Fort Worth, Texas (Messer, Sanguinet & Messer) NRHP-listed
- James L. Autry House, 5 Courtlandt Pl., Houston, Texas (Sanguinet & Staats) NRHP-listed
- William J. Bryce House, 4900 Bryce Ave., Fort Worth, Texas (Sanguinet, Marshall) NRHP-listed
- Burk Burnett Building, 500—502 Main St., Fort Worth, Texas (Sanguinet & Staats) NRHP-listed
- Carter Building, 806 Main St., Houston, Texas (Sanguinet & Staats)
- A. S. Cleveland House, 8 Courtlandt Pl., Houston, Texas (Sanguinet & Staats) NRHP-listed
- John M. Dorrance House, 9 Courtlandt Pl., Houston, Texas (Sanguinet, Staats & Barnes) NRHP-listed
- Eighth Avenue Historic District, Bounded by 8th Ave., Pennsylvania Ave., 9th Ave., and Pruitt St., Fort Worth, Texas (Sanguinet & Staats) NRHP-listed
- Flatiron Building, 1000 Houston St., Fort Worth, Texas (Sanguinet & Staats) NRHP-listed
- Franklin Lofts, designed by architect Sanguinet and Staats
- Great Jones Building, with which Sanguinet & Staats is believed to be associated
- Hot Springs High School (Arkansas), Oak St. between Orange and Olive Sts., Hot Springs, AR Late Gothic Revival architecture (Sanguinet & Staats) NRHP-listed
- Hotel Texas, 815 Main St., Fort Worth, Texas (Sanguinet & Staats) NRHP-listed
- Knights of Pythias Building (Fort Worth, Texas), 315 Main St., Fort Worth, Texas restored 1981, designed by architect Sanguinet & Staats, 1901; renovated Thomas E. Woodward & Associates, 1988 NRHP-listed
- Link-Lee House, 3800 Montrose, Houston, Texas (Sanguinet & Staats) NRHP-listed
- C. L. Neuhaus House, 6 Courtlandt Pl., Houston, Texas (Sanguinet, Staats & Barnes) NRHP-listed
- North Fort Worth High School (now J.P. Elder Annex), 600 Park St., Fort Worth, Texas (Sanguinet and Staats) NRHP-listed
- Our Lady of Victory Academy, 801 W. Shaw St., Fort Worth, Texas (Sanguinet and Staats) NRHP-listed
- Palestine High School (now the Museum for East Texas Culture), 400 Micheaux Ave., Palestine, Texas (Sanguinet & Staats) NRHP-listed
- Paul Building, 1018 Preston Ave., Houston, Texas (Sanguinet & Staats) NRHP-listed
- Sam Houston Hotel, 1117 Prairie St., Houston, Texas (Sanguinet, Staats, Hedrick & Gottlie) NRHP-listed
- San Jacinto Building, designed by the firm Sanguinet, Staats, and Gottlieb.
- Marshall R. Sanguinet House, 4729 Collinwood Ave., Fort Worth, Texas (Sanguinet, Marshall R.) NRHP-listed
- Scarbrough Building, 500 block, Congress Ave., Austin, Texas (Sanguinet & Staats)
- South Main Baptist Church, designed in 1924 by Sanguinet, Staats, Hedrick and Gottlieb
- St. Andrew's Episcopal Church, Texas, build 1909–1912, designed by Sanguinet & Staats
- St. Mary of the Assumption Church, Texas, built 1923, designed by architect Sanguinet, Staats & Hedrick, architecture Romanesque, Romanesque Revival. NRHP-listed
- Sterling Myer House, 4 Courtlandt Pl., Houston, Texas (Sanguinet & Staats) NRHP-listed
- Texas Technological College Dairy Barn, Texas Tech University campus, Lubbock, Texas (Sanguinet, Staats & Hedrick) NRHP-listed
- W. T. Waggoner Building, 810 Houston St., Fort Worth, TX (Sanguinet & Staats) NRHP-listed
- Wharton-Scott House, 1509 Pennsylvania Ave., Fort Worth, TX (Sanguinet & Staats) NRHP-listed
- Wilson Building, 1621-1623 Main St., Dallas, TX (Sanguinet & Staats) NRHP-listed
