= ALICO Building =

Building in Waco, Texas

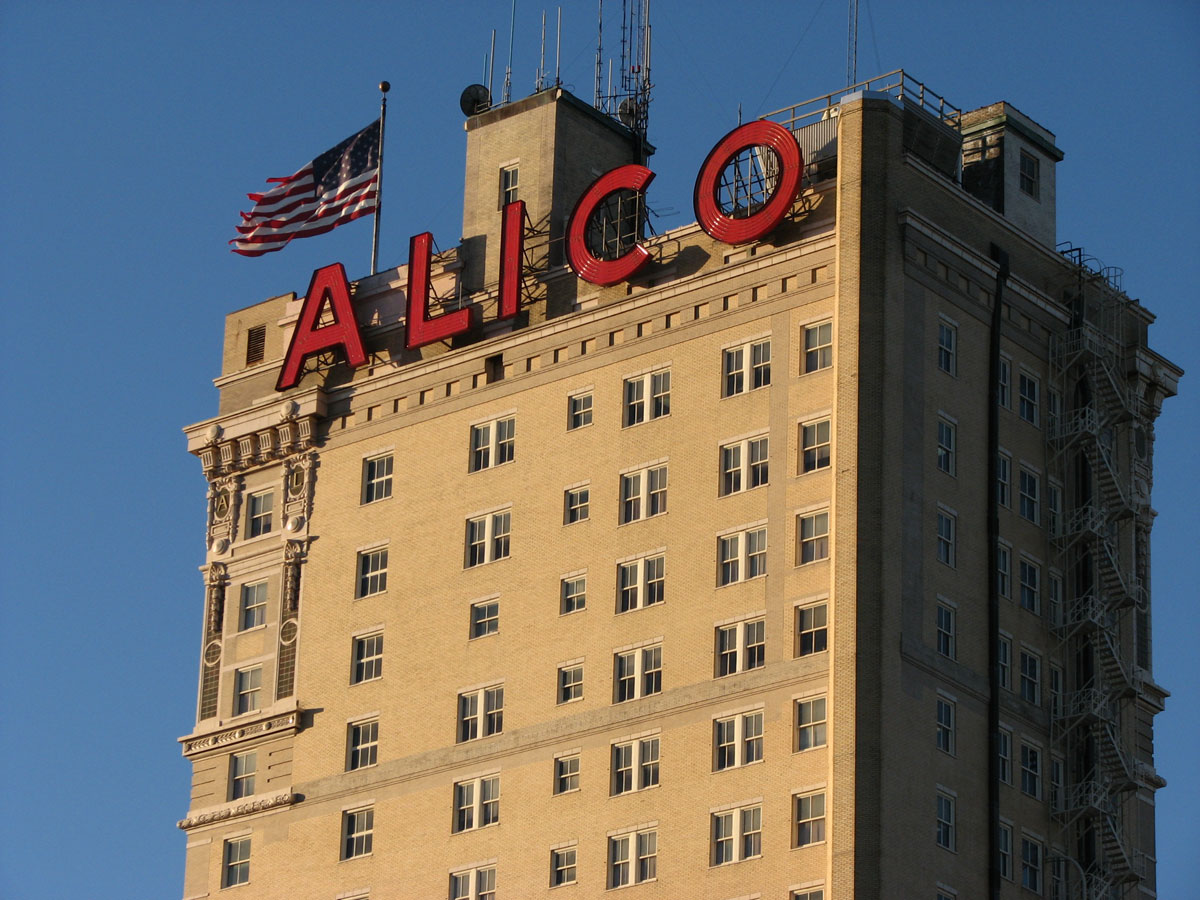
- Upper floors of ALICO building

- Location within Texas Location within the United States

General information
- Status: Completed
- Type: Office
- Architectural style: Beaux-Arts
- Location: 425 Austin Avenue, Waco, Texas, United States of America
- Coordinates: 31°33′25.2″N 97°7′55.2″W
- Current tenants: American-Amicable Life Insurance Company of Texas
- Construction started: August 1910
- Opened: August 1911
- Renovated: 1966
- Cost: US$755,000 (equivalent to US$26,087,946 in 2025)

Height
- Height: 282 feet (86 m)

Technical details
- Structural system: Steel
- Material: Brick, Terra Cotta
- Floor count: 22
- Lifts/elevators: 3

Design and construction
- Architecture firm: Sanguinet & Staats

Website
- Official website
- ALICO Building
- U.S. Historic district – Contributing property
- Recorded Texas Historic Landmark
- Part of: Waco Downtown Historic District (ID11001094)
- RTHL No.: 118

Significant dates
- Designated CP: February 3, 2012
- Designated RTHL: 1982

The ALICO Building is a 22-story office building in downtown Waco, Texas, United States, located at the intersection of Austin and 5th Street. The building is currently owned and operated by the American-Amicable Life Insurance Company of Texas (a subsidiary of Industrial Alliance). At 282 feet (86 m) tall, it is currently the tallest building in Waco.

== History ==
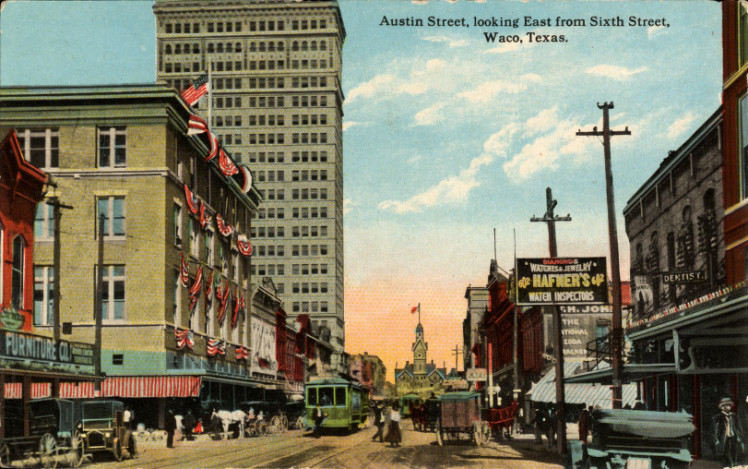
Postcard displaying downtown Waco, including the ALICO building (circa 1913)

The ALICO building was built in 1910 by the architectural firm Sanguinet & Staats for the Amicable Life Insurance Company at a cost of US$755,000 (equivalent to US$26,087,946 in 2025), and was completed in one year. (Note: Baughman, Kyle; Sawyer, Amanda. "Amicable (ALICO) Building". Waco History. Archived from the original on 2022-06-08. Alt URL) It was the tallest building West of the Mississippi River until the Adolphus Hotel was completed in 1912. It is the second oldest skyscraper built in Texas as well as the oldest skyscraper in Texas still standing, after the Praetorian Building in Dallas, built in the year prior to ALICO, (Note: "Praetorian Building". Archived from the original on 2022-06-08. Alt URL) was demolished in 2013.

The ALICO Building was not heavily damaged by the 1953 Waco tornado outbreak, unlike many buildings in downtown Waco. It swayed several feet when directly hit by the F5 tornado, although the building escaped severe damage or collapse. (Note: Troessner, John. "Ten Things You Should Know About the ALICO Building of Waco". Texas Escapes.)

In 1958, 15-foot tall red neon letters with the name ALICO were added to the top of the building, with the installation of the final "O" completed on November 12, 1958. In 1965, Amicable Life Insurance Company and American Life Insurance Company merged to become the American-Amicable Life Insurance Company, the current tenant of the building. In 1966, the building underwent renovations, including the addition of a modern façade on the lower floors.

In 1982, the ALICO building was designated a historical landmark by the Texas Historical Commission. In 2012, it was added to the National Register of Historic Places as part of the Waco Downtown Historic District. (Note: "Waco considers making ALICO building a local historic landmark". KXXV. 2018-06-23. Archived from the original on 2022-06-08. Alt URL)
