= IA Financial Group =

Canadian insurance and wealth management company

iA Financial Group

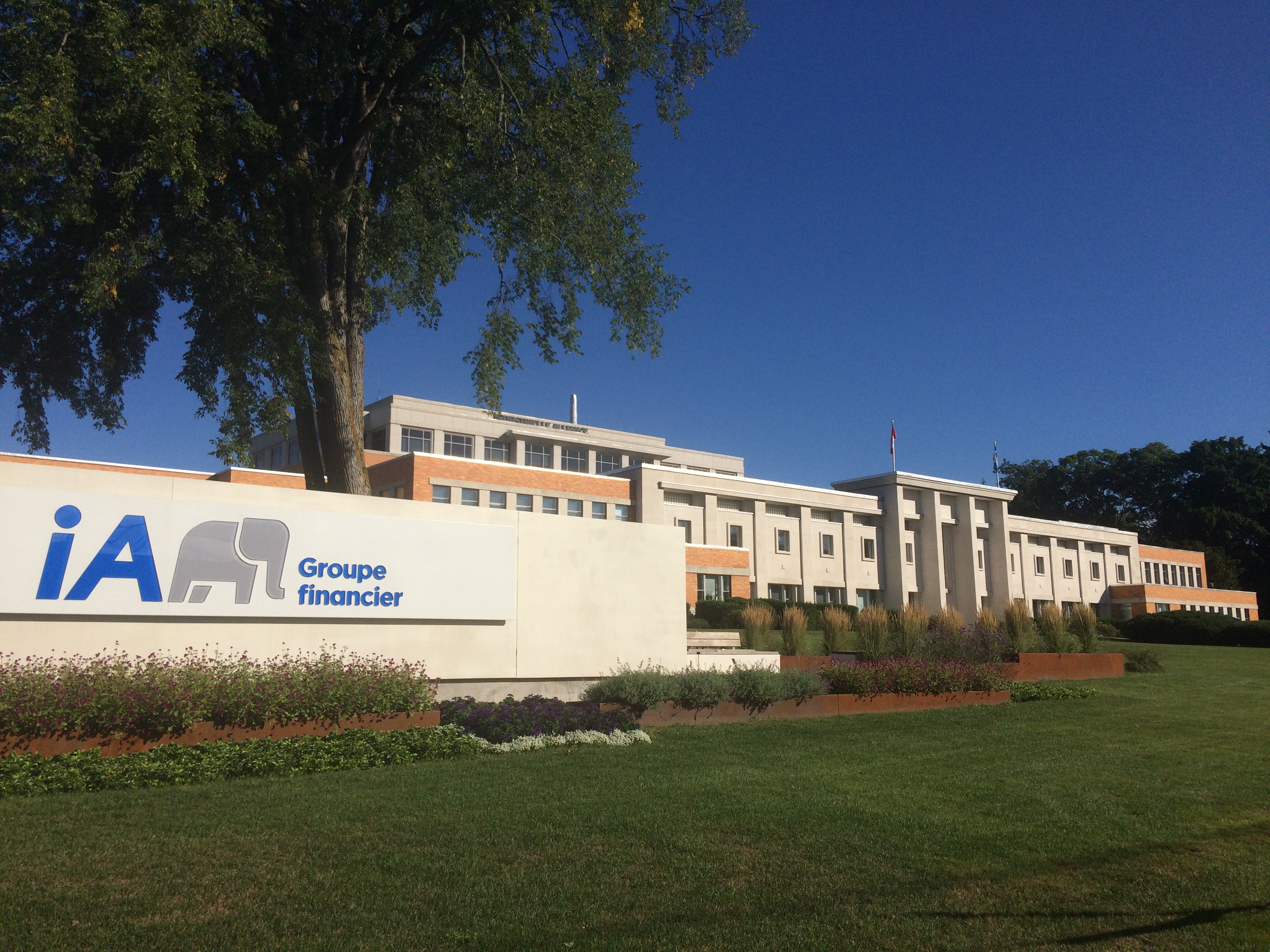
- Headquarters, Quebec City
- Type: Business Corporation (Quebec)
- Traded as: TSX: IAG (Common); TSX: IAF (Preferred)
- Industry: Financial services, Insurance
- Founded: 1892; 134 years ago
- Founder: Hormidas Laporte and Bernard Leonard
- Headquarters: Quebec, Canada
- Key people: Denis Ricard (President and CEO)
- Products: Individual insurance, individual wealth management, group insurance, group savings and retirement, dealer services, general insurance (auto and home)
- Number of employees: 9,200 (June 2023)
- Website: ia.ca

iA Financial Group (a.k.a. Industrial Alliance) is a Canadian insurance and wealth management group that operates in Canada and the United States. It is one of the largest public companies in Canada.

The parent company, iA Financial Corporation Inc., is a portfolio management company which is listed on the Toronto Stock Exchange under the ticker symbols IAG (common shares). The preferred shares of its subsidiary, Industrial Alliance Insurance and Financial Services Inc. are listed on the Toronto Stock Exchange under the ticker symbol IAF.

In October 2023, iA Financial Group acquired Vericity, a U.S.-based insurance company, for $170 million.

== See also ==
- ALICO Building
