= University of St. Thomas (Texas) =

Catholic university in Houston, Texas

- Motto: Crescamus in Christo (Latin)
- Motto in English: Let us grow in Christ
- Type: Private university
- Established: 1947; 79 years ago
- Founder: Congregation of St. Basil
- Accreditation: SACS
- Religious affiliation: Catholic
Academic affiliations
ACCU; CIC; ICUSTA	NAICU
- Chairman: Robert F. Corrigan, Jr.
- President: Sinda Vanderpool
- Students: 4,353 (fall 2024)
- Undergraduates: 3,395 (fall 2024)
- Postgraduates: 958 (fall 2024)
- Location: Houston, Texas, United States; 29.7367°N 95.3932°W
- Campus: Urban Main Montrose, Houston Satellite Conroe, Texas 50 acres (20 ha)
- Colors: (Crimson and gold)
- Nickname: Celts
- Sporting affiliations: NCAA Division III – SCAC
- Website: stthom.edu

The University of St. Thomas (UST or St. Thomas) is a private Catholic university in Houston, Texas, United States. It was founded by the Basilian Fathers in 1947 and is the only Catholic university in the Archdiocese of Galveston-Houston.

== History ==
On June 24, 1944, the bishop of the Diocese of Galveston, Christopher E. Byrne, entered into an agreement with the Houston-based members of the Congregation of St. Basil to found a co-educational Roman Catholic university in Houston "as soon as practicable after World War II, if possible by 1947." The Basilian Fathers had previously started several other secondary schools, as well as institutions of higher learning, throughout Texas in the early 20th century, including St. Thomas High School, also located in Houston. The first classes at UST began on September 22, 1947, with 57 freshmen and 8 faculty members. UST graduated its first class on May 31, 1951. In addition to the Basilian Fathers on staff, there were for some time also several Franciscan Sisters of the Eucharist who resided in the convent on campus. The order no longer has a presence there, but the Houston Vietnamese Dominican Sisters and the Sisters of Mary Mother of the Eucharist serve in some teaching capacities.

The university is named after St. Thomas Aquinas. Originally consisting solely of the Link–Lee House on the corner of Montrose and West Alabama, the university has expanded towards the South and West over the last 60 years. The current expansion plan includes the acquisition and development of the majority of the land comprising 25 city blocks.

Former university president J. Michael Miller, C.S.B. was appointed on November 25, 2003, by the pope to preside as Secretary of the Congregation for Catholic Education. By virtue of this office, Miller was elevated to archbishop by Pope John Paul II on January 12, 2004.

== Campuses ==
=== Main ===
The University of St. Thomas's main campus is located in the Montrose neighborhood of Neartown. The campus borders Houston's Museum District and is adjacent to the Menil Collection and the Rothko Chapel.

Many of the university's offices are in houses built in the 1930s, scattered throughout campus. Some are historic, one being the Link–Lee House

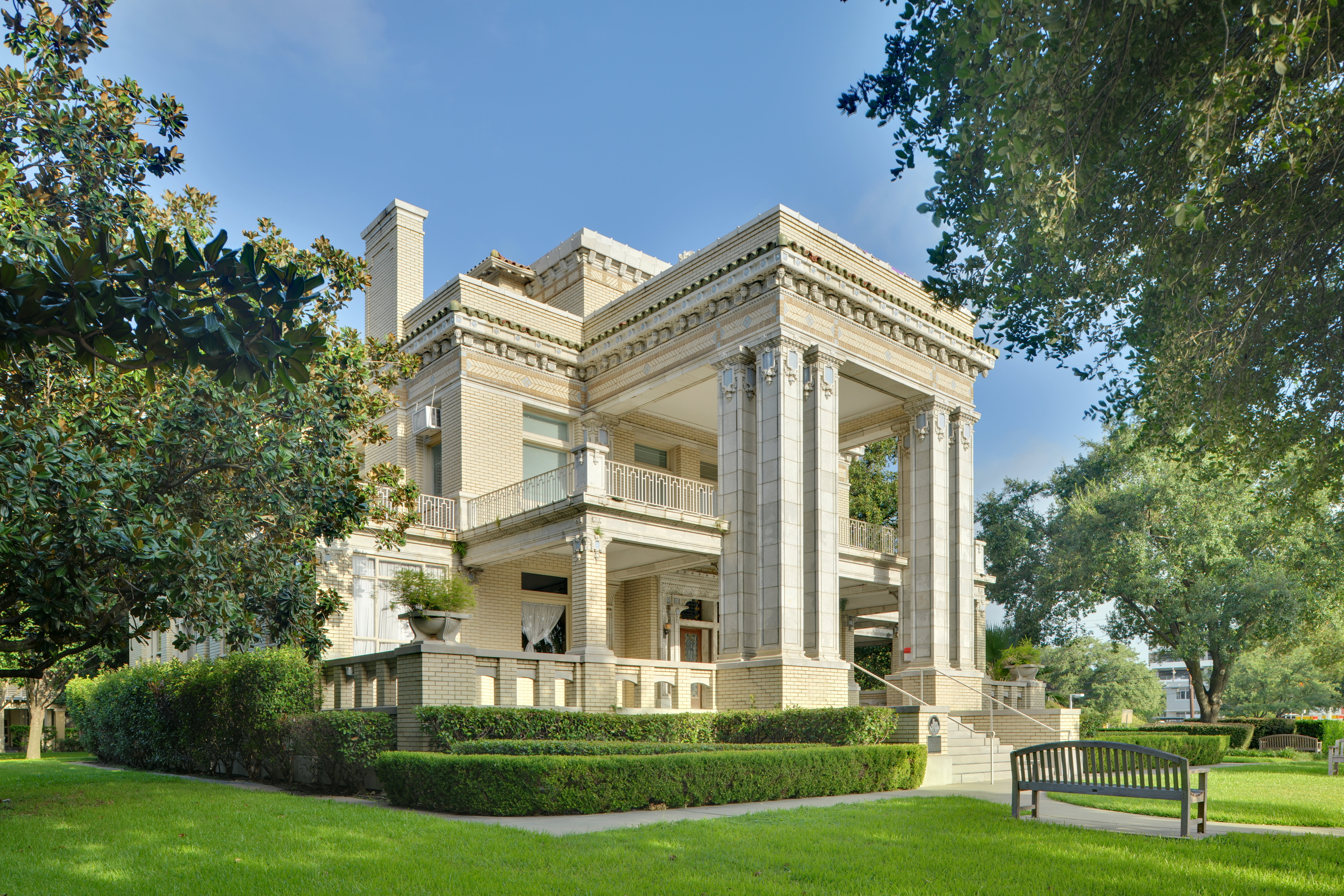
The Link-Lee House at UST is a Recorded Texas Historic Landmark and part of the National Register of Historic Places

which contains the university's executive office. Another historic building houses the Theology department (and formerly housed the Modern Languages Department), located in the childhood home of Howard Hughes. The campus is arranged in a square format, with the main focus of buildings on the north side of the campus which is called the Academic Mall. Composed of rectangular buildings, the Academic Mall is the symbolic architecture of Philip Johnson. On the south end of the Academic Mall is the Doherty Library. The Chapel of St. Basil is located at the opposite end. Four structures flank these two buildings on each side in a rectangular formation surrounding a courtyard. The setup is designed to display the methods of human knowledge (faith, represented by the chapel, and reason, represented by the library) in dialogue regarding the various subject matters.

The Chapel of St. Basil is the main location of Catholic worship on campus. The Chapel of St. Basil is a unique work of art that has won many awards for its architecture. Basil was a fourth-century bishop who was a proponent of both education and the monastic life. The Chapel sits at the north end of the Academic Mall, representing faith in the Academic Mall's artistic depiction of faith and reason balanced in dialogue.

There is no artificial light inside the main section of the building during the daytime. There is sufficient sunlight to fully light the worship space, as a combination of smooth textures and reflective surfaces maximize all light shone in the building. At night, the lights from outside combined with candles inside the chapel are more than enough to illuminate the worship area.

The entry to the outdoor narthex of the chapel is created with a tent-like flap extending over the entry, creating an enclosed space that is still outdoors. The architecture also shifts the focus the building: the entrances to the Chapel face away from the center of the building and towards the tabernacle to remind all who enter that the central point of the chapel is not the altar or the crucifix, but the location of the Eucharist.

During the 2005–2006 school year, the Gueymard Meditation Garden was built on the west side of the chapel. The garden features three fountains, representing the persons of the Trinity, and benches for reflection. It also includes a replica of the labyrinth in the Cathedral of Chartres in France. Seen from above, the four arms of the pattern stand out as a clear image of the cross of Jesus Christ.

Completed in September 1972, The Robert Pace and Ada Mary Doherty Library (located at the southern end of the Academic Mall) is one of the premier research libraries in Houston. It houses over 250,000 books, 80,000 periodicals, and 150 databases.

In 2019 the university unveiled a mural created by Mario Figueroa Jr. (Gonzo247), the first such mural on this campus.

The University of St. Thomas owns a shopping center which formerly had the Black Labrador, which served British cuisine and alcohol. After the restaurant closed in 2021, St. Thomas repurposed the space as a university-managed alumni center using the same decorations.

=== St. Mary's Seminary ===
The school of theology is in St. Mary's Seminary.

=== Conroe ===
The first phase of the Conroe campus is to open in fall 2020, with the Old Conroe Police building as a temporary site for up to three years. The permanent campus is proposed to be at Deison Technology Park. Class of 1952 alumnus Vincent D’Amico offered the university 50 acres (20 ha) of land in east Montgomery County for the project.

=== Saint John Paul II Institute ===
The Saint John Paul II Institute at University of St. Thomas offers comprehensive study of the thought of John Paul II, including travel to Poland.

== Students and alumni ==
The university currently maintains a population of 1,609 traditional undergraduate students and 1,973 graduate students. Adding to this number are non-traditional, off-campus, study-abroad, special program, and seminary students that bring the grand total to 3,582 students.

UST enrolls a diverse group of students with 61% of the total number of students African-American, Hispanic, Asian/Pacific Islander, or American Indian. UST also maintains a student body that is at least 25% Hispanic. The Hispanic Association of Colleges and Universities rates UST as an Hispanic-serving institution; it is the only private institution of higher education in Houston to earn this rating. 58% of the total enrollment is Catholic. In 2019, the university was designated by the Department of Education as an Asian-Serving Institution University students come from 40 states throughout the U.S. as well as 54 countries around the world.

== Athletics ==
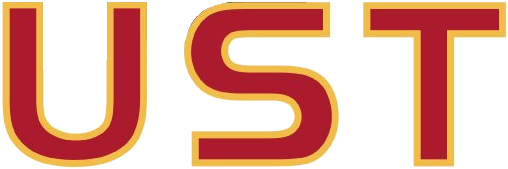
St. Thomas athletics monogram

The St. Thomas (UST) athletic teams called are the Celts. The university is a member of the Division III level of the National Collegiate Athletic Association (NCAA), primarily competing in the Southern Collegiate Athletic Conference (SCAC) as a provisional member since the 2019–20 academic year. The Celts previously competed in the Red River Athletic Conference (RRAC) at the National Association of Intercollegiate Athletics (NAIA) from 2011–12 to 2018–19; as well as an NAIA Independent within the Association of Independent Institutions (AII) from 2007–08 to 2010–11.

UST competes in 16 intercollegiate varsity sports: Men's sports include baseball, basketball, cross country, golf, soccer, tennis and track & field; while women's sports include basketball, cross country, golf, soccer, softball, tennis, track & field and volleyball; and co-ed sports include cheerleading.

== Student life ==
=== Residential housing ===
The university has three types of campus housing, both under the direction of Residence Life.

Guinan Residence Hall is a three-story, 306-bed facility with private double-occupancy rooms. It is located near the Moran Parking Center and Crooker Center and provides a residential experience focused on community living.

Apartment-style housing, located on the south side of campus, offers apartments to upper-class students and graduate or adult students who want to benefit from a Residence Life community.

Households are intentional Catholic communities of students that live, study, and pray together. They are housed in the local townhomes on campus or in Young Hall.

=== Neewollah ===
An annual tradition dating back more than 50 years is the "Neewollah" Party (Halloween spelled backwards), held every year in October. Hundreds of students dress up in costume and party on campus as various local bands and DJs provide music. Students compete for prizes in costume and dance contests. The event draws about 600 people and is held on Crooker Patio, a large area in front of the university's dining hall.

=== Other campus events ===
- Cinco de Mayo Celebration
- Houston Italian Festival
- International Festival
- Spring Formal
- Salsa Night
- Texas Independence Day Celebration

== Student organizations ==
The Executive Student Organization (ESO) is a collective of student leaders from seven major organizations that oversee many areas of student life. The ESO is presided over by the Student Body President. All ESO members have an administrative or faculty adviser. The ESO holds jurisdiction and management over all funds that are accumulated through the Student Activity Fee.

The university acknowledges 82 student organizations. Honor Societies and Academic Clubs are often overseen by their departments, but some seek student government approval for financial purposes. Other organizations are under the directorship of administrative offices such as Campus Ministry. Others include the Knights of Columbus, Catholic Daughters of the Americas Court of St. Macrina, Legion of Mary, and over 20 department-run honor societies.

=== Publications ===
- Laurels literary magazine publishes poems, short fiction, and other creative writing submitted by enrolled students. It is led by three appointed editors. During the fall, the three editors are responsible for the administration and editing of the issue. However, a curriculum-approved Literary magazine class, in cooperation with the editors, is responsible for the spring issue.
- Thoroughfare magazine is the newest publication on campus. Modeled after The New Yorker as a "features" magazine, it highlights students, organizations, events, places, and local occurrences in Houston. It is led by an appointed student editor-in-chief with the help of a student staff.

== Notables ==
=== Alumni ===
- Mayo Thompson c. 1969 – musician, visual artist, founder of art-rock band Red Krayola
- Cecilia Phalen Abbott c. 1980 - First Lady of Texas
- Barbara Olson c. 1977 - attorney, political commentator, killed in the hijacking of American Airlines Flight 77 that was flown into the Pentagon during the September 11 attacks
- Sean Patrick Flanery c. 1985 – actor (The Boondock Saints, Powder, The Young Indiana Jones Chronicles), instructor of Brazilian Jiu-Jitsu, and author
- The Undertaker c. 1984 - professional wrestler
- Vanessa Leggett c. 1992 - journalist, author, and First Amendment advocate, jailed by the Justice Department for refusing to provide confidential source material in a federal murder-for-hire case
- Dariusz Mioduski c. 1987 - Polish businessman, owner of Legia Warsaw FC
- Daniella Guzman c. 2004 - Journalist and News Anchor
- Afowiri Fondzenyuy c 2011- social entrepreneur and charity fundraiser

=== Faculty ===
- Marshall Applewhite, chair of the music department from 1965 to 1970, founder of the Heaven's Gate cult.
- John Deely, Rudman Chair of Graduate Philosophy at the Center for Thomistic Studies.
