= Suite 8F Group =

The Suite 8F Group, also referred to as the 8F Crowd, was a network of politically active businessmen in Texas from the 1930s into the 1960s. "Suite 8F" refers to Herman Brown's suite at the Lamar Hotel in Houston. Herman Brown, one of the co-founders of the construction firm Brown and Root, made his primary home in Austin until 1948. With the company headquarters in Houston, Brown typically traveled from Austin once per week, then stayed at his room at the Lamar for a few days. Gus Wortham, another member of the group, lived in the room next door, 7F. Jesse H. Jones, the developer and owner of the Lamar Hotel, lived on its top floor and was also a member of the group.

Herman Brown, and his brother, George R. Brown, used their suite in the Lamar Hotel as a social, business, and political club. They planned and discussed events as varied as hunting and racing, pipelines and steel plants, and philanthropy and political candidates. James A. Elkins, a Houston lawyer and banker, wielded great influence and gained a reputation as a deal maker. For example, one friend credited Elkins for facilitating the sale of local radio station. Sometimes the group formed a consensus around a political candidate, then supported him as a group. For example, the group backed Oscar Holcombe, Sam Rayburn, and the first two campaigns of Franklin Delano Roosevelt for President of the United States.

According to Texas Monthly, the 8F Crowd had gained "unequaled influence in state and national government" after the end World War II when George R. Brown, Gus Wortham, and Charles Francis of Vinson & Elkins founded Texas Eastern. The group was reported to exercise leverage over Big Oil. The 8F Crowd had connections to various media outlets including the Houston Chronicle, the Houston Post, television station KPRC, and radio stations KPRC and KTRK-TV.

== Membership ==
The core group, or the persons who were active for the longest time, were:

- James Smither Abercrombie, inventor and president of Cameron Iron Works
- George R. Brown, co-founder of Brown and Root
- Herman Brown, co-founder of Brown and Root
- James A. Elkins, banker and co-founder of Vinson & Elkins
- Oveta Culp Hobby, United States Secretary of Health, Education, and Welfare
- William P. Hobby, Texas governor
- Jesse H. Jones, politician and entrepreneur
- R. E. Smith, independent oilman and real estate developer
- Gus Wortham, businessman and Houston civic leader

Other people who reportedly were members of the Suite 8F Group included:

- Edward Clark, US Ambassador to Australia
- John Connally, Governor of Texas
- Thomas Corcoran, legal scholar and advisor to Presidents Franklin D. Roosevelt and Lyndon Baines Johnson
- Hugh Roy Cullen, founder of Quintana Petroleum
- Morgan J. Davis, president of Humble Oil
- Walter G. Hall, banker and Galveston County Democratic political financier
- Lyndon B. Johnson, President of the United States
- Walter Mischer, banker and land developer
- Sam Rayburn, Speaker of the United States House of Representatives
- Albert Thomas, chairman of the House Appropriations Committee, Subcommittee on Defense
- Homer Thornberry, US Representative from Texas and US Judge
- Felix Tijerina, Houston restaurateur, president of League of United Latin American Citizens
- William Vinson, director and general counsel at Great Southern Life Insurance
- Alvin Wirtz, Texas state senator and undersecretary to the Department of the Interior

Suite 8F helped to coordinate the political activities of other right-wing politicians and businessmen based in the South; these included:

- Robert B. Anderson, president of the Texas Mid-Continent Oil and Gas Association, Secretary of the Navy and Secretary of the Treasury
- Bobby Baker, political advisor for the Democratic party
- Lawrence D. Bell, founder of Bell Aircraft Corporation
- Fred Black, lobbyist for North American Aviation
- David Harold Byrd, chairman of Byrd Oil Corporation
- James Eastland US Senator from Mississippi
- Billie Sol Estes, entrepreneur in the cotton industry
- Eugene B. Germany, president of Mustang Oil Company
- H. L. Hunt, oil magnate and founder of Hunt Oil
- Benjamin Everett Jordan US Senator from North Carolina
- Robert Kerr, founder of Kerr-McGee, Governor of Oklahoma, and US Senator
- Fred Korth, president of Continental National Bank and Secretary of the Navy
- Glenn McCarthy, oil prospector and founder of the Shamrock Hotel
- Clint Murchison, Sr., founder of Southern Union Company
- William D. Pawley, US Ambassador to Brazil, US Ambassador to Peru
- Sid Richardson, oil magnate and philanthropist
- Richard Russell, Governor of Georgia and US Senator
- George Smathers, US Representative and US Senator from Florida
- Earl E. T. Smith, US Ambassador to Cuba
- Ross Sterling, co-founder of Humble Oil and Texas Governor
