= Wortham Center =

Wortham Center may refer to:

- Wortham Theater Center, a performing arts center in Houston, Texas
- Wortham Center for the Performing Arts, a performing arts center in Asheville, North Carolina
