= Robert J. Peroni =

American lawyer

Robert J. Peroni is an American lawyer, currently the Fondren Foundation Centennial Chair for Faculty Excellence, previously the Parker C. Fielder Regents Professor and James A. Elkins Centennial Chair at University of Texas School of Law. He was also previously the J. Landis Martin Visiting Professor and Jack N. Pritzker Distinguished Visiting Professor at Northwestern University.
