= James Elkins =

James or Jim Elkins may refer to:

- Jim Elkins (criminal) (1901–1968), crime boss in Portland, Oregon
- James Elkins (art historian) (born 1955), art critic and art historian based in Chicago
- James A. Elkins (1879–1972), lawyer and banker in Houston, Texas
