= Brown Building (Austin, Texas) =

Building in Austin, Texas, U.S.

- U.S. National Register of Historic Places
- Recorded Texas Historic Landmark
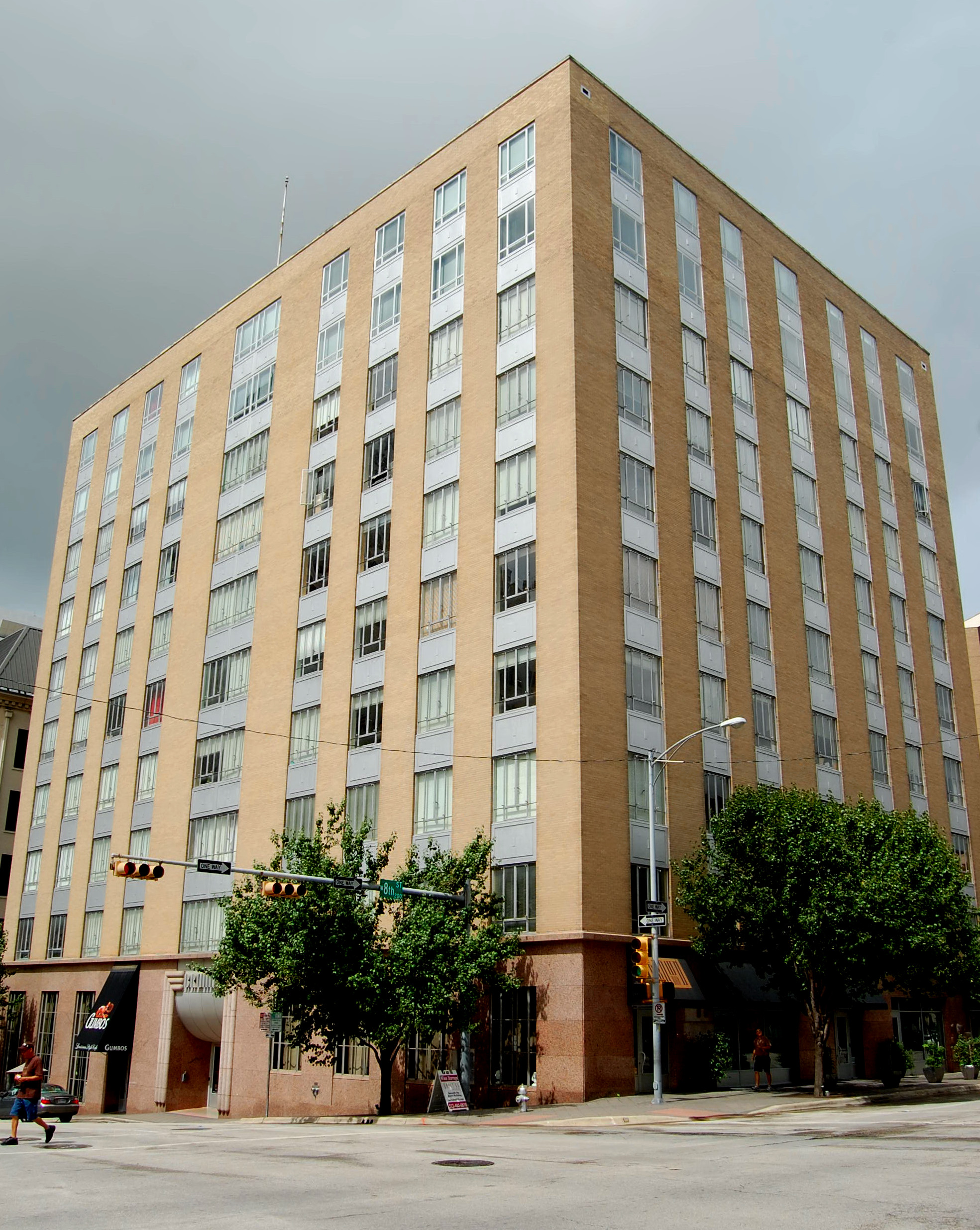
- Location: 710 Colorado St., Austin, Texas, U.S.
- Coordinates: 30°16′12″N 97°44′38″W
- Built: 1938
- Architects: C.H. Page & Son
- Architectural style: Moderne
- NRHP reference No.: 97000364
- RTHL No.: 17512

Significant dates
- Added to NRHP: April 24, 1997
- Designated RTHL: 2013

The Brown Building is a ten-story office and residential tower in Downtown Austin, Texas, United States. It is 137 feet (42 m) tall. Completed in 1938 at the southwest corner of 8th Street and Colorado Street, the building was home to many significant companies throughout 20th century Austin, including the holding corporation for the Lyndon Johnson family. The Texas Broadcasting Corporation (KTBC) operated from the building for many years around World War II, counting among its employees humorist Cactus Pryor and future governor John Connally. The engineering company Brown & Root also had its headquarters in the Brown Building at one time.

The building was renovated and converted to high-end lofts in the early 2000s. The building was added to the National Register of Historic Places in 1997. The building bears the name of its developer, businessman and philanthropist, Herman Brown.
