= JPMorgan Chase Building (Houston) =

Skyscraper in Houston, Texas

JPMorgan Chase & Co. Building
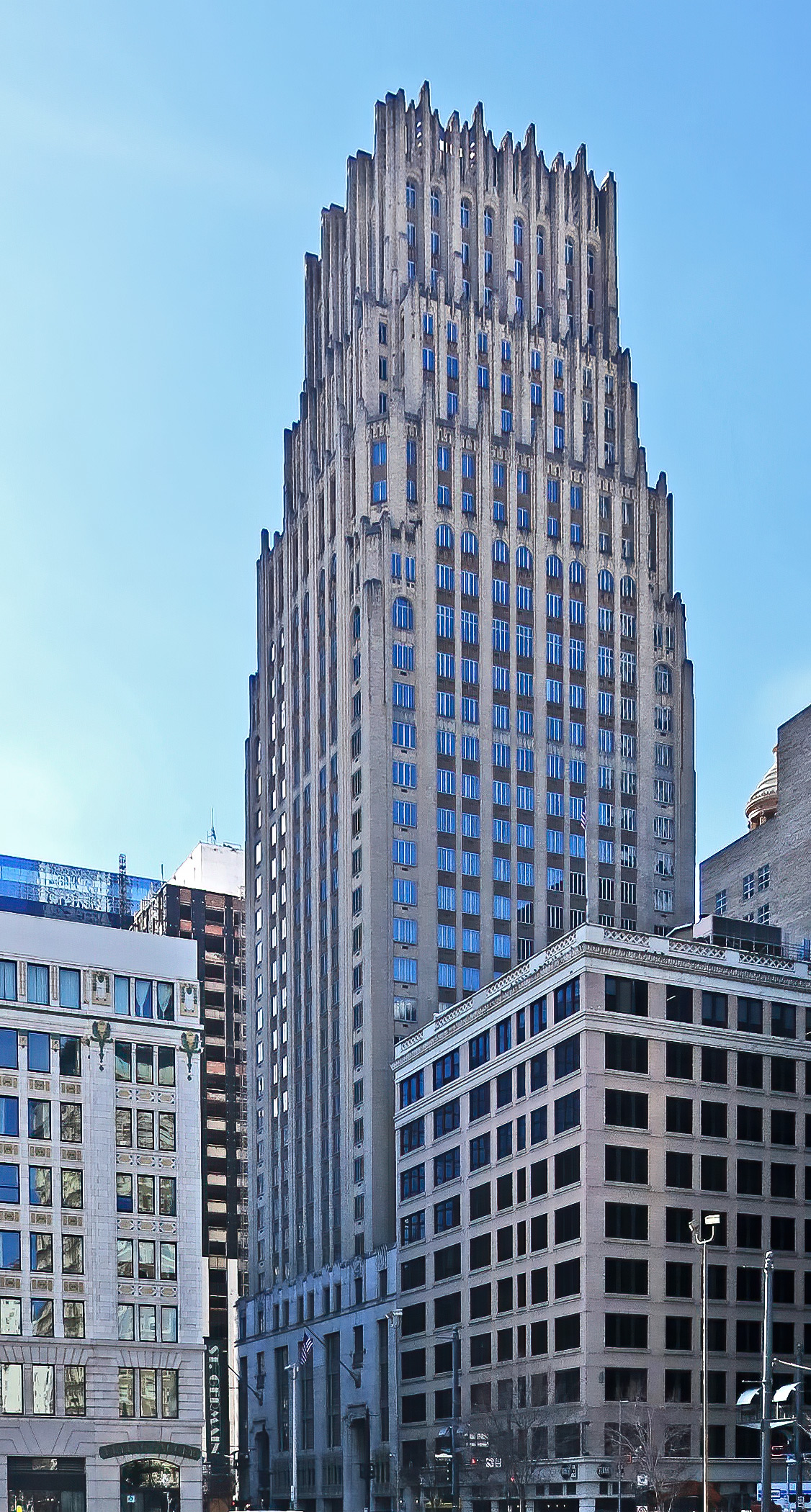
- Interactive map of the JPMorgan Chase & Co. Building area
- Former names: Gulf Building; Texas Commerce Bank Building; Chase Bank Building

General information
- Status: Completed
- Type: Commercial offices
- Architectural style: Art Deco/Art Moderne
- Location: 712 Main Street; Houston, Texas
- Coordinates: 29°45′32″N 95°21′49″W
- Completed: 1929

Height
- Roof: 130 m (430 ft)

Technical details
- Floor count: 37

Design and construction
- Architects: Alfred Charles Finn; Kenneth Franzheim; J.E.R. Carpenter
- Gulf Building
- U.S. National Register of Historic Places
- Recorded Texas Historic Landmark
- NRHP reference No.: 83004436
- RTHL No.: 14042

Significant dates
- Added to NRHP: August 30, 1983
- Designated RTHL: 2007

The JPMorgan Chase Building, formerly the Gulf Building, is a 37-story 130 m (430 ft) Art Deco skyscraper in downtown Houston, Texas. Completed in 1929, it remained the tallest building in Houston until 1963, when the Exxon Building surpassed it in height. The building is the Houston headquarters of JPMorgan Chase Bank, and was formerly the headquarters of Texas Commerce Bank.

== History ==
=== Development of the Site ===
==== Original building ====
Jesse H. Jones, a leader in the development of steel-framed skyscrapers in the 1910s in Houston, commissioned the construction of Gulf's first building in Houston in 1916. The first Gulf Building stood at ten stories and was renamed the Rusk Building after the oil company's departure.

In 1927, Jones started developing an art deco skyscraper for Gulf at the northwest corner of Rusk Avenue and Main Street in Houston, the former site of the Charlotte Baldwin Allen homestead. While Jones usually hired Alfred C. Finn for his major projects, for the design of the Gulf Building, he brought in Kenneth Franzheim, and J. E. R. Carpenter to collaborate. The architects created and considered several designs before choosing one inspired by Eliel Saarinen's second-place-but-acclaimed entry in the Chicago Tribune Tower competition. When Houston hosted the 1928 Democratic National Convention, the superstructure of the Gulf Building was in plain view.

When the Gulf Building was completed in 1929, the 36-story building stood at about 450-feet, making it the tallest skyscraper in Houston, a distinction it enjoyed through 1963. The building was opened for mixed-use. Though most of its space was dedicated to leases for office space, the ground floor was leased for retail, including numerous small shops and the Sakowitz Department Store as its anchor retail tenant. In total, the 25-year-Sakowitz lease of more than 65,000 square feet covered five of the bottom floors. Gulf signed a twenty-year lease for floors seven through nineteen. National Bank of Commerce occupied a vaulted lobby with access from Main and Travis streets, as well as a large space in the basement. Many smaller tenants signed three-to-five year leases.

The facing of the upper floors of the Gulf Building was constructed of "buff tapestry brick," with limestone cladding on the base made of six floors. The Rusk Avenue side of the building was constructed eight bays wide and seven bays wide on its Main Street side. Built in the Manhattan-style of setbacks, the six-story base supported a thirty story tower, with setbacks at the 25th, 28th, and 32nd floors. Ornamentation was an eclectic mix of art deco and Gothic styles.

Jesse H. Jones arranged to have the Gulf Building constructed; it was built in 1929.

=== Renovations ===
The Gulf Oil sign was erected in May 1966 and dismantled in March 1974.

==== Texas Commerce Bank ====
Texas Commerce Bank initiated the restoration of the building in 1989, in what is still considered one of the largest privately funded preservation projects in American history. Recent preservation work included restoring the terrazzo floor in the building's Banking Hall, but keeping the hollows worn into the marble border where generations of customers stood to conduct their banking business. Largely through the efforts of JPMorgan Chase, the former Gulf Building was designated a City of Houston Landmark in 2003. The structure was already a National Historic Civil Engineering Landmark and listed on the National Register of Historic Places.

Texas Commerce Bank also owned another history-making skyscraper in downtown Houston, the neighboring 75-story Texas Commerce Tower, completed in 1982, and now known as the JPMorgan Chase Tower.

==== Brookfield Asset Management ====
In 2010, Brookfield Real Estate Opportunity Fund acquired the former Gulf Building from JPMorgan Chase as part of a large divestment of real estate by the bank of sixteen large properties nationwide. Meanwhile, part of the deal included a leaseback of sixty percent of the office space of the JPMorgan Building by the bank, where it continued to maintain its Houston headquarters.

On August 30, 2010, an alarm was called at about 8pm for a fire on the 27th floor. The Houston Fire Department responded with 3 alarms and 270 men. The fire was officially extinguished at 11:20 pm. Due to a broken pipe, HFD had to pipe water directly into the building. During the course of extinguishing the blaze, six firefighters were injured. They were taken to a local hospital and later released.

== Building features ==
The building has a total of 800,000 sq ft (74,000 m^{2}) of space. On the ground floor the building has a 15,000 sq ft (1,400 m^{2}) retail banking center. The banking center has 43 ft (13 m) ceilings, floors and walls made of marble, and large stained glass windows. The building once had a rotating illuminated Gulf sign on the top, which was removed in March 1974.

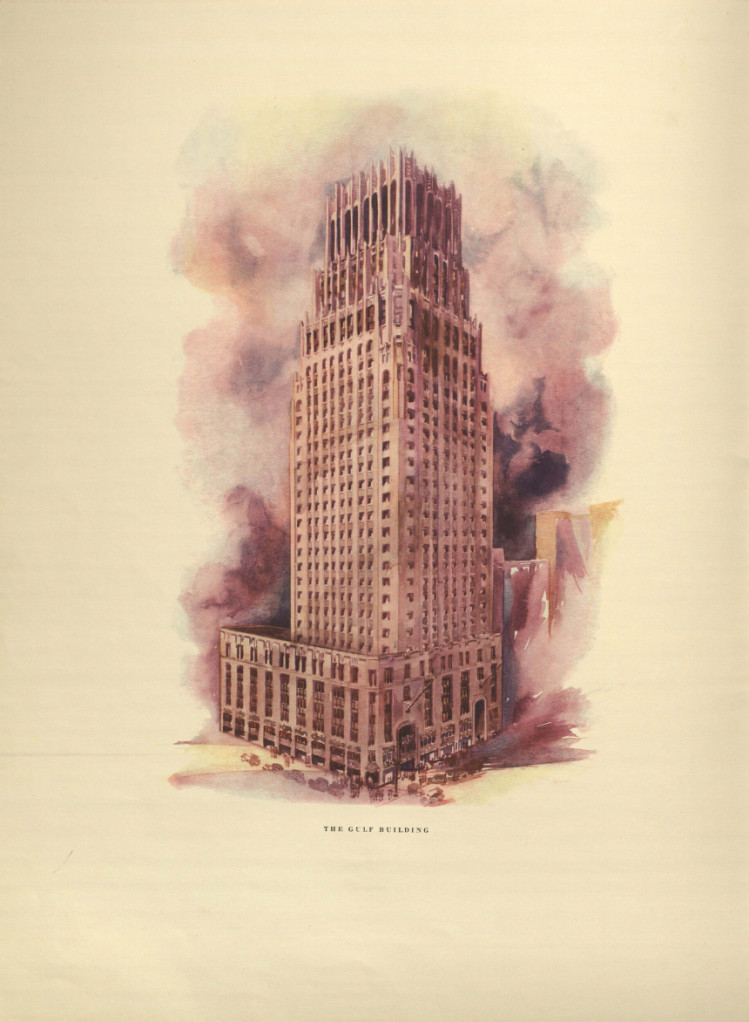
Illustration of Gulf Building, 1929

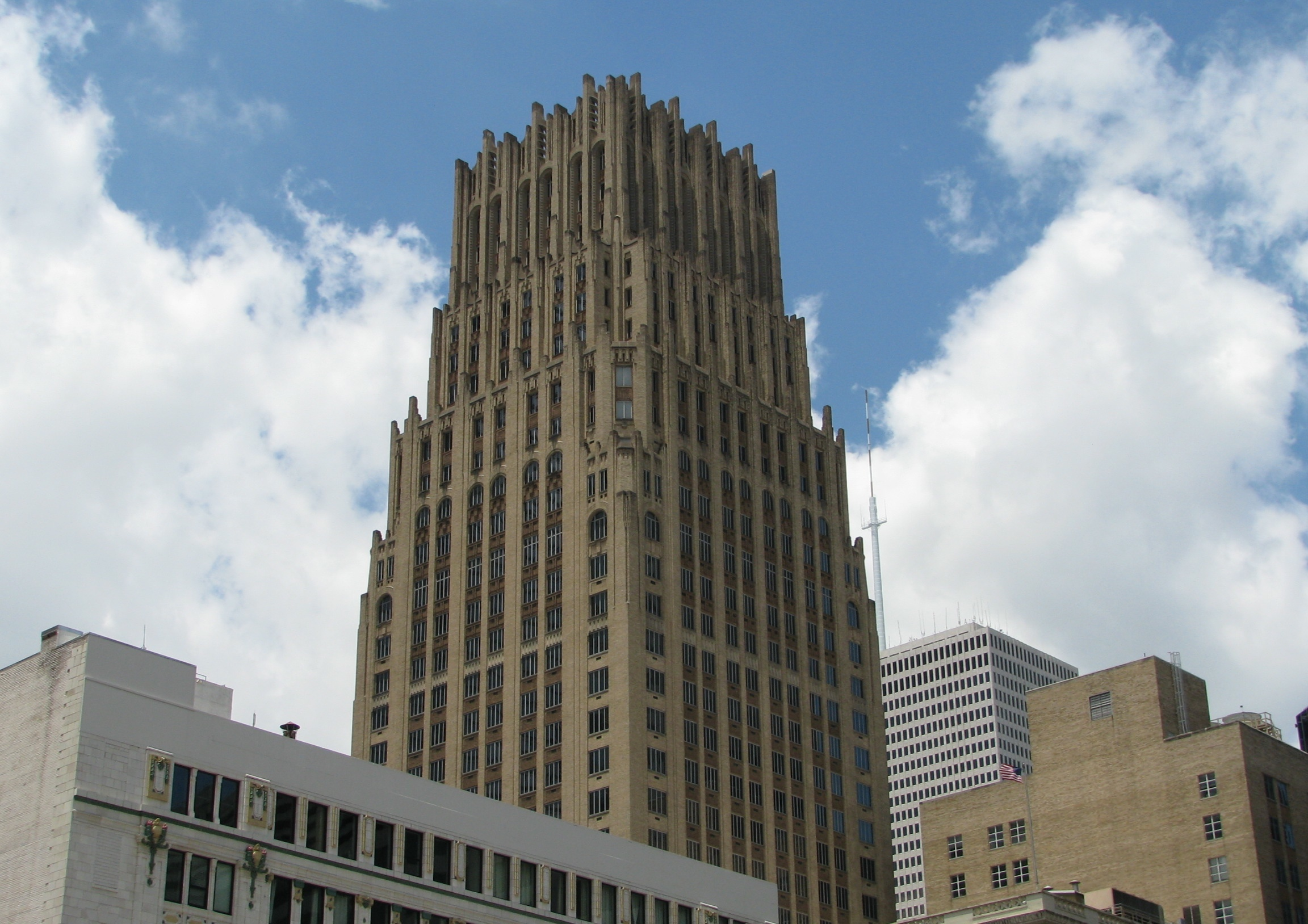

== See also ==
- Architecture of Houston

== Bibliography ==
- Bradley, Barrie Scardino (2020). Improbable Metropolis: Houston's Architectural and Urban History. Austin: University of Texas Press. ISBN 978-1-4773-2019-8.
- Eaves, Barbara (2006). "Gulf Building: Renovate or Raze?" (PDF). Houston History Magazine. 3 (2): 10–15.
- Fenberg, Steven (2011). Unprecedented Power: Jesse Jones, Capitalism, and the Common Good. College Station: Texas A & M University Press. ISBN 978-1-60344-434-7 – via Project MUSE.
- Fox, Stephen (2012). AIA Houston Architectural Guide (Third ed.). Houston: American Institute of Architects, Houston Chapter. ISBN 978-0-615-66959-5.
