= J. Evans Attwell =

American lawyer (1931–2007)

- Born: March 25, 1931; Houston, Texas, U.S.
- Died: October 27, 2007 (aged 76); Houston, Texas, U.S.
- Occupation: Lawyer
- Employer: Vinson & Elkins
- Known for: Youngest managing partner

Joseph Evans Attwell (March 25, 1931 – October 27, 2007) was the youngest managing partner of Vinson & Elkins, the largest law firm in Texas and the largest single law office in the world, from 1981 to 1991.

He lived in Houston, Texas all his life, and was an owner of the Houston Rockets from 1986 to 1995 and Houston Astros from 1978 to 1994. He was the Chairman of the Board of the Welch Foundation from 2005 until his death. Mr. Attwell also served on the board of American General Corporation for 40 years (now AIG), the board of Ocean Energy (now Devon Energy) and many other Fortune 500 and charitable boards. He was a two time Chairman of the Harris County Hospital District Board, the second largest county hospital district in the world. Attwell served as a Trustee of Rice University where the J. Evans Attwell-Welch postdoctoral fellowships honor his name at the University's Center for Nanoscale Science and Technology. He was awarded Rice's Gold Medal for extraordinary service to the University in 1997.

He married Mary Petersen in March 1956. They had five children and six grandchildren, one of whom is named after him.
