= Eleanor Swift =

American legal scholar

Eleanor Swift, October 16, 1945 - September 20, 2023, was a professor at the University of California, Berkeley School of Law. She was best known for her work on the theory of evidence, and additionally taught civil procedure, the legal profession, and periodic seminars.

== Early career ==
Eleanor Swift graduated from the University of Chicago Laboratory High School. Upon graduating from Yale Law School, Eleanor Swift clerked for Judge M. Joseph Blumenfeld of the U.S. District Court in Hartford and for Chief Judge David L. Bazelon of the U.S. Court of Appeals for the D.C. Circuit. She then practiced in Houston with the firm of Vinson & Elkins.

== At Boalt ==
Swift joined the Boalt faculty in 1979. She served as associate dean at Boalt from 1998 to 2000. She was also chair of the Committee on Professional Development of the Association of American Law Schools and was a past chair of the Evidence Section. From 1992 to 1997, she chaired a special faculty-student committee appointed by Dean Herma Hill Kay to develop a proposal for improving and expanding the clinical curriculum at Boalt. In 1998 she received Boalt's Rutter Award for Teaching Distinction and in 2000 she received UC Berkeley's Distinguished Teaching Award.

The focus of her teaching and research was on the adversary system: the legal rules, practices, and procedures that govern civil and criminal trials. She taught courses in Civil Procedure, Evidence, and the Legal Profession.

Swift incorporated three perspectives in her classes: theoretical, professional, and ethical. "My aim," she said, "is to introduce students to the practice of law under a system of rules, to develop their ability to critique those rules, and to enable them to experience the ethical dilemmas of lawyers acting in role."

Students consistently pointed to the effect her teaching has had on their lives. A former student said, "It would be easy for me to say that I went to the Eleanor Swift School of Law. . . .The lasting imprint of her message makes me use my legal education to make the world a slightly better place. I could never thank her enough for her instruction."

Student course evaluations pointed to the demanding nature of the course: "Evidence is a conceptually difficult course, but her teaching brought out clear thinking," says one student. Says another, "I think this topic is pretty complex and difficult, which makes the instructor and class materials all the more impressive."

One of Professor Swift's most lasting contributions to the Law School's teaching mission was her leadership in the establishment of Boalt's Center for Clinical Education," which brought clients in need of legal advice to Boalt, where students, directed by a faculty member, provided counsel.

== Swift v. Boalt ==
Swift was originally denied tenure at Boalt Hall in 1987. She initiated a suit against the University alleging sex discrimination in her tenure review process. The suit was settled with an agreement to leave the tenure decision to an outside independent review committee of distinguished academics. This committee unanimously recommended that she be promoted to tenure, which finally happened in the fall of 1989.

She wrote about this experience in Becoming a Plaintiff, 4 Berkeley Women's L.J. 245 (1990).

== Statement of Teaching Philosophy ==
"The courses that I teach at the School of Law—Civil Procedure, Evidence, and Legal Profession—all focus on the adversary system. My goal is, of course, to develop students' knowledge of the legal rules, practices and procedures that govern civil and criminal trials. Equally important, however, is that students understand how these rules establish roles for the participants in the adversary system — the lawyers, their clients, the judge and the jury. I develop opportunities for students to learn how lawyers function in resolving individual and societal disputes, and to critique this function from theoretical, professional, and ethical perspectives.

"Taking a theoretical perspective on the rules of the adversary system requires examination of the core values—truth (or rectitude of decision), fairness, efficiency and finality—that underlie our procedural justice system. The rules are carefully examined and debated with regard to their efficacy in promoting these values. Since these core values are often in tension, alternatives are explored and compromises are evaluated.

"A professional perspective on legal rules integrates both theory and practice. Students are introduced to acting in the lawyers' and judge's roles through specific role-playing techniques that I have incorporated into all of my classes. These techniques permit discussion of ethical dilemmas in the lawyer's role to arise naturally in class.

"The ethical perspective emphasizes the importance of the lawyer's responsibility to the client within the adversary system. Law students tend to think of lawyers as "in charge" and it is important to expose them to the constraints on their autonomy created by a representational relationship. My aim is to introduce students to various other role dilemmas, to the incomplete answers provided by our codes of professional ethics, and hence to their own responsibility to develop their individual moral commitments both in and out of role. Finally, I also address the ethical obligation of the legal profession to provide access to our system of justice.

"The practice of law is challenging precisely because it is constantly working out the tension in the core values of the justice system. Legal education must train students to think competently and critically not only about the content of the law and legal rules, but also about the lawyer's role as a professional, with obligations to others, including the legal system in general, beyond self-interest. In law teaching, it is easy to focus almost exclusively on content, but to do so would be to fail in our own professional responsibility."

== Publications ==
Swift's publications included "One Hundred Years of Evidence Law Reform: Thayer's Triumph" in the California Law Review (2000); "Rival Claims to 'Truth'" in Hastings Law Journal (1998); and Evidence: Text, Problems and Cases, 2nd ed. (with Allen and Kuhns, 1997).
