= Fred Korth =

American military officer (1909–1998)

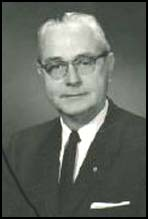

57th United States Secretary of the Navy
- In office January 4, 1962 – November 1, 1963
- President: John F. Kennedy
- Preceded by: John Connally
- Succeeded by: Paul B. Fay (Acting)

Personal details
- Born: Frederick Herman Korth; September 9, 1909 Yorktown, Texas, U.S.
- Died: September 14, 1998 (aged 89) El Paso, Texas, U.S.
- Party: Democratic
- Spouses: Vera Sansom Connell (m. 1934; div. 1964) Charlotte Marguerite Brooks (m. 1980)
- Education: University of Texas, Austin (BA); George Washington University (LLB)

Frederick Herman Korth (September 9, 1909 – September 14, 1998) served as the 56th U.S. Secretary of the Navy during 1962–63; he was also an Assistant Secretary of the Army in 1952–53.

Appointed as Navy Secretary by President John F. Kennedy on January 4, 1962, Korth resigned October 14, 1963, effective November 1, 1963. He resigned in protest due to the Pentagon's refusal to buy atomic engines for a new aircraft carrier.

== Life and career ==
Korth was born in September 1909 in Yorktown, Texas, the son of Eleanor Maria (Stark) and Fritz R. J. Korth, who was a banker and rancher. In later life, he lived in Coronado Country Club Estates, El Paso, Texas and Foxhall, Washington, D.C.

He was president of the Continental National Bank of Fort Worth, Texas. Continental National Bank was one of a number of banks that participated in a line of credit for the TFX (Tactical Fighter Experimental)―later known as the F-111―the contract for which had been awarded to General Dynamics (formerly Convair) of Fort Worth. When asked about this alleged conflict of interest at a press conference, President Kennedy responded, "...I have no evidence that Mr. Korth acted in any way improperly in the TFX matter....I have no evidence that Mr. Korth benefited improperly during his term of office in the Navy, and I have no evidence, and you have not, as I understand the press has not produced any, nor the McClellan Committee, which would indicate that in any way he acted improperly in the TFX. I have always believed that innuendoes should be justified before they are made, either by me and the Congress, or even in the press." A commentary in the May, 1985 edition of Proceedings magazine exonerates Korth for any improprieties relating to the awarding of TFX.

When he was not serving in the above public or private sector capacities, Fred Korth was a lawyer in private practice. One of his better known cases was a small one heard June 24, 1948 in the County of Tarrant, Texas, when his client, Edwin A. Ekdahl, was officially divorced from Marguerite Frances Claverie Ekdahl (also known as Marguerite Oswald), whose son from a previous marriage was Lee Harvey Oswald. Following the end of Korth's first marriage in 1964, he began a romantic relationship with heiress and socialite Marjorie Merriweather Post, daughter of breakfast-cereal magnate C. W. Post, twenty years his senior. He was a co-executor of Post's will. Part of her estate was her mansion on Palm Beach Island, Mar-a-Lago, that was bequeathed to the National Park Service. It was returned to the Post Foundation by the US Government in 1980 and was ultimately purchased by Donald Trump in 1985.

On August 23, 1980, he wed widowed Charlotte Brooks Williams. Korth died in September 1998 in El Paso, Texas and is buried under a three-century-old Texas Live Oak tree on his ranch in Karnes County, Texas.

His stepdaughter, Melissa Williams O'Rourke, was the mother of former U.S. Representative Beto O'Rourke.

== See also ==
- Suite 8F Group

Government offices
Preceded by John B. Connally, Jr	United States Secretary of the Navy; January 4, 1962 – November 1, 1963	Succeeded by Paul B. Fay
