= Moody Memorial Library =

Library in Texas, USA

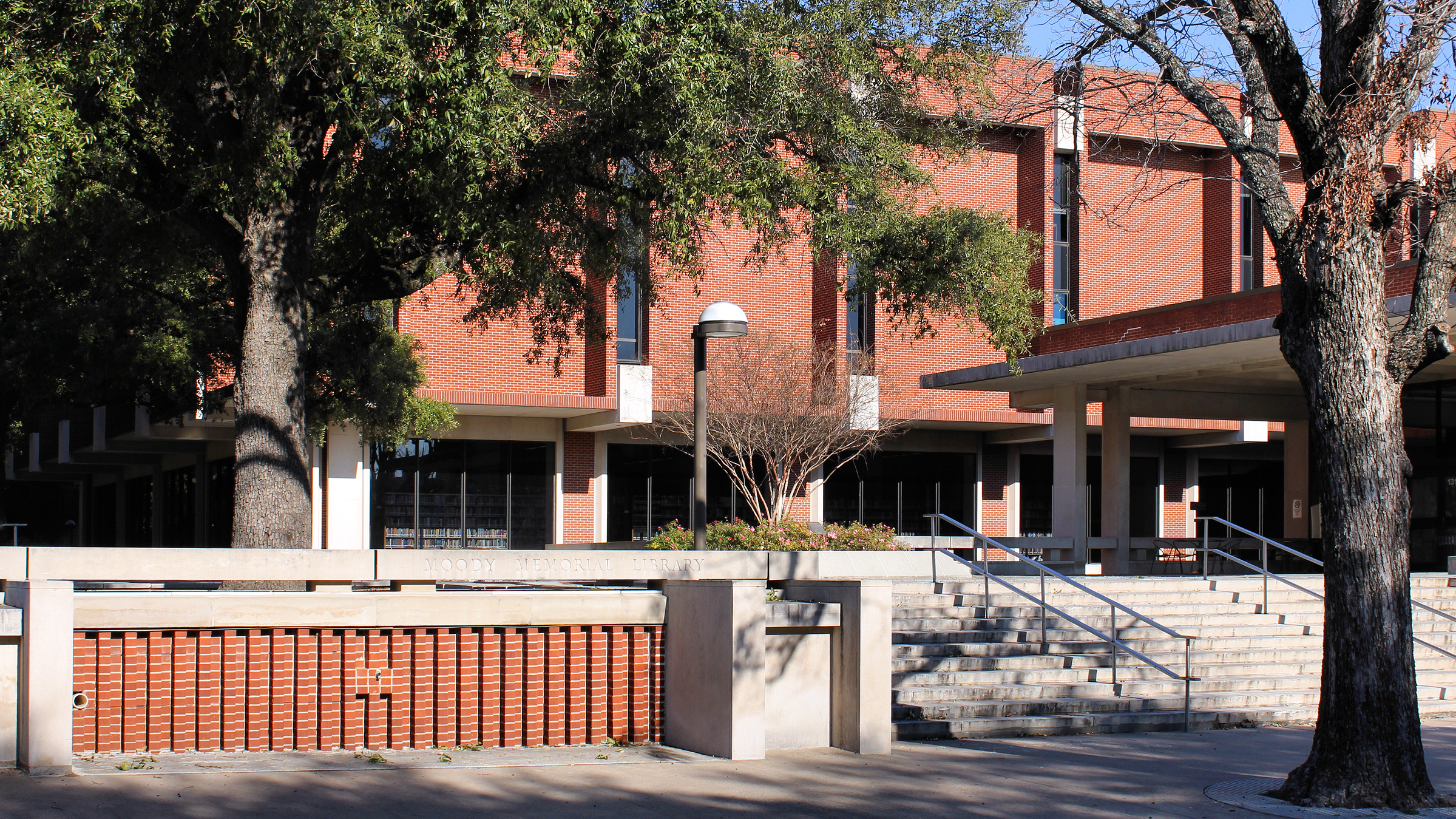
- Moody Memorial Library
- 31.54888°N 97.11833°W
- Location: Waco, Texas, United States
- Type: Academic library
- Established: 1968
- Architect: Jarvis Putty Jarvis

Other information
- Affiliation: Baylor University
- Website: library.web.baylor.edu/moodyjones

Moody Memorial Library is one of the two central libraries at Baylor University located in Waco, Texas. Jesse H. Jones Library is connected to Moody by two hallways and serves as the second of the two central libraries at Baylor. Moody is the larger of the two central libraries. These two libraries serve as the main research complexes of the university. The Moody Library Special Collections hold over 50,000 volumes dating from the 11th century and include rare books, manuscripts, book arts, scholars’ libraries, archives, and music.

== History ==
Moody Memorial Library opened its doors on September 17, 1968, after making a move from Carroll Library, which was built in 1906. The library was named in honor of a generous gift from the Moody Foundation of Galveston. the Moody Memorial Library building was a much-needed expansion of Baylor’s physical plant and a crucial element in a long-range plan called Projection 68 that sought to grow the university’s physical footprint and enhance its reputation as an institution of higher education.
