= Gus Sessions Wortham =

American businessman (1891–1976)

Gus Sessions Wortham (February 18, 1891 – September 1, 1976), was a businessman and civic leader in Houston, Texas.

== Biography ==
He was born on February 18, 1891, in Mexia, Texas, to John Lee Wortham and Fannie Sessions. He moved with his father to Houston and opened John L. Wortham and Son, an insurance agency. Eleven years later he founded the American General Insurance Company with Jesse H. Jones, James A. Elkins, and John W. Link. American General was acquired by American International Group on August 29, 2001.

Wortham served two terms as president of the Houston Chamber of Commerce, and he and his wife, Lyndall Finley Wortham, created the Wortham Foundation which supports cultural activities and development of parks in the Houston area. Named in honor of the Worthams are the Wortham Center, which is home of the Houston Ballet and the Houston Grand Opera, Gus Wortham Park, Gus Wortham memorial fountain, Wortham IMAX Theater at the Houston Museum of Natural Science, Wortham World of Primates at the Houston Zoo, Lyndall Finley Wortham Theatre at the University of Houston, and Wortham Tower in the American General Center.

Wortham's daughter Diana Wortham is a philanthropist who contributed to Pack Place in Asheville, North Carolina, where the Diana Wortham Theatre is named for her.

He died on September 1, 1976.

The family home, the Wortham House, was donated by the Wortham Foundation on behalf of Lyndall Wortham to the University of Houston as a residence for the university's system chancellor who, by contract, must reside in the Wortham House during their tenure.
