= Jesse H. Jones Library =

Library of Baylor University in Texas

Coordinates: 31.5496°N 97.1169°W

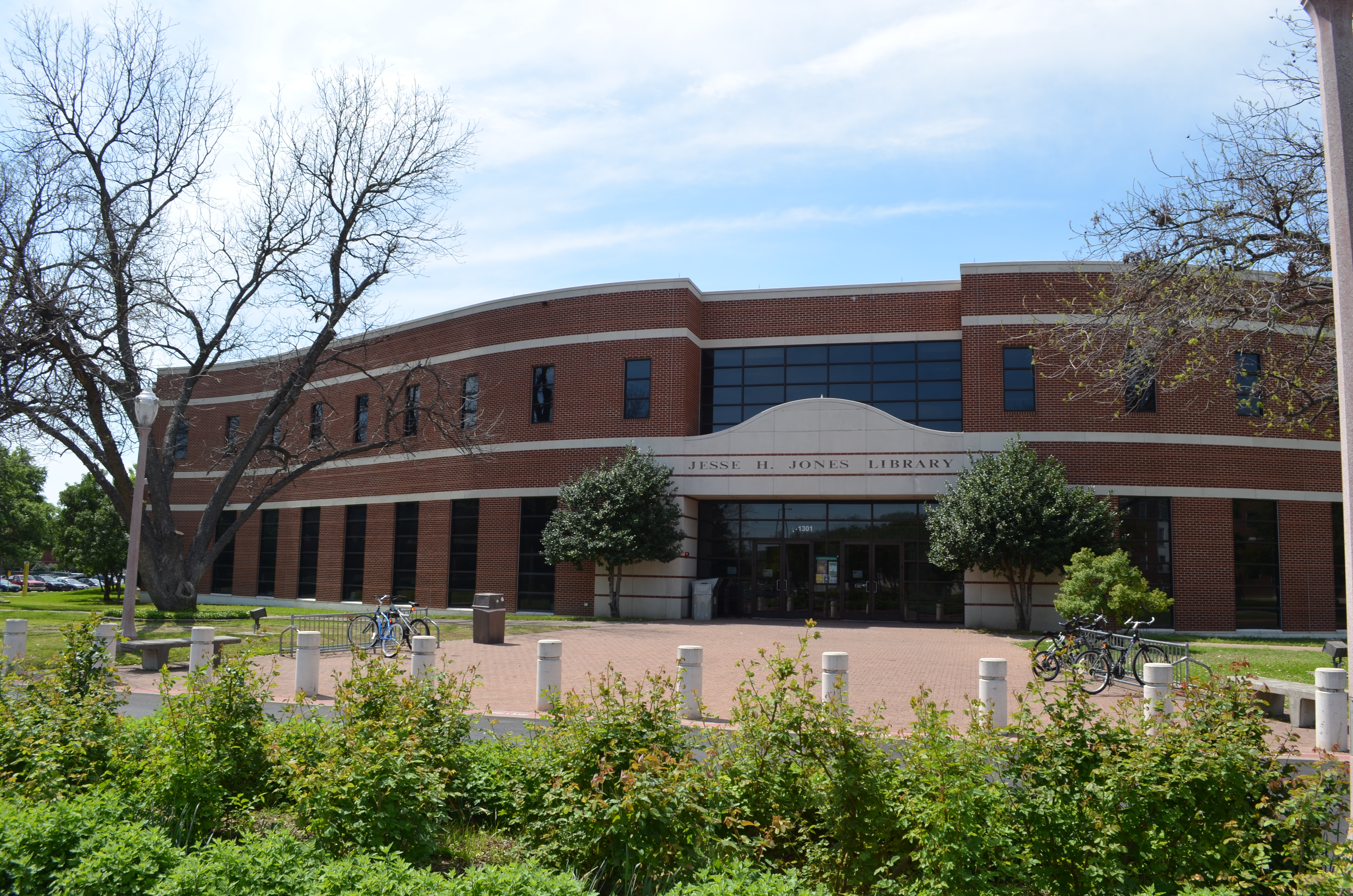
Jesse H. Jones Library

Jesse H. Jones Library is one of the central libraries at Baylor University in Waco, Texas. Built in 1992, Jones is smaller than the other central library, Moody Memorial Library. Jones connects with Moody by way of hallways on both the first and second floors.
