= Texas Commerce Bank =

Former Texas-based bank

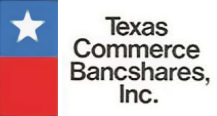
Texas Commerce Bancshares, Inc. Logo

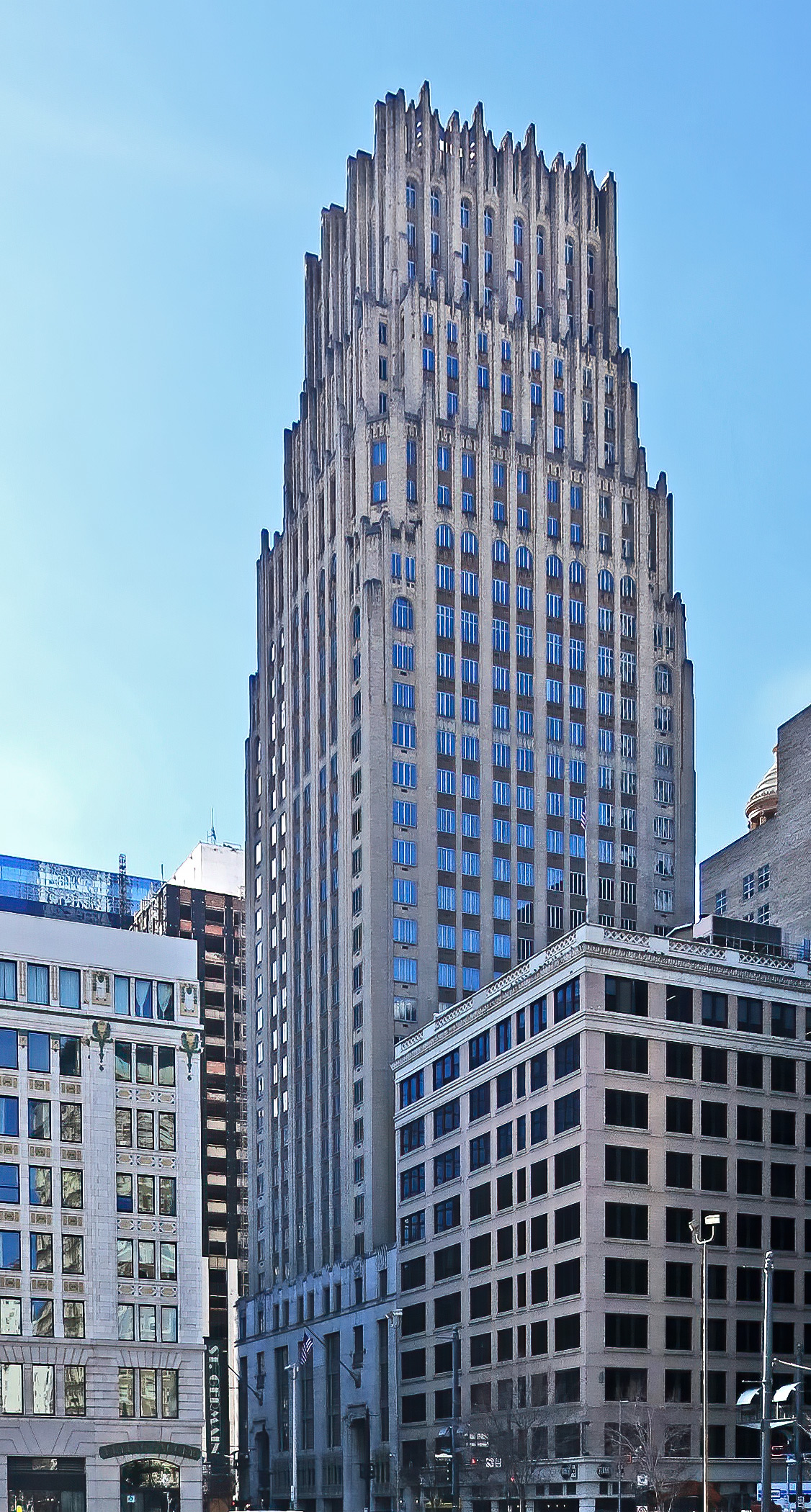
JPMorgan Chase Building (formerly Gulf Building), the headquarters of the bank

The Texas Commerce Bank (officially Texas Commerce Bank N.A., with its parent bank holding company known as Texas Commerce Bancshares, Inc.) was a Texas-based bank acquired by Chemical Banking Corporation of New York in May 1987. The acquisition was valued at an estimated $1.19 billion when the Federal Reserve approved it in March 1987, narrowly short of the most expensive bank merger in history, Fleet Financial Group's $1.3 billion deal for Norstar Bancorp announced the week before. The bank had its headquarters in what is now the JPMorgan Chase Building (formerly Gulf Building) in downtown Houston.

Prior to the merger, interstate banking was illegal in Texas and many other states, which effectively prevented such cross-border mergers. Texas and New York had changed their laws to allow a merger of an in-state bank and an out-of-state bank. Without those changes to the law, the merger between Chemical Bank and Texas Commerce Bank, and later Chase Manhattan Bank would not have been possible.

Through a series of mergers and acquisitions Chemical Bank bought Chase Manhattan Bank and then JP Morgan finally changed Texas Commerce to JPMorgan Chase & Co.

== History ==
The Texas Commerce Bank, formerly known as Texas National Bank of Commerce Houston, was a product of the 1964 merger of the National Bank of Commerce and the Texas National Bank. Texas Commerce changed its name to Chase Bank of Texas in 1998 and merged into The Chase Manhattan Bank in 2000.

In 1977, Lady Bird (Claudia Taylor) Johnson (wife of President Lyndon Baines Johnson) became a director of Texas Commerce Bank and Texas Commerce Bancshares in Houston. Other directors were former President Gerald Ford, former U.S. Representative Barbara Jordan and the Odessa oil industrialist Bill Noël. At one time Ken Lay of Enron was a director. Past presidents of the bank include Thomas E. Locke of Lubbock.

Jeb Bush's career started with an entry-level position in the international division of the Texas Commerce Bank, a job he received through James A. Baker, III, a longtime family friend and chairman of the board. Bush assisted in drafting communications for the company's chairman, Ben Love. In November 1977 he was sent to the Venezuelan capital of Caracas to open a new operation for the bank. Bush spent about two years there, working in international finance. He eventually worked for the bank's executive program.

The New York City based Chemical Bank acquired Texas Commerce in 1987, and through a series of various mergers over the years, is now part of the present-day JPMorgan Chase.

References: Lady Bird Johnson, Director, Texas Commerce Bank - Lady Bird (Claudia Taylor) Johnson | Scholastic
