= Vinson & Elkins =

American law firm

Vinson & Elkins LLP
- Headquarters: Texas Tower, Downtown Houston, Texas, U.S.
- Major practice areas: Transactions, Mergers & Acquisitions, Litigation, Regulatory, Tax, Oil & Gas Law, Intellectual Property, Restructuring & Bankruptcy
- Key people: Chair, Keith Fullenweider; Vice Chairs Jim Fox, Michael Holmes and Hilary Preston
- Date founded: 1917
- Founder: James A. Elkins and William A. Vinson
- Company type: Limited liability partnership
- Website: www.velaw.com

Vinson & Elkins LLP (or V&E) is an American multinational law firm headquartered in Houston, Texas. Founded in 1917 during a historic Texas oil boom, the firm employs over 700 lawyers worldwide across fourteen offices in major international energy, financial, and political centers. V&E is globally regarded for its energy, infrastructure, and corporate practices, and has been ranked the top law firm in Texas for ten consecutive years and the top law firm for Energy, Oil & Gas for thirteen consecutive years.

== History ==
=== Founding ===
The firm was founded in Houston, Texas, in 1917 by Judge James A. Elkins and William A. Vinson.

=== Leadership ===
In May 2021, it was announced that the firm elected current partners Keith Fullenweider as chair and Jim Fox, Michael Holmes and Hilary Preston as vice chairs. The change took effect on January 1, 2022. Vinson & Elkins was named a top-ranked firm and best law firm to work for in Vault's 2024 Associate Survey.

=== Practice areas ===
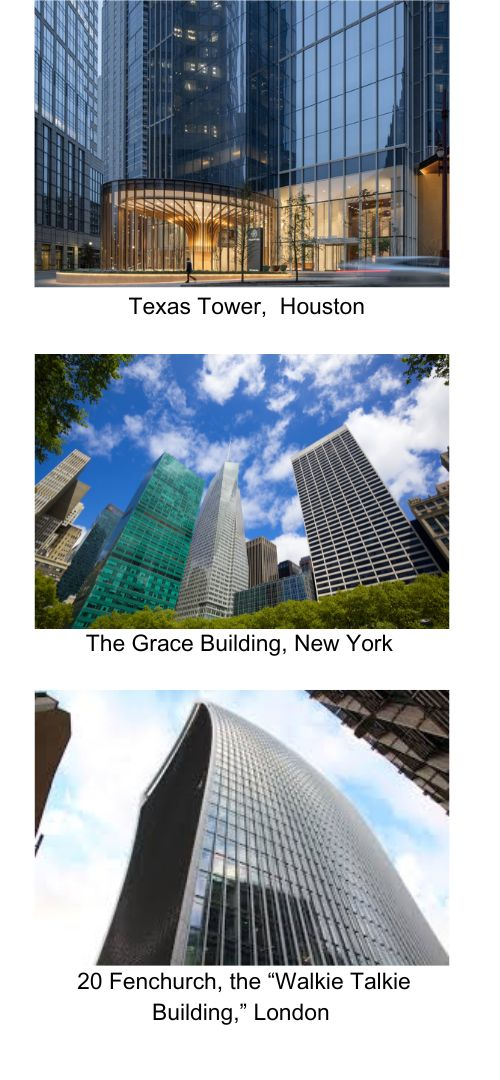
Vinson & Elkins' offices in Houston, New York and London.

The firm practices in numerous legal fields, particularly those that pertain to the energy industry, with more than 400 lawyers involved in energy-related legal work. The firm was rated the most prestigious firm in Texas for the fifth year in a row, as well as for having the nation’s strongest practice for Energy, Oil, & Gas for the eighth consecutive year. The firm is highly ranked within Chamber and Partners legal rankings as a leading firm in Corporate and Tax areas, collectively achieving 16 Band 1 practice rankings in the 2023 guide. The firm’s Litigation and Regulatory Department was recognized in 24 practice categories. The firm is recognized as "The World's Leading Energy Law Firm" by Euromoney Magazine (1995–present.) In 2023, Chambers & Partners recognized V&E globally, as the leader in Projects & Energy: Oil & Gas. In 2024, Who's Who Legal: Arbitration identified six partners, Camilo Cardozo, James Loftis, Louise Woods, Scott Stiegler, Nick Henchie and counsel Robert Landicho as leaders in the arbitration arena. in 2024, Lawdragon recognized eight Vinson & Elkins lawyers among the world's 500 leading cybersecurity lawyers. In 2025, Lawdragon recognized 10 of the firm's lawyers as leading dealmakers.

=== Diversity ===
On January 12, 2022, Vinson & Elkins became the founding sponsor of The University of Texas School of Law's new Pipeline Program. The firm made a $1 million commitment to support the program. In 2021, Vinson & Elkins was named as a leader in diversity equity and inclusion by Bloomberg as part of Bloomberg Law's DEI Framework study. In 2009, the firm was again named a Community of Respect by the Anti-Defamation League, a designation V&E has maintained since the program's inception in 2006, and is also the two-time recipient of the Thomas L. Sager Award for the South/Southwest Region by the Minority Corporate Counsel Association for the firm's sustained commitment to diversity.

=== Past Controversies ===
Vinson & Elkins was implicated in the Enron scandal as Enron's legal counsel. For the previous five years, Enron had been one of Vinson & Elkins' biggest clients and accounted for 8% of their total revenue in 2001. The firm had been made aware of potential accounting fraud in August 2001, but decided that Enron did not need a larger investigation into the issues. Vinson & Elkins was alleged to have approved and structured Enron's loss-hiding transactions as well as drafting and approving Enron's false SEC filings. Vinson & Elkins settled by paying $30 million to Enron's bankruptcy estate but admitted no wrongdoing.

== International ==
V&E has been active and has had an office in London for more than 50 years. The firm has represented clients throughout Asia for more than 30 years. V&E's office in Tokyo services local commercial hubs, as well as the broader Asia Pacific region. The practice also has a significant presence beyond office locations, with lawyers frequently advising on matters in Australia, India, Korea, and Southeast Asia. The Times has recognised the firm in its Best Law Firms 2026 list, an annual ranking of the top 250 law firms in England and Wales. The Legal 500 Latin America guide recognizes Vinson & Elkins in the Compliance and Investigations, Corporate and M&A, International Arbitration, Projects and Energy and City Focus – Houston categories, and recommended 19 individuals within the firm. https://www.legal500.com/latin-america/# Chambers UK 2024 Recommends Vinson & Elkins in Five Practice Areas, 11 Individual Lawyer Rankings

== Managing partners ==
- Keith Fullenweider (2021–present)
- Mark Kelly and Scott Wulfe (2012–2020)
- Joseph C. Dilg (2002–2011)
- Harry M. Reasoner (1992–2001)
- J. Evans Attwell (1981–91)
- A. Frank Smith Jr. (1971–81)
- Lewis White (1962–71)
- Raybourne Thompson Sr. (1959–62)
- Robert A. Shepherd Sr. (1952–59)
- Warren Dale (office manager 1947-52)
- James A. Elkins (1929–47)

== Notable employees ==
- Amanda K. Edwards, Houston City Council (2016–20), candidate for 2020 United States Senate election in Texas
- Griff Aldrich, head basketball coach, Longwood University
- J. Evans Attwell, former V&E managing partner; chair, Harris County Hospital District; and partial owner, Houston Astros (1978–1994)
- Howard H. Baker Jr., former U.S. senator; White House Chief of Staff (1987–88)
- Jimmy Blacklock, Chief Justice of the Texas Supreme Court
- Jane Bland, justice, Supreme Court of Texas (2019–present)
- Dale Carpenter, professor, Southern Methodist University Dedman School of Law
- John B. Connally Jr., presidential candidate (1980); Secretary of the Treasury (1971–72); Governor of Texas (1962–69); and Secretary of the Navy (1961–62)
- Thomas H. Cruikshank, chairman and chief executive officer, Halliburton (1983-1995)
- Carol E. Dinkins, deputy attorney general of Department of Justice (1984–85); assistant attorney general in charge of the Environment and Natural Resources Division for Department of Justice (1981–83)
- Kyle Duncan (judge), judge, United States Court of Appeals for the Fifth Circuit
- James A. Elkins, co-founder, Vinson & Elkins LLP; founder, First City Bank
- Sidney A. Fitzwater, judge, United States District Court for the Northern District of Texas
- Lizzie Fletcher, congresswoman from Houston (2019–present)
- Alberto Gonzales, U.S. Attorney General (2005–07); White House counsel (2001–05); Texas State Supreme Court (1999–2001); State Secretary of State Texas (1997–99); general counsel to Governor George W. Bush (1995–97)
- Theodore "Ted" W. Kassinger, Deputy Secretary, U.S. Department of Commerce (2004-); general counsel, U.S. Department of Commerce (2001–04)
- Ron Kirk, Mayor of Dallas, Texas (1995–2001); U.S. Trade Representative (2009-13)
- Reed O'Connor, chief judge, United States District Court for the Northern District of Texas
- George Peddy, attorney with Vinson & Elkins (1925-1942); Texas politician
- Claude Pollard, co-founder Vinson, Elkins, Wood and Pollard, Attorney General of Texas (1927–1929)
- Jeff Smisek, former chairman, president and CEO, Continental Airlines
- Barry T. Smitherman, chairman, Railroad Commission of Texas (2012-2014); chairman, Public Utility Commission of Texas (2007-2011); candidate for Texas Attorney General (2013-2014)
- Laura Swett, chairman, Federal Energy Regulatory Commission
- Eleanor Swift, professor, University of California, Berkeley School of Law
- G. Zachary Terwilliger, United States Attorney, Eastern District of Virginia (2018–2021)
- Mark Tuohey, candidate for Attorney General of the District of Columbia
- Michael F. Urbanski, chief judge, United States District Court for the Western District of Virginia (2017-2024)
- Ewing Werlein Jr., judge, United States District Court for the Southern District of Texas (1991-present)

== See also ==
- List of largest United States-based law firms by profits per partner
