= Wortham Center for the Performing Arts =

Coordinates: 35.59434°N 82.55112°W

The Wortham Center for the Performing Arts, formerly known as the Diana Wortham Theatre, is a 28,000 square foot (2,600 m^{2}) theater in Pack Place in Asheville, North Carolina. The main 500-seat Proscenium theater opened July 4, 1992 has about 50 shows each season between September and May, plus more than 100 events presented by groups that rent the space.

== Expansion ==
The $3 million expansion and renovation of the original 500–seat theater began in January 2019 to include Tina McGuire Theatre seating 80–100 people and Henry LaBrun Studio, which includes a dance studio and offices. The new venues allow performers to spend more time in Asheville and offer classes. The main theater now has seats from Radio City Music Hall which were reupholstered. The building used to also include The Health Adventure, Colburn Earth Science Museum, and Asheville Art Museum. After The Health Adventure became part of the Asheville Museum of Science on Patton Avenue, Asheville Art Museum expanded into its former space.

Diana Wortham is the daughter of Gus Sessions Wortham and Lyndall Finley Wortham and was "one of the largest private benefactors … of Pack Place," according to theatre director John Ellis. She continues to donate to causes, including improvements to the theatre, but she does not make appearances.

The name of the theater changed to Wortham Center for the Performing Arts September 17, 2019, the day of a ribbon cutting.
