= R. E. Smith =

American businessman (1894–1973)

R. E. "Bob" Smith
- Born: Robert Everett Smith; August 28, 1894; Greenville, Texas, United States
- Died: November 29, 1973 (aged 79)
- Occupation(s): Independent Oil and Land Man, Entrepreneur, Businessman, Sportsman, Humanitarian

Robert Everett Smith (August 28, 1894 – November 29, 1973) was an American oilman, real estate developer and rancher based in Houston.

In 1957, Smith was included in Fortune magazine's list of the seventy-six richest Americans. He was listed by author Kenneth Lamott in 1969 as one of the "Great Big New Rich".

== Biography ==
Smith graduated from Humble High School in 1911. He was a semi-professional baseball player for almost ten years. He graduated from the Officers' Training Corps at Camp Pike, Arkansas during World War I, but did not see action. Before and after the war, he was an oilfield roughneck or warehouse worker for Humble Oil, Gulf Oil, and the Texas Company. He was a sales manager for Peden Iron and Steel and for the W. K. M. Company. In 1920 he became an entrepreneur as a drilling contractor and producer. With business partner Claude Hamill, Smith concentrated on Houston and began buying land near the William P. Hobby Airport in southeastern Harris County, which increased in value over time. In the 1940s he bought out Hamill's holdings. These included thirty-six oil wells in the East Texas oil field. He also briefly owned a newspaper in Pasadena. During World War II, he was a regional director of civil defence and later became chairman of the Houston Housing Authority. Smith was president of the Petroleum Club of Houston and founded the Houston's United Citizens Association in 1955. In the 1960s, Smith built the Galveston Yacht Basin and promoted the Jamaica Corporation, which developed Jamaica Beach, Tiki Island and other subdivisions in Galveston County. He promoted the Harris County Domed Stadium, or Astrodome, which was built on land he controlled. He was also involved in the purchase of the Houston Colt .45s major league baseball team in 1962. By 1964 Smith owned more than 11,000 acres in Harris County, where he raised cattle and horses. He also owned land in Fort Bend and Colorado counties. In 1935 Smith married Vivian Leatherberry and they had two daughters. He received the Mexican Order of the Aztec Eagle in 1951 and honorary doctorates from George Pepperdine College, Texas Wesleyan College and Southwestern University. He was a member or officer of many organisations, including the Museum of Fine Arts, Houston, the Houston World Trade Committee and the Houston Symphony Orchestra. He was a dedicated Methodist.
