= Herman Brown =

American businessman and philanthropist

- Born: October 10, 1892; Belton, Texas, US
- Died: November 15, 1962 (aged 70)
- Burial place: Glenwood Cemetery, Houston, Texas
- Occupation: businessman
- Known for: Brown & Root, founder Brown Foundation, co-founder
- Spouse: Margarett (née Root) Brown
- Children: 2 adopted children
- Relatives: George R. Brown (brother)

Herman Brown (November 10, 1892 – November 15, 1962) was an American businessman and philanthropist. He was co-founder of Brown & Root, a prominent construction and engineering firm. He played a central role in the development of the company, which became known for its work on major infrastructure projects, including dams, bridges, military installations, and offshore drilling platforms. Brown's business ventures extended beyond construction, with involvement in oil and gas exploration and ranching, as well as serving on the boards of several major organizations. Brown and his wife, Margarett, were well known for their philanthropy.

== Early life and education ==
Herman Brown was born to Riney Louis and Lucy Wilson (née King) Brown in Belton, Texas. His family's roots in Texas dated back to the early 1800s, with his maternal grandfather and maternal great-grandfather serving as county judges in Milam and Lee counties respectively.

After briefly attending the University of Texas in 1911, Brown began working for a construction contractor in Belton. In 1914, Brown received used construction equipment and 18 mules in lieu of back wages. Using these resources, he established a road construction business.

In 1917, Margarett Root, a teacher and the daughter of Dan Root, had Herman Brown's younger brother as one her students. Herman Brown was introduced to Margarett at dance, which started their romance. In September 1917, they eloped marrying in a small ceremony officiated by a justice of the peace in Travis County.

In 1919, Brown's brother-in-law, Dan Root, joined with him to form Brown & Root. Root was silent partner, providing financial backing, but not involved in the running of the company. Herman Brown's brother, George joined the company in 1922.

== Business endeavors ==
=== Brown & Root ===
==== Founding of Brown & Root ====
Brown & Root was established by Herman Brown and Dan Root in 1919. The company initially focused on construction projects such as roads and bridges, with particular emphasis on municipal and county government contracts. In 1922, Brown's younger brother, George Rufus Brown, joined the firm. Brown & Root expanded quickly, securing numerous construction projects throughout Texas.

==== Depression years ====
During the Great Depression, Brown and his company faced significant challenges. In 1929, Dan Root died, and the stock market crashed. As the economy worsened, state projects dwindled. To make ends meet, the Brown brothers worked hauling trash for the City of Houston.

The company's fortunes were completely turned around with two major projects—a road for Humble Oil and a dam near Austin. In 1934, Brown secured a contract with Humble Oil to build a wooden plank road in Roanoke, Louisiana, marking the company's first major expansion outside Texas and establishing a lasting relationship with Humble Oil for future projects. In 1936, the firm won the bid to build the Marshall Ford Dam on Colorado River near Austin. The five-year dam project was the largest of its kind in Texas and helped raise the company's profile. Together, these projects helped solidify Brown & Root's position as a prominent heavy construction and industrial firm, paving the way for long-term government contracts.

The Marshall Ford Dam project was funded, in part, by the U.S. government. Newly elected Congressman Lyndon Johnson supported funding of the dam, which was located in his congressional district. This established a relationship between Johnson and the Brown brothers, which set a foundation for subsequent government projects for Brown & Root, and was the beginning for support by the Browns for Johnson's political career.

==== Early expansion and growth ====
Brown & Root, having established a solid foundation in municipal construction, began to bid on federal contracts. One of the major early successes for the company was the construction of the Naval Air Station at Corpus Christi in 1940, which was worth $90 million (equivalent to $2.07 billion in 2025). This contract was one of the first large federal defense contracts awarded to Brown & Root during World War II. During this period, the company also began branching into new sectors, including shipbuilding and pipeline construction.

==== Brown Shipbuilding ====
In 1942, the Brown brothers founded Brown Shipbuilding on the Houston Ship Channel, as a subsidiary of Brown & Root. The company built 359 ships for the U.S. Navy, employing over 25,000 people during the war effort. Despite having no prior experience in shipbuilding, the company succeeded in fulfilling significant contracts for the Navy, contributing to the U.S. war effort and solidifying its position as a major contractor. The contract, which began at $27 million, eventually grew to $357 million.

Following World War II, Brown & Root expanded into new areas of business. In 1947, the company reached a significant milestone by constructing its first offshore oil platform, located off the coast of Morgan City, Louisiana.

==== Major projects and global presence ====
During the 1950s and 1960s, Brown & Root was involved in the construction of major U.S. air and naval bases, including facilities in Spain, France, and Guam. The company also built large-scale infrastructure projects such as roads, dams, bridges, petrochemical plants, and offshore drilling platforms. Brown & Root's international presence grew substantially during this period as the company took on more global construction contracts.

==== Manned Spacecraft Center ====
In 1961, Brown and Root won the contract to help plan and construct the Manned Spacecraft Center in Houston, a $200 million project (equivalent to $2.155 billion in 2025) that played a critical role in the United States' space exploration efforts. This marked a significant milestone for the company, which continued to be involved in large-scale government contracts through the 1960s.

==== After Herman Brown's death: Halliburton and KBR ====
In the early 1960s, as Brown's health declined, the company's future was uncertain. Oilfield services company Halliburton approached Brown & Root with an acquisition offer. Shortly after Brown's death in 1962, Brown & Root was sold to Halliburton, for a sale price reported to be $36.8 million. Brown & Root continued to operate under its own name, with George R. Brown serving as chairman of the board.

After Halliburton acquired Dresser Industries in 1998, M. W. Kellogg, a subsidiary of Dresser, was combined with Brown & Root to form a larger subsidiary, KBR (Kellogg-Brown-Root). In 2006, KBR was spun off from Halliburton. By July 2015, the legacy Brown & Root company was spun off into an independent corporation, Brown & Root Industrial Services, headquartered in Baton Rouge, Louisiana.

=== Texas Eastern Transmission ===
During World War II, U.S. government funded the building of Big Inch petroleum pipelines, which reached from Texas to New Jersey. The pipelines were built between 1942 and 1944 as emergency war measures in the United States, to create an interior route for transporting oil, versus the vulnerable shipment of oil by sea. At the end of the war, the pipelines were put up for sale. In 1947, Herman and George Brown, along with partners, formed the Texas East Transmission Corporation and purchased both pipelines for $143 million, converting them to transport natural gas.

=== Corporate boards ===
Brown served on the boards of several institutions, including First City National Bank of Houston, Texas Eastern Transmission Company, Southwestern University, Armco Steel Corporation, and Texas Children's Hospital.

=== Other interests ===
Brown also participated in oil and gas exploration and owned ranching operations.

== Philanthropy, service, honors ==
Beyond his business career, Brown was involved in various philanthropic activities.

=== Brown Foundation ===
Brown was also a co-founder of the Brown Foundation, which supports educational and charitable initiatives in Texas. The Brown Foundation was established in 1951 by Herman Brown and his wife Margarett, and brother George R. Brown and his wife Alice. Their initial, substantial donations were to Rice University, Southwestern University, and the Museum of Fine Arts, Houston

The foundation has played a significant role in supporting charitable causes, particularly in the areas of education, arts, and medical efforts. — with approximately 35% going to education, 32% to arts and culture, and 12% to medicine and science. The foundation was initially supported by the collective wealth of the Brown family, Herman Brown was its guiding force. His vision for the foundation was to ensure that wealth generated through the family's involvement in the construction and oil pipeline industries would benefit the public good, especially in Texas.

Wanting to ensure that the foundation's mission continued after their deaths, Herman and Margarett Brown donated additional personal funds in 1962; and then, following their deaths in 1963, their estate, along with most of the US$36 million from the sale of Brown & Root, was transferred to the foundation. This allowed the foundation to grant over $2 billion in funds across the state of Texas since its inception.

=== Service ===
Brown served on the Board of Trustees of Southwestern University, in Georgetown, Texas, which was his wife Margarett's alma mater. He was also on the Board of Directors of Texas Children's Hospital in Houston, Texas.

=== Namesakes ===
In honor of the contributions of Herman Brown, several university facilities bear his name. Notable examples include:

- Rice University: "Herman Brown Hall for Mathematical Sciences", built in 1968
- Rice University: "Brown College", women's residential college, built in 1965, named after Herman Brown's wife, Margarett Root Brown
- Southwestern University: "Herman Brown Hall", co-ed residence hall
- Southwestern University: "Herman Brown Professorship", an endowed chair in English
- Texas Medical Center: "Fondren-Brown Cardiovascular and Orthopedic Research Center", consisting of the "Ella F. Fondren Building" and the "Herman Brown Building"
- City of Houston: "Herman Brown Park", a 901-acre park, located along Hunting Bayou Greenway
- "Brown Building" in Austin, Texas, an "icon" landmark built by Herman Brown, listed on the National Register of Historic Places

== Personal life, death, and legacy ==
In 1917, Herman Brown married Margarett Root. They did not have any biological children of their own. In the 1940s, the couple adopted Louisa Stude and her brother Micajah Stude.

Herman Brown died on November 15, 1962. At his funeral, the eulogy was given by, then vice president Lyndon Johnson. He was buried in Glenwood Cemetery in Houston. His wife, Margarett, died in January 1963, and she was buried beside him.

== See also ==
- George R. Brown
- Museum of Fine Arts, Houston
