= George R. Brown =

American businessman (1898–1983)

George Rufus Brown (May 12, 1898 – January 22, 1983) was a prominent Houston entrepreneur. With his brother Herman Brown, he led Brown & Root Inc. to become one of the largest construction companies in the world and helped to foster the political career of Lyndon B. Johnson. The George R. Brown Convention Center and the George R. Brown School of Engineering of Rice University are both named in honor of him.

== Early life ==
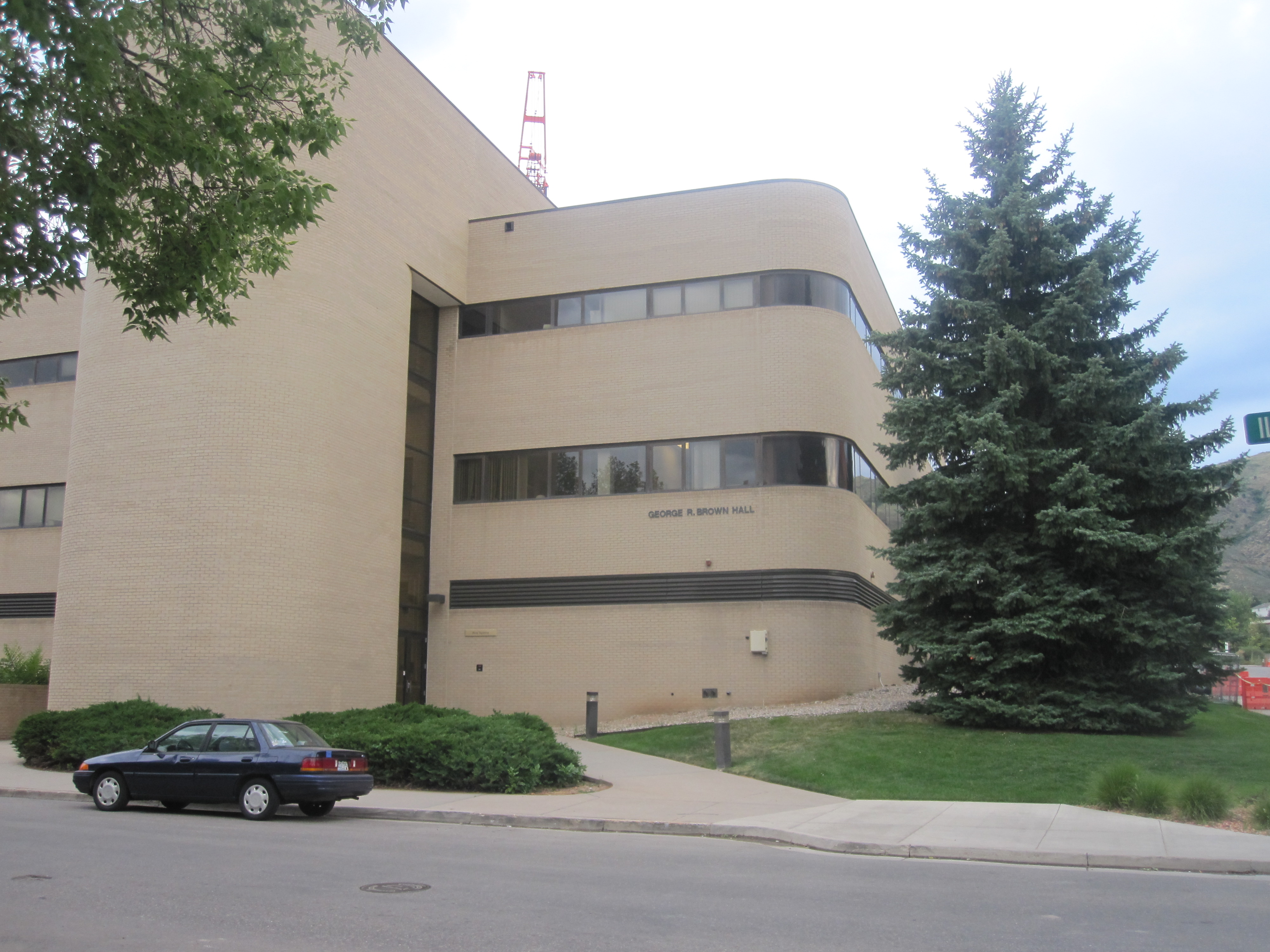
The George R. Brown Hall at Colorado School of Mines in Golden, Colorado

Brown was born on May 12, 1898, in Belton and moved in 1904 to Temple; both communities are in Bell County. His older brother, Herman, left Rice University after spending less than a year there and started work in road paving. Herman's brother-in-law, Dan Root, loaned Herman money in 1919 and founded Brown & Root in 1919. George R. Brown studied at Rice University and the University of Texas at Austin before he graduated from the Colorado School of Mines in 1922 and joined his brother in the business. The company paved roads and built bridges and other public works in Houston.

== Brown & Root, Inc. ==
=== 1936–1947 ===
In 1936, Brown & Root was awarded a contract to construct the Marshall Ford Dam (now known as the Mansfield Dam). The construction was almost stopped in 1937 but was allowed to continue when Lyndon B. Johnson (then a very junior congressman) helped push through favorable legislation. The project was part of the New Deal and was completed in 1942. During World War II, the company's work was expanded to military construction. Over 300 watercraft were constructed. The company was investigated by the U.S. Internal Revenue Service in 1942 for giving bonuses to employees who had agreed to donate to Lyndon B. Johnson. Brown & Root was ultimately fined $372,000.

=== 1947–1969 ===
In 1947, Brown created an innovative oil platform design that was the first to be built out of sight of land. For this work, Brown was awarded the Gold Medal for Distinguished Achievement from the American Petroleum Institute in 1982. Other notable projects the company was involved with were Rice Stadium, the Lyndon B. Johnson Space Center, the Pontchartrain Bridge, and the Gulf Freeway from Houston to Galveston. After Herman Brown's death in 1962, Brown & Root was merged with Halliburton.

=== NASA and Johnson Space Center ===
Using the power and influence gained from his success at Brown & Root, Brown became a chairman on the Rice University Council of Regents. During his time there, Brown worked in conjunction with Texas Congressman Albert Thomas to bring Johnson Space Center (JSC) to Houston. To do this Brown secured a gift of 1,020 acres of land from Humble Oil to Rice University and proceeded to donate it to NASA on Rice’s behalf. NASA accepted the donation after inspecting the area and began construction of the JSC in 1961.

== Legacy ==
In 1951, Brown, along with his brother Herman and their wives, began the Brown Foundation. The organization donates to notable institutions such as Rice University, Southwestern University, and the Museum of Fine Arts, Houston. As of 2018, the Brown Foundation had given away $1.6 billion.

He lived in the River Oaks area of Houston, in a house built for him. In 2017 the house was on the market for $10 million.

== See also ==
- Herman Brown
- George R. Brown Convention Center
- Rice University
