= Sweeney Clock =

Clock near Tranquillity Park, Houston, Texas

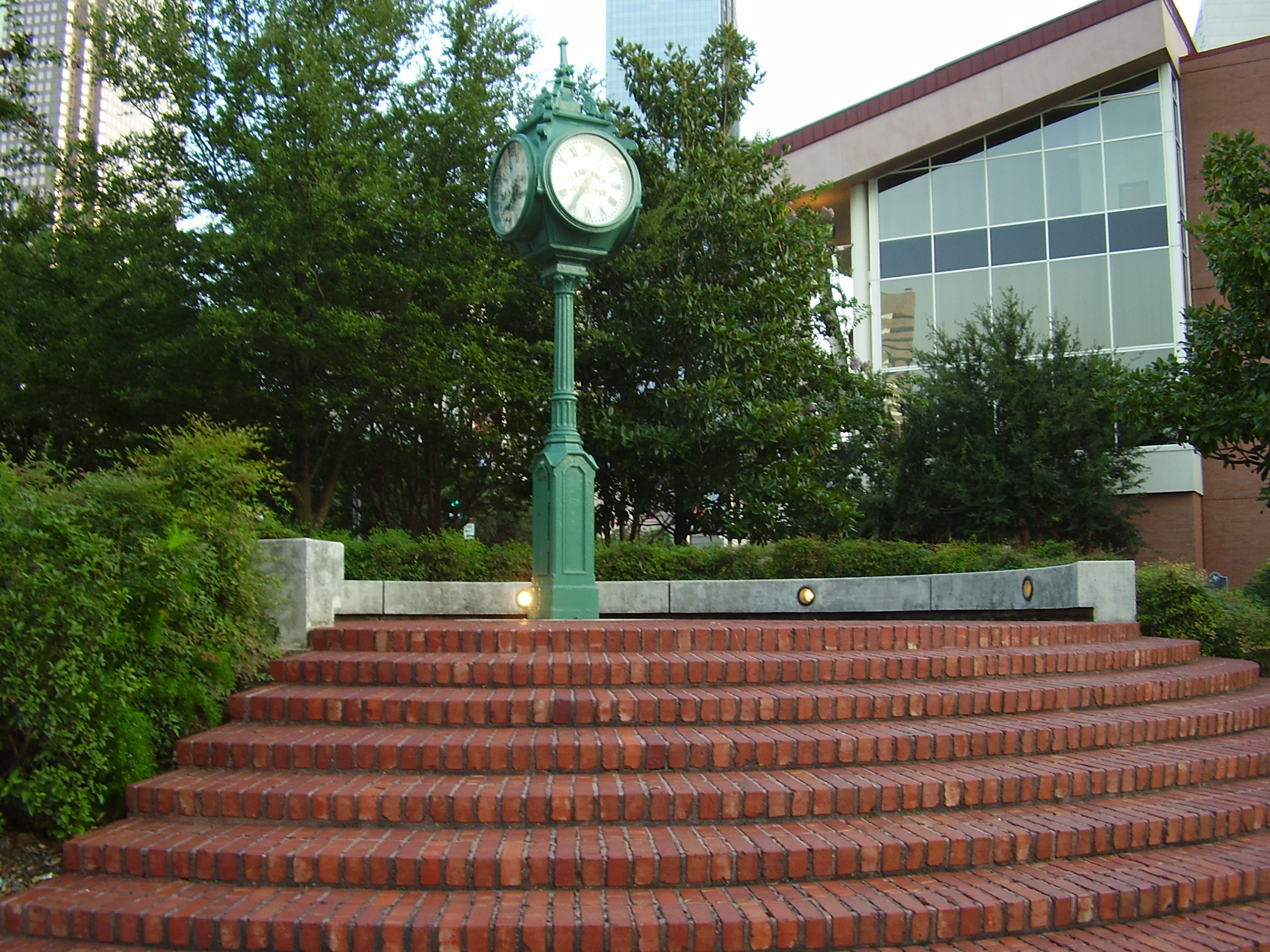
- The clock in 2009

- Location within Texas
- Coordinates: 29.762086°N 95.368774°W

The Sweeney Clock is a 1908 clock installed near Houston's Tranquillity Park, in the U.S. state of Texas. The clock was originally installed outside the J.J. Sweeney & Co. jewellery store at the northeast corner of the intersection of Main Street and Prairie Street from 1908 to 1928. The clock was originally purchased from Boston clockmaker E. Howard & Co. and was also used as a hitching post for horse-drawn carriages.

Donated by the store to the City of Houston in 1929, the clock was moved to the downtown Farmer's Market and later to the courtyard of a municipal building near the Jefferson Davis Hospital. By 1968, the clock had deteriorated badly. It was restored and moved to its present location, the Sweeney Triangle, at the intersection of Bagby Street with Rusk Street and Capitol Street, in 1971, with funds provided by the Colonial Dames of America. A base for the 15-foot timepiece was made using paving bricks from historic Navigation Street. Today the Sweeney Clock is maintained and preserved by the City of Houston Civic Center Department.
