= Club Quarters Hotel (Houston) =

Hotel in Houston, Texas, U.S.

Club Quarters Hotel Downtown Houston
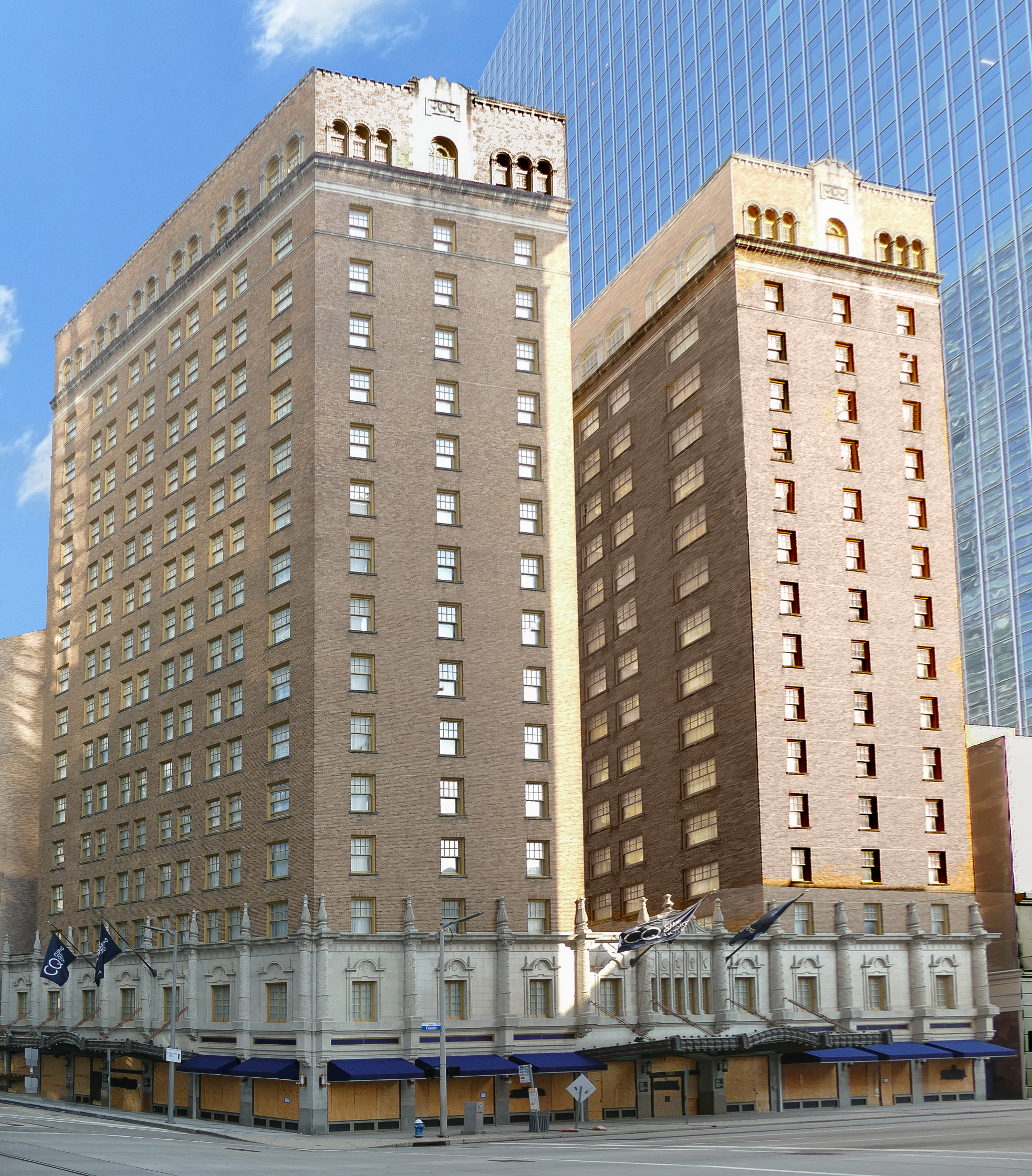

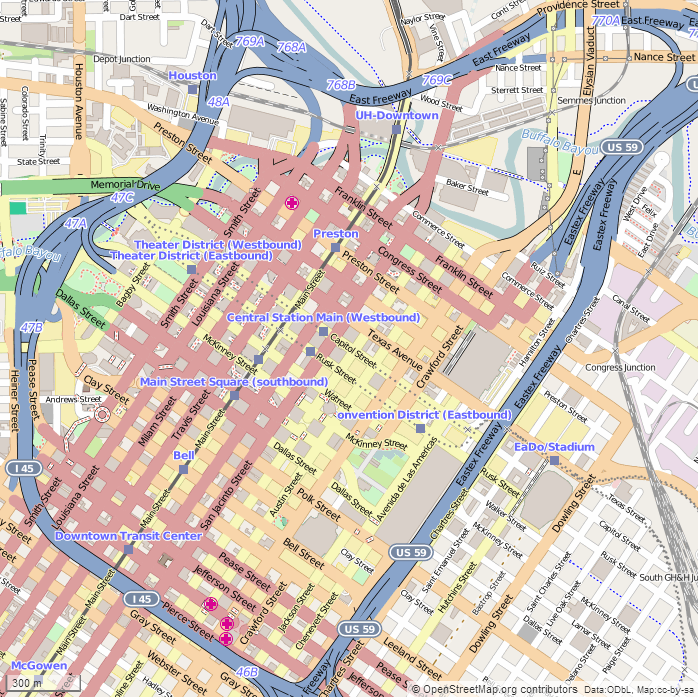
- Location within Houston Downtown Location within Texas Location within the United States

General information
- Location: 1085 Rusk Street; Houston, Texas
- Coordinates: 29.7578°N 95.3628°W

Height
- Height: 61.6 m (202 ft)

Technical details
- Floor count: 16
- Lifts/elevators: 4

Design and construction
- Architect: Joseph Finger

Other information
- Number of restaurants: 1

Website
- www.clubquarters.com
- Texas State Hotel
- U.S. National Register of Historic Places
- NRHP reference No.: 07001384

Significant dates
- Added to NRHP: January 10, 2008
- Designated {{{NRHP_TYPE}}}: 1

The Club Quarters Hotel Downtown Houston is a 16-story, 61.6 m (202 ft) Beaux-Arts high-rise at 1085 Rusk Street in downtown Houston, Texas, United States. The building is listed on the National Register of Historic Places as the Texas State Hotel.

== History ==
=== Site ===
The Texas State Hotel is located at 720 Fannin, at the corner of Fannin and Rusk in downtown Houston. As recently as 2007, it shared Block 80 with the Kress Building (1913), the Houston Bar Center, and the Kirby Building. This last two buildings have been modified with modern slipcovers. The 2008 NRHP nomination form reported eleven buildings within a block of the Texas State Hotel which predated World War II. The predominant land use of Block 80 was originally residential. The First Baptist Church once occupied the Texas State Hotel site, a neighborhood church which was built in 1883 and occupied through 1905. One commercial building was located on Block 80 in the late-nineteenth century, with two large houses situated on large lots with outbuildings. One of these houses had an address on Rusk Street, the other on Capitol street. They persisted through 1924, even as Main Street hosted extensive commercial development. Block 80 consisted completely of commercial development after 1924. The First Baptist Church site lay vacant for two decades until the construction of the Texas State Hotel.

=== Building ===
The Texas State Hotel was designed by Joseph Finger, a local architect. The footprint of the sixteen-story, steel-framed building was a C-shape facing both Fannin and Rusk streets. The hotel was owned by Jesse H. Jones.

The Texas State Hotel was originally planned for the 1928 Democratic National Convention, but due to construction and finance difficulties, was not completed until 1929 (with the help of Jesse Holman Jones).

At one point in the 1980s, The University of Texas owned the property and a hotel-management group ran the hotel, but it proved unprofitable and closed.

The Hotel eventually went up for auction in 1987, at which a subsidiary of Texaco made the winning bid of $1.39 million for the property, which was located across the street of their, at the time headquarters at 1111 Rusk. It was left unused until Fannin & Rusk, LP took over the property for redevelopment.

The renovation of the Texas State Hotel won the 2006 Good Brick Awards, given by the Greater Houston Preservation Alliance to honor exceptional preservation projects and the people behind them. Since it has opened, it has featured a restaurant, Table 7 Bistro, on the bottom floor.

== Residences ==
The building includes serviced apartments, operated under the name Rusk House, which have the same amenities as the regular guests
