= 1940 Air Terminal Museum =

Building in Houston (vicinity), Harris County, Texas

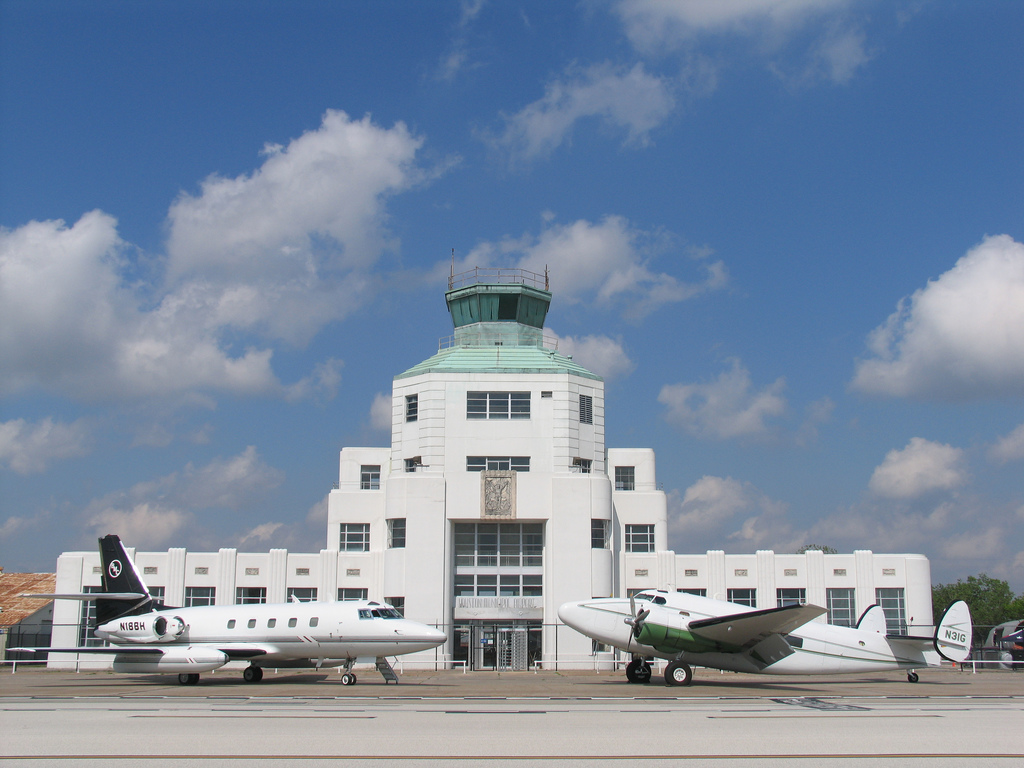
- The 1940 Air Terminal Museum
- Established: 1940
- Location: Houston, Texas, United States, at William P. Hobby Airport
- Houston Municipal Airport Terminal
- U.S. National Register of Historic Places
- Architect: Joseph Finger
- NRHP reference No.: 100003488
- Added to NRHP: March 6, 2019
- Coordinates: 29°38′49″N 95°17′10″W

The 1940 Air Terminal Museum was a museum located in Houston, Texas, United States, at William P. Hobby Airport. Collections were housed in the original art deco building which served as the first purpose-built terminal for passenger flight in Houston. The museum exhibited several collections focusing on Houston's civil aviation history and was operated by the Houston Aeronautical Heritage Society (HAHS), a recognized Texas 501(c)(3) tax-exempt organization.

== History ==
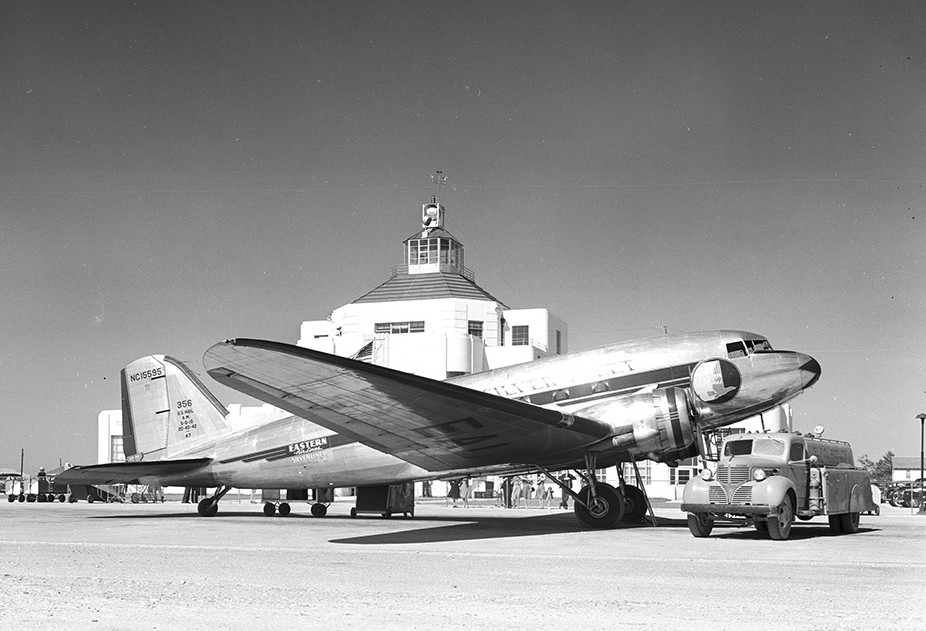
Eastern Air Lines DC-3 at the then-new Houston Municipal Airport Terminal, April 1941

The museum was housed in the Houston Municipal Airport Terminal building, a streamline moderne airport terminal built with Public Works Administration (PWA) funds in 1940. The terminal building is among the few surviving examples of classic art deco airport architecture from the 1940s. The terminal served Houston during the years when air travelers dressed in their best and embarked for destinations aboard roaring prop liners like the Douglas DC-3 and the Lockheed Constellation. Designed by architect Joseph Finger (who also designed Houston's City Hall), the terminal was designed to meet Houston's growing role as a center for air commerce in the late 1930s. The terminal served as the only commercial air terminal for Houston until 1954, and was subsequently used by various tenants until 1978. In that year, Hobby Airport's manager James Delong proposed demolishing the 1940 terminal to free up ramp space, but enthusiasts blocked the demolition. The terminal was then unoccupied for nearly 20 years.

In 1988 Stephen Fox of Cite said that the terminal was "in very shabby condition."

=== Restoration and modern use ===
The city of Houston stabilized the exterior of the building, and members of the Houston Aviation Alliance worked to save the terminal. In 1998, the Houston Aeronautical Heritage Society (HAHS), a nonprofit organization, was formed primarily to save the threatened terminal building. HAHS recognized that funding and renovation must be completed in phases, and created a plan to restore the building over time. In late 2003, HAHS's contractors completed the asbestos and lead abatement of the north wing of the terminal. The abatement process stripped the original plaster from the interior walls, leaving the non-loadbearing tile curtain walls of the terminal intact.

The North Wing of the Air Terminal was opened to the public in February 2004 as the first phase of the museum. The restored North Wing of the terminal housed the museum's collection and gift shop and served as the museum's base of operations while completing fund raising and restoration of the remainder of the building.

The rest of the building completed asbestos abatement in May 2008 and completed atrium and mezzanine reconstruction in February 2009. The full lower floor will be restored to its original condition when funds permit. The museum will spread out and occupy the entire first floor of the terminal building and then begin renovation of the upper floors.

The American Institute of Aeronautics & Astronautics (AIAA) designated the 1940 Air Terminal Museum a Historic Aerospace Site. The 1940 Air Terminal is the AIAA's 35th aerospace site recognized as a rare example of classic Art Deco airport architecture. In February 2010, the Houston Aeronautical Heritage Society was presented with a Good Brick Award for excellence in preservation for the 1940 Air Terminal Museum. Good Brick Awards are given annually from the Greater Houston Preservation Alliance. In 2008 the Houston Press declared the terminal the "Best Piece of Aviation History".

In 2008, HAHS was granted a license to the oldest hangar on Hobby Airport's grounds, a 1929 Great Silver Fleet Maintenance Hangar. The organization used this hangar to display larger exhibits from the collection, such as three simulators, and HAHS's aircraft collection, which includes a 1942 Lockheed Lodestar executive businessliner, and an S-58 Sikorsky Helicopter that was outfitted for civilian heavy lifting.

The museum abruptly announced its closure on March 2, 2026 as a result of financial difficulties. It subsequently began deaccessioning artifacts. However, on July 1st, the day after the museum's lease on the building expired, the Texas Historical Commission signed a six-month lease on the building to allow time for it to be evaluated for potential inclusion as a state historical site.

== Events ==
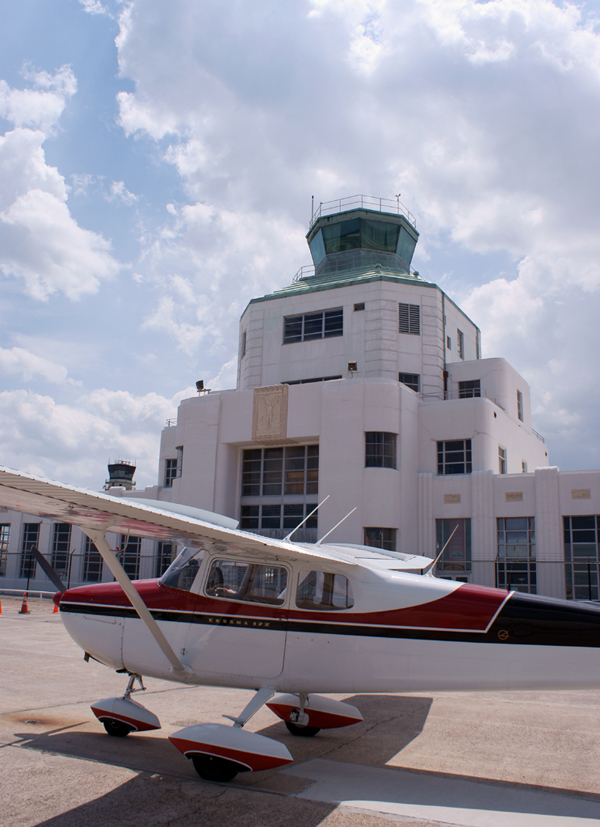
The 2008-2009 Win-A-Plane raffle winner received this aircraft when his or her ticket was drawn in July 2009.

The 1940 Air Terminal Museum receives funding through grants from many private and public foundations, as well as individual donors. The museum also operates a Members' Program, which allows special access to some functions for members. The museum and its buildings are also available for private functions.

HAHS currently benefits from several fundraisers:

- Wings and Wheels – every third Saturday of the month, the 1940 Air Terminal Museum has static displays of aircraft and cars.
- Pops & Props Gala – an annual fundraising dinner and dance.
- Win-A-Plane Raffle – an annual raffle for a beautifully restored vintage plane.
- Hobby Fest – the large, annual Wings and Wheels with several special guests, rides, and prizes.

== See also ==
- List of museums in the Texas Gulf Coast
