= Slipcover (disambiguation) =

A slipcover is a protective cover that fits over upholstered furniture.

Slipcover may also refer to:

- Slipcover (architecture), a modification of an older building facing by adding a new ornamental layer
- Slipcase, a box into which books, videos, or audio media are stored
