= Battelstein's =

- U.S. National Register of Historic Places
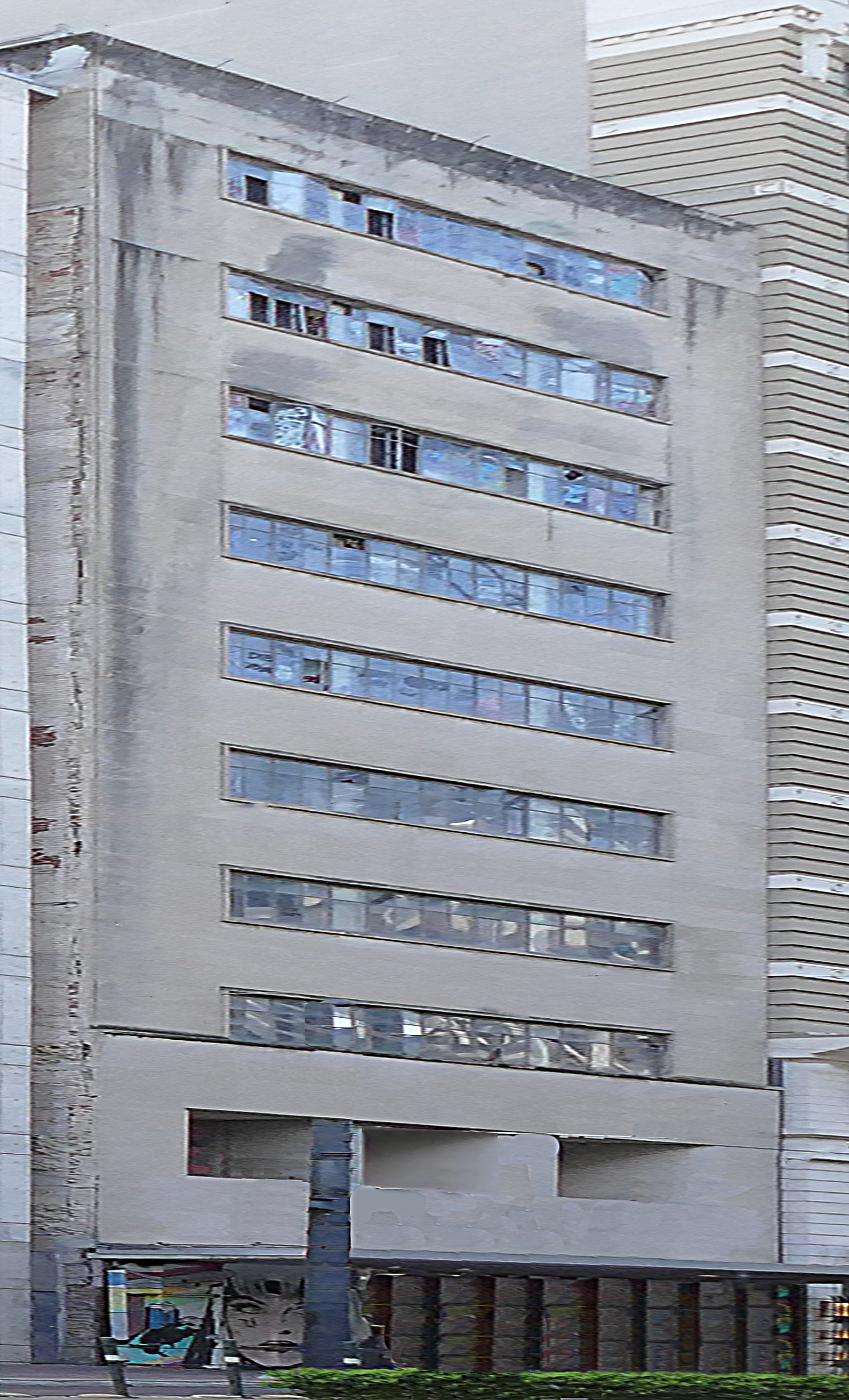
- Battelstein's in 2021

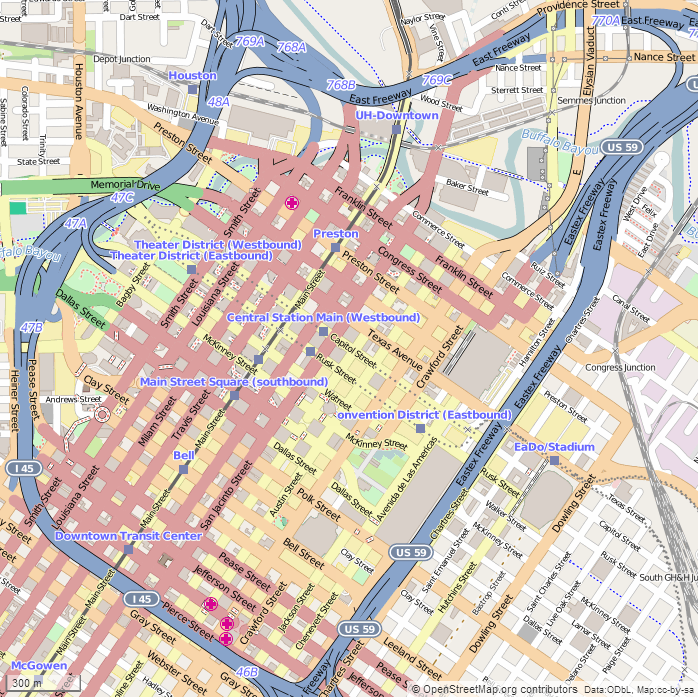
- Location within Houston Downtown Location within Texas Location within the United States
- Location: 812 Main Street; Houston, Texas
- Coordinates: 29.7583111°N 95.3644078°W
- Built: 1950; 76 years ago
- Architect: Joseph Finger; George Rustay
- Architectural style: Modern
- NRHP reference No.: 100004966
- Added to NRHP: February 6, 2020

Battelstein's is a commercial skyscraper located on Main Street in downtown Houston, Texas, United States. From 1924 until 1980, it housed an eponymous department store founded by Philip Battelstein. Originally only two floors, it was expanded to its present ten-story form between 1934 and 1950 by architects Joseph Finger and George Rustay. It was added to the National Register of Historic Places on February 6, 2020.

== History ==
=== P. Battelstein & Company ===
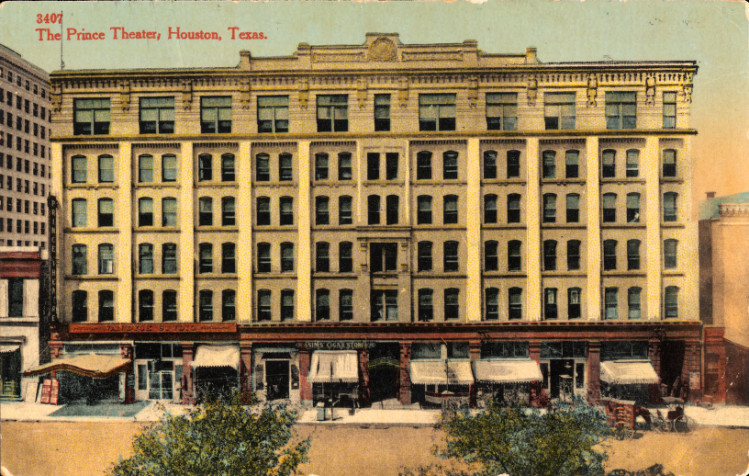
The Prince Theater, where Battelstein opened his first store

Philip Battelstein arrived in Houston in 1897 as a Jewish immigrant from Lithuania. Arriving with only a few dollars to his name, he soon opened his own tailor and haberdashery, P. Battelstein & Company, located inside the Prince Theater building at 314 Fannin Street (now a walkway adjacent to the Harris County Tax Office); it later burned down.

Battelstein restarted his business at 618 Main Street in 1909; around the same time, the partnership dissolved and the company name became just "P. Battelstein". This business also burned down in 1924 after a fire broke out at the adjacent Old Capitol Hotel.

=== Battelstein's building ===
Battelstein then purchased the present-day site at 812 Main Street. This new iteration of Battelstein's was a simple two-story building, completed in early 1924; however, the architect Battelstein hired to plan the works is unknown, but at least the interior fixtures were the work of Houston Showcase & Manufacturing Co.

Originally, Battelstein shared the building with several other tenants, but quickly began to expand. By June 1924, Battelstein's announced it would double in size and touted itself as "being made the most modern in the Southwest". By 1933, his business had expanded enough to take up the entirety of the first floor. The following year, Battelstein hired Houston architect Joseph Finger to design an expansion. The store expanded again in 1937, this time adding three floors and multiple new departments.

Battelstein's prospered during the post-World War II years. The department store business in Houston flourished, and several expanded their buildings and services during this time; they were some of the first companie to start building skyscrapers in downtown Houston. By the late 1940s, Battelstein's was ready to increase in size again and planned a major remodel along with it. Finger was rehired and Tellepsen Construction Company was chosen to construct it. The expansion was completed in 1950 and was followed by several minor restorations and redecorations over the decades, as well as the opening of two new stores: at River Oaks in 1953 and at Sharpstown Mall in 1961. Although Battelstein himself died in 1955, his store's success did not slow. From 1952 to 1956, Battelstein's was announced to have advertised so much that it led the nation in newspaper linage for its menswear ads.

=== New management and decline ===
In 1967, Battelstein's was purchased by Manhattan Industries, a New York-based clothing manufacturer, for $8 million. In 1969, two new outlet stores at Northwest Mall and Almeda Mall opened. By this time, Battelstein's employed over 1,100 people and was one of the largest department store chains in Houston. Another location later opened at Greenspoint Mall.

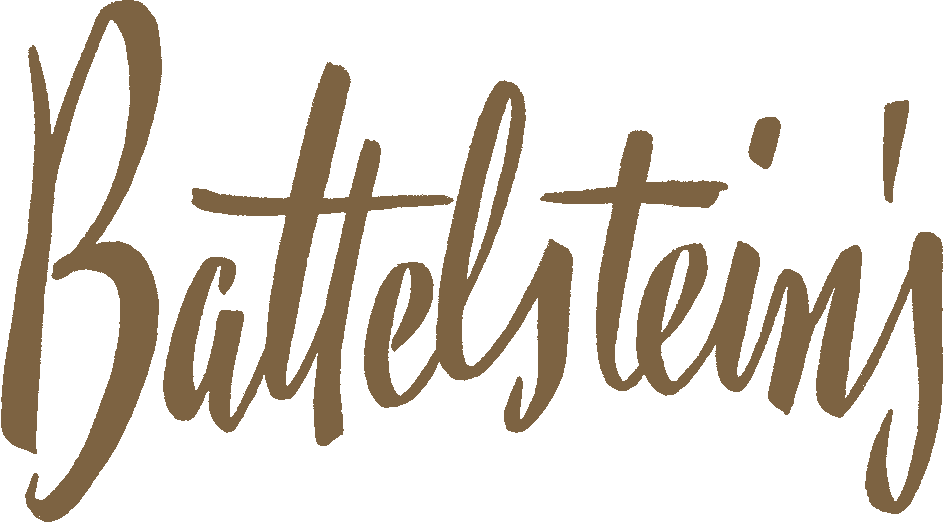
Battelstein's logo

Soon, however, Battelstein's began its decline. Throughout the 1970s, crime in downtown Houston increased significantly. The downtown location had long been outsold at its sister stores, as well as other department store outlets, especially those located in suburbia. It also did not have the parking capacity to support immense numbers of shoppers, which the while the suburban malls could build sprawling parking lots. Battelstein's was sold again in 1980 to Bealls, who closed the downtown location in 1981. It then entered a period of on-and-off vacancy at different tenants occupied the building and operated as a nightclub and then as condominium apartments. The building then sat vacant for over a decade before it was purchased by the neighboring Marriott Hotel in 2019.

== Architecture ==
Overall, the building covers a total floor area of 63,960 square feet (5,942 m^{2}) over ten stories, and its footprint measures about 52 by 128 feet (16 m × 39 m). The first two floors are original to the 1924 construcution and were designed by an unknown architect, but the top eight floors date from the 1930s to 1950; these were conceived of by architects Joseph Finger and George Rustay, who chose a Modern design with International elements. The facade is made of limestone on its eastern (street-facing side) and brick on the others. Its roof is flat with a flared edge. There is an inset balcony with three bays on the second floor, which overlooks the street below. The ribbon windows on the upper eight levels are all identical and are set in the center of the facade.
