= Simon and Mamie Minchen House =

- U.S. National Register of Historic Places
- Recorded Texas Historic Landmark
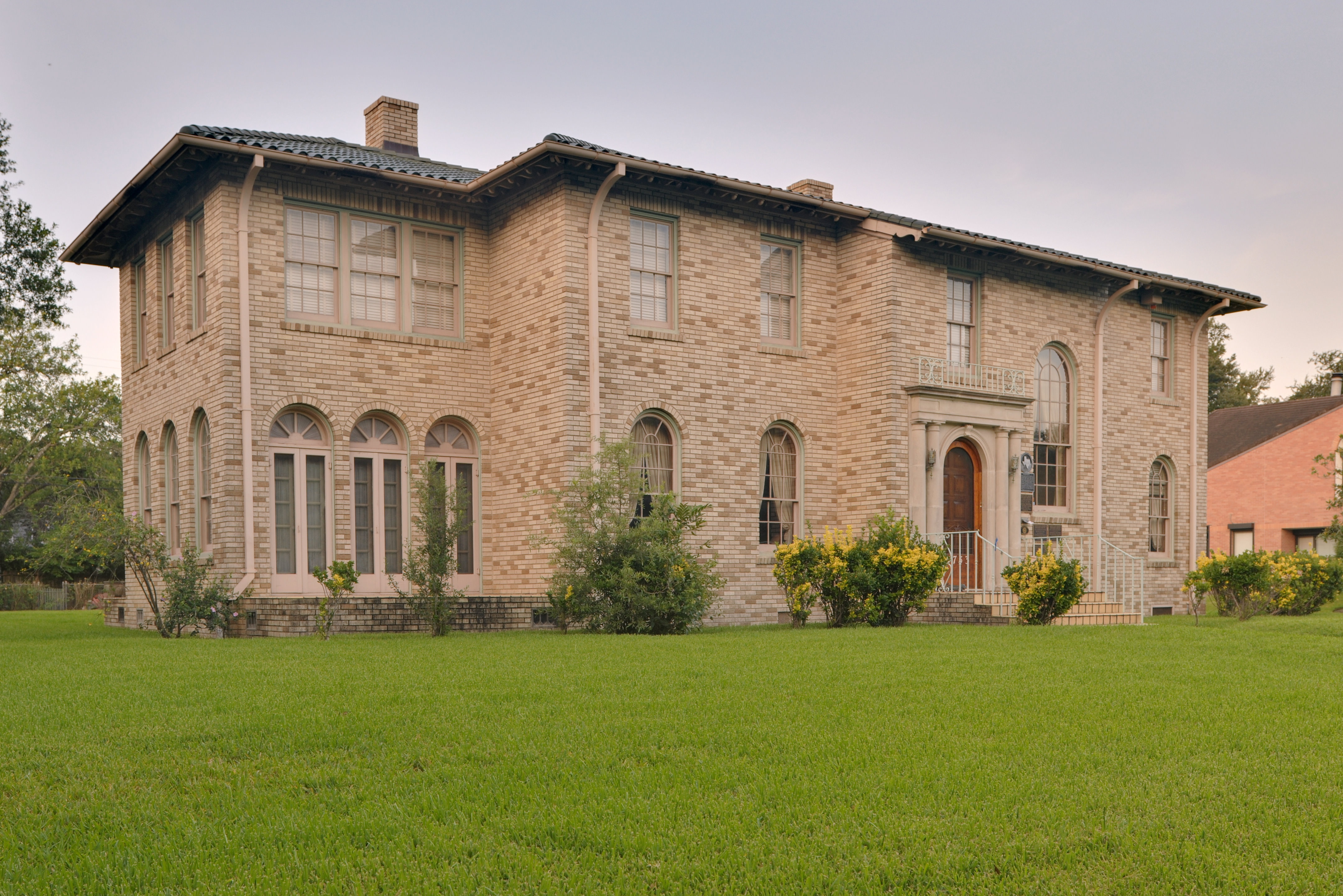
- Minchen House in 2010

- Location within Texas Location within the United States
- Location: 1753 North Blvd., Houston, Texas
- Coordinates: 29°43′45″N 95°24′15″W
- Area: 0.4 acres (0.16 ha)
- Built: 1931
- Built by: W.K. Goggan
- Architect: Joseph Finger
- Architectural style: Italian Renaissance
- NRHP reference No.: 00001496
- RTHL No.: 12609

Significant dates
- Added to NRHP: December 7, 2000
- Designated RTHL: 1999

The Simon and Mamie Minchen House is a single-family residence in the Ormond Place subdivision in Boulevard Oaks, Houston. It is listed on the National Register of Historic Places, #00001496, as of December 7, 2000. It is also a Recorded Texas Historic Landmark and a Protected Houston Landmark. The two-story house uses an Italian Renaissance architectural style, and it also has a garage of the same height, which can hold three cars. The property also has a residence formerly used for servants.

Joseph Finger designed the house, built in 1931, and it had been held in the Minchen family for generations. It was put up for sale for $2.2 million in 2018.

== See also ==
- National Register of Historic Places listings in inner Harris County, Texas
- Recorded Texas Historic Landmarks in Harris County
