= Joseph Finger =

American architect

Joseph Finger

Joseph Finger (7 March 1887 – 6 February 1953) was an Austrian American architect. After immigrating to the United States in 1905, Finger settled in Houston, Texas in 1908, where he would remain for the duration of his life. Finger is best remembered for his role in bringing modern architecture to Texas.

== Early years ==
Joseph Finger was born 7 March 1887 in Bielitz, Austria-Hungary to Henri Finger (1862-1941) and Hani Seifter (1870-1947). After finishing high school and technical training, he moved to the United States in 1905.

== Career ==
Finger settled first in New Orleans in 1905, then moved to Houston, Texas in three years later. He found employment with C. D. Hill & Company, an architecture firm based in Dallas, where he worked for about five years.

Finger joined a series of architecture partnerships, starting with Green & Finger in 1913. At that firm, he designed the DeGeorge Hotel, located at the corner of Preston and Labranch. His second partnership was with Lamar Q. Cato (Finger & Cato). After 1922, he worked independently. By the late 1920s, he established a robust business for hotel design, completing three hotels outside Houston, and the Auditorium Hotel, the Ben Milam Hotel, the Plaza Hotel, and the Texas State Hotel, all in Houston. Many of these hotels catered to wealthy residents with modern amenities such as air conditioning and running ide-water. All of these Houston hotels were still standing through the first part of 2012, when the Auditorium and Texas State still operated as hotels, the DeGeorge was used as a hotel for veterans, and the Plaza as a bank. By the end of 2012, however, the Ben Milam was taken down.

While conservative style marked Finger's luxury hotels, some of his other buildings reflected Art Deco style. In 1925, he designed the Temple Beth Israel, more recently repurposed as a theater building for Houston Community College. His 1929 building, the Houston Turn-Verein Clubhouse, employed some Austrian-inspired "zig-zag" Art Deco elements. Meanwhile he was the architect of over two dozen Art Deco grocery stores for the Weingarten chain.

Though Finger established a practice of commercial architecture, he also designed many single-family residences, especially in the Riverside Terrace neighborhood in Houston. One of these was for Abe Weingarten. Jesse H. Jones contracted for his services for a mixed-use building to house the Houston Chamber of Commerce with a store front for Levy Brothers' Dry Goods, a collaboration with Alfred C. Finn. This design team later produced Jefferson Davis Hospital, which occupied a site more recently occupied by the Federal Reserve Building.

From 1944 until his death in 1953, Finger worked in a partnership with George W. Rustay.

Finger designed the 1939 Houston City Hall, designed in a stripped classical style. In response to criticism from Houston mayor R. H. Fonville, who wanted a style with more classical reference, Finger said, "Here in America we are rapidly developing our own type of architecture which is far above that of foreign countries. We are building for the masses, not the classes." Above the lobby entrance of the City Hall is a stone relief of two men taming a wild horse, symbolizing a community coming together to form a government to tame the world around them. This sculpture, and the twenty-seven other friezes around the building, were carved by Beaumont artist Herring Coe and co-designer Raoul Josset.

== Personal life ==
On June 18, 1913, Finger married Gertrude Levy (1891-1985), a Houston native. The couple had one son, Joseph Seifter Finger (1918-2003), who also practiced architecture.

In Houston, Finger was a member of the Benevolent and Protective Order of Elks, the Houston Chamber of Commerce, Houston Turn-Verein, B'nai B'rith, and the Westwood Country Club.

== Death and legacy ==
On 6 February 1953, a month short of his 66th birthday, Finger died in Houston. He is buried in Beth Israel Mausoleum in Beth Israel Cemetery.

== Works ==
Name	City	Address	Year	Status	Architects
Panama Hotel	Galveston, Texas	202 Rosenberg Street	1912		Green and Finger
American National Insurance Company	Galveston, Texas		1913	Demolished	
Model Laundry	Galveston, Texas	513 25th Street	1913		Green and Finger
De George Hotel	Houston, Texas	1418 Preston Street	1913		
Concordia Club	Houston, Texas		1915	Demolished	
Sterne Building	Houston, Texas	300 Main Street	1916		
Cheek-Neal Coffee Company	Houston, Texas	2017 Preston Street	1917		
Keystone Building	Houston, Texas	1120 Texas Avenue	1922		
Tennison Hotel	Houston, Texas	110 Bagby Street	1922		
Ricou-Brewster Building	Shreveport, Louisiana	421 Milam Street	1924	Demolished	with Seymour Van Os
Temple Beth Israel	Houston, Texas	3517 Austin Street	1924	Now Heinen Theatre	
Texas Packing Company	Houston, Texas		1924		
William Penn Hotel	Houston, Texas	1423 Texas Avenue	1925	Demolished 2006	
Citizens State Bank	Houston, Texas	3620 Washington Avenue	1925	Now Rockefeller Hall	
Auditorium Hotel	Houston, Texas	701 Texas Avenue	1926	Now Lancaster Hotel	
Wade Irvin House	La Porte, Texas	431 Bayridge Road	1927		
Vaughn Hotel	Port Arthur, Texas	600 Proctor Street	1929		
Charleston Hotel	Lake Charles, Louisiana	900 South Ryan Street	1929		
Joseph Finger House	Houston, Texas	2221 Rosedale Avenue	1929		
A. C. Burton Company Auto Showroom	Houston, Texas	1400 Main Street	1929	Demolished	
Texas State Hotel	Houston, Texas	720 Fannin Street	1929	Now Club Quarters Hotel	
Houston Turn-Verein Clubhouse	Houston, Texas	5202 Almeda Road	1929	Demolished 1993	
James West House	Houston, Texas	3303 East NASA Parkway	1929		
Plaza Hotel	Houston, Texas	5020 Montrose Boulevard	1929		
McCartney Hotel	Texarkana, Texas	100 Front Street	1930	Abandoned	
Wolff Memorial Home	Houston, Texas		1930	Demolished	
Simon and Mamie Minchen House	Houston, Texas	1753 North Boulevard	1931		
Thomas Monroe House	Houston, Texas	1624 Kirby Drive	1931		
Davis House	Houston, Texas	2330 North Braeswood Boulevard	1933		
Barker Brothers Studio	Houston, Texas	4912 Main Street	1931		
Henry Tennison House	Houston, Texas	427 Lovett Boulevard	1932	Now owned by Alliance Française	
Byrd's Department Store	Houston, Texas	420 Main Street	1934		
Beth Israel Mausoleum	Houston, Texas	1207 West Dallas Street	1935		
Montgomery County Courthouse	Conroe, Texas	301 North Main Street	1935		
Jefferson Davis Hospital	Houston, Texas	1801 Allen Parkway	1936	Demolished 1999	with Alfred C. Finn
Ben Milam Hotel	Houston, Texas	1521 Texas Avenue	1936	Demolished 2012	
Clarke and Courts Printing Plant	Houston, Texas	1210 West Clay Street	1936	Now Tribeca Lofts	
John Platt House	Houston, Texas	3311 Del Monte Drive	1936		
Joseph Weingarten House	Houston, Texas	4000 South MacGregor Way	1937	Currently undergoing full restoration	
Tower Community Centre	Houston, Texas	1003 Westheimer Road	1937		
Abe Weingarten House	Houston, Texas	3612 Parkwood Drive	1938		
Wesley West House	Houston, Texas	Riverside Drive and Live Oak Street	1938	Demolished 1963	
Houston City Hall	Houston, Texas	901 Bagby Street	1939		
Parker Brothers and Company	Houston, Texas	5305 Navigation Boulevard	1939		
Houston Municipal Airport Terminal	Houston, Texas	8325 Travelair Street	1939	Operating as museum	
Abe Battelstein House	Houston, Texas	3615 Parkwood Drive	1940		
Carnation Company Creamery	Houston, Texas	701 Waugh Drive	1946	Demolished	
Beth Yeshurun Synagogue	Houston, Texas	3501 Southmore Avenue	1949	Now Lucian L. Lockhart Elementary School	
Sol Weingarten Family Home	Houston, Texas	3222 Oakmont Drive	1949	Abandoned; restoration in process	
Battelstein Building	Houston, Texas	812 Main Street	1950		George Rustay, junior partner
1952 Harris County Courthouse	Houston, Texas	1200 Congress Street	1953	Remodeled in 2006 and became the Harris County Juvenile Justice Center	Finger and Rustay; completed after Finger's death
Remodel of the 1910 Harris County Courthouse	Houston, Texas	301 Fannin Street	1956	Restoration to the original style began in March 2009.	Finger and Rustay; work started after Finger's death

== Bibliography ==
- Beasley, Ellen; Fox, Stephen (1996). Galveston Architectural Guidebook. Houston: Rice University Press. ISBN 978-0892633463.
- Bradley, Barrie Scardino (2020). Improbable Metropolis: Houston's Architectural and Urban History. Austin: University of Texas Press. ISBN 978-1477320198.
