= Houston City Hall =

City hall in Houston, Texas, U.S.

- Interactive map of the Houston City Hall area

General information
- Type: City hall
- Architectural style: Art Deco; Modernistic
- Location: 901 Bagby Street; Houston, Texas 77002
- Coordinates: 29.7602°N 95.3694°W
- Construction started: March 7, 1938; 88 years ago
- Completed: July 1939; 87 years ago
- Cost: US$1.67 million

Technical details
- Floor count: 10

Design and construction
- Architect: Joseph Finger
- Houston City Hall
- U.S. National Register of Historic Places
- Area: 3.1 acres (1.3 ha)
- NRHP reference No.: 90001471
- Added to NRHP: September 18, 1990

The Houston City Hall building is the headquarters of the City of Houston's municipal government. Constructed during 1938 and 1939, the City Hall complex is located on Bagby Street on the western side of Downtown Houston. It is surrounded by the Houston Skyline District and is similar in design to dozens of other city halls built in the southwest United States during the same time period. City Hall is flanked by Tranquility Park and the Houston Public Library. The simply designed structure featured many construction details that have helped to make this building an architectural classic.

== History ==
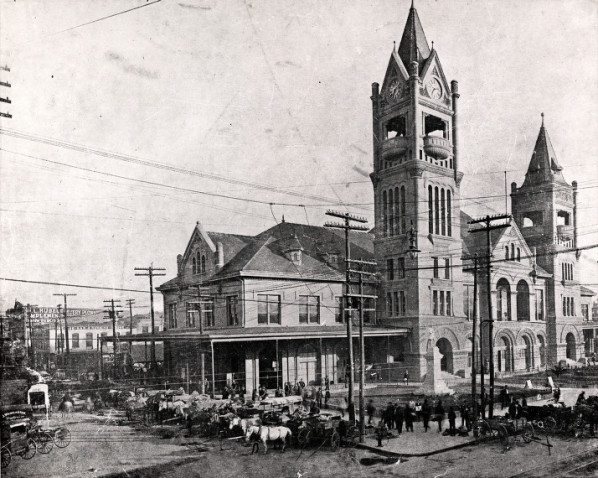
The City Hall and Market House, located on Travis Street at Prairie Avenue, was shared by the Houston city government and the city market.(1904)

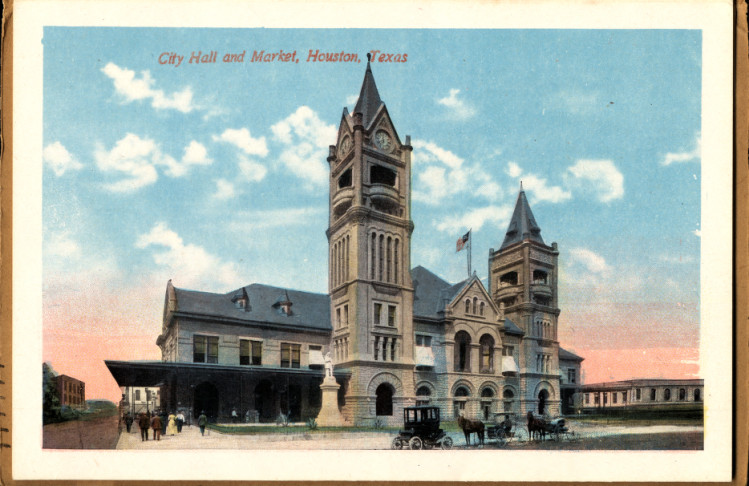
Houston City Hall and Market (postcard, circa 1912-1924)

From 1841 to 1939, Houston's municipal government was headquartered at Old Market Square. It was destroyed by fire in the 1870s, and also in 1901, and rebuilt each time. In those days, City Hall was part of the lively commercial atmosphere of the Square. However, by the 1920s, the city leaders decided the site was no longer appropriate for their needs.

In 1929, the city's planning commission urged the establishment of a civic center around a downtown park, Herman Square. However, the Great Depression sidetracked the plans for the new center. When President Franklin Delano Roosevelt instituted the Works Progress Administration program, the city applied for a WPA grant to help finance the construction of a new City Hall. The grant was approved, and construction began in March 1938, continuing for 20 months.

Joseph Finger had designed the city hall building in a stripped classical style. He wanted to place on the front terrace statues of John Kirby Allen and Augustus Chapman Allen, but the City of Houston lacked the funds needed to add the statues. The statues would have cost US$8,000 and the city was still suffering from the Great Depression. The Texas Star Chapter of the Daughters of the Republic of Texas (DRT) discovered this fact from reading a November 1939 article of the Scripps Howard Houston Press and publicized it in 2010. The statue project was dropped by the DRT chapter and the Oran M. Roberts Chapter 440, UDC, stepped in and raised the funds to have the Allen Brothers statues commissioned and cast in bronze.

On July 15, 2008, surgeon Michael E. Debakey would lie in state in Houston City Hall after he died the previous Friday due to natural causes, the first such honor for any deceased resident of the city. On July 29, 2024, Houston-based U.S. Congresswoman Sheila Jackson Lee would become the second person to lie in state in Houston City Hall. Former Houston mayor and Congressman Sylvester Turner would lie in state at Houston City Hall as well on March 11, 2025.

== Usage ==
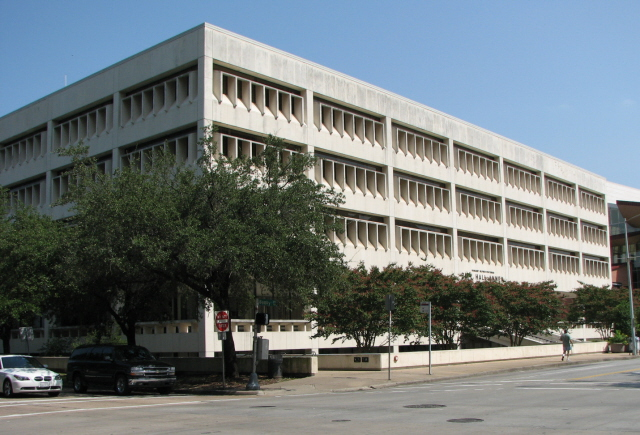
City Council Member offices located at City Hall Annex

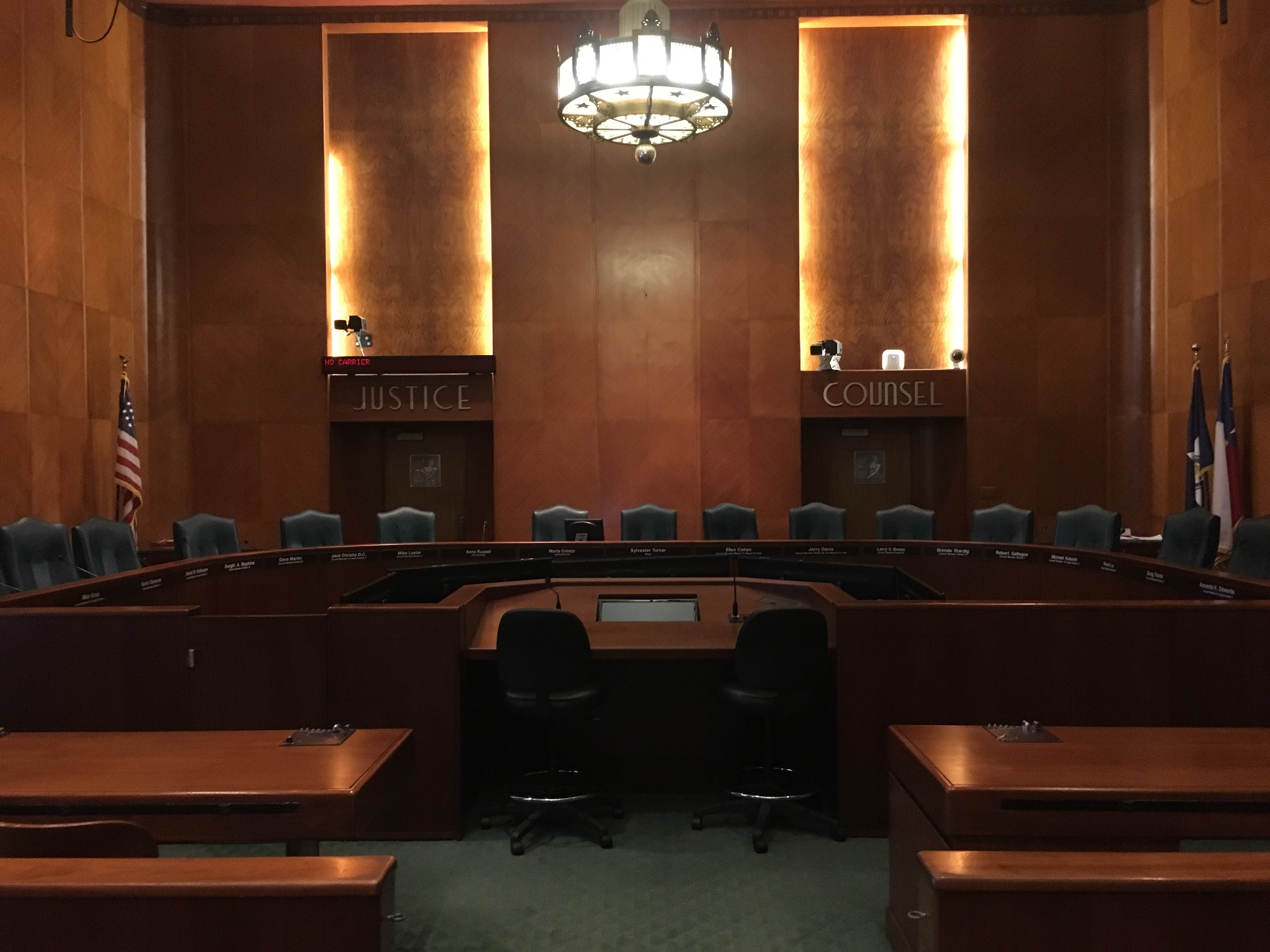
City Council Chambers

The Mayor of Houston and City Controller have their offices in this building. Council Members have their offices immediately across the street at the City Hall Annex building. Tuesdays at 1:30pm, and Wednesdays at 9:00am, Houston City Council meets in the chamber. All meetings are open to the public.

Beginning in October 2013, 12,000 Square feet of space on the West side of the first floor was renovated for use by HTV Houston Television ( HTV studios ). The renovations were overseen by Balfour Beatty Construction and were completed on March 14, 2014.

== Architectural details ==
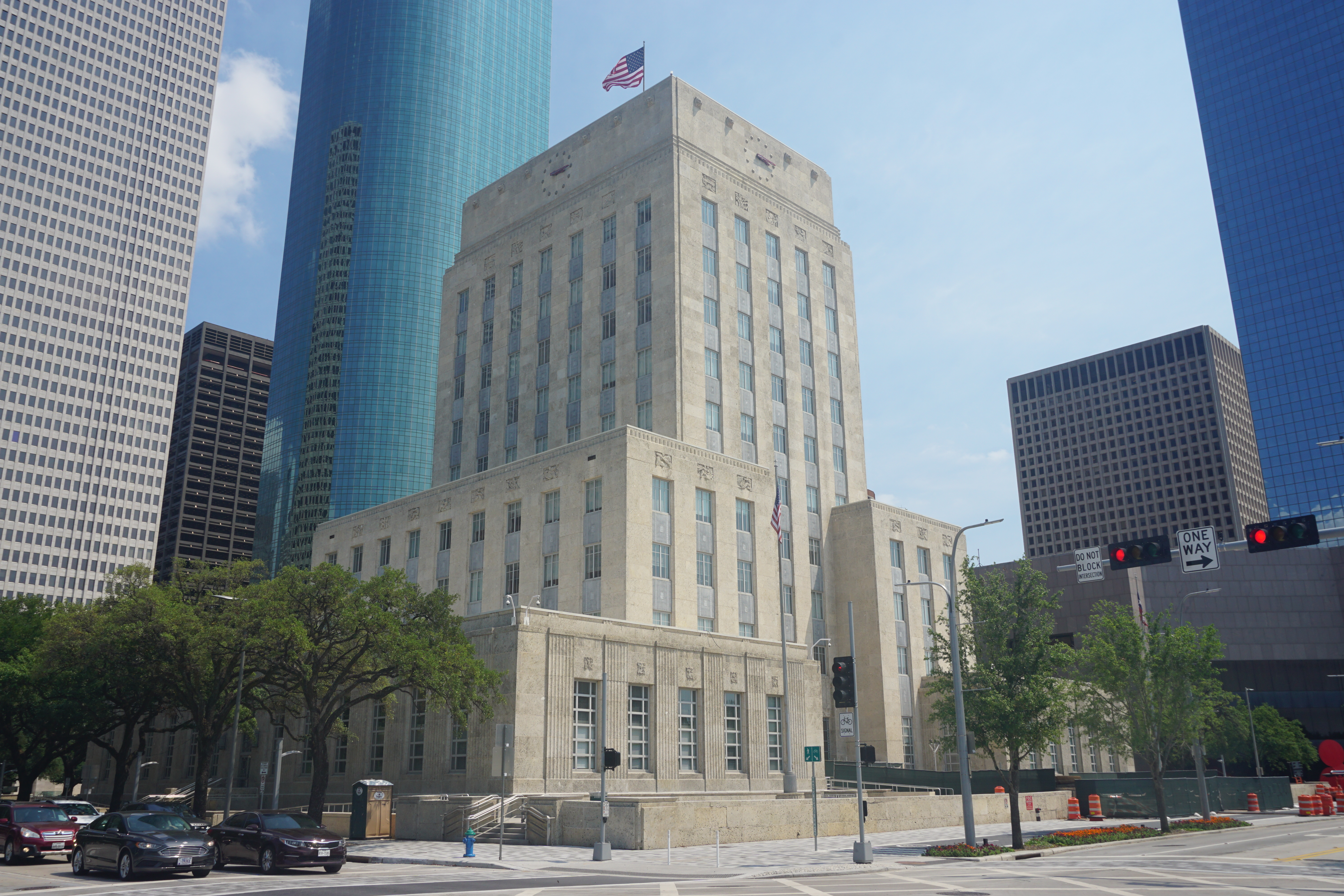
Houston City Hall

The architect of the City Hall was Joseph Finger, an Austrian-born Texan architect responsible for a number of Houston-area landmarks.

The exterior of the building features a sculpture by Herring Coe and Raoul Josset, and regional white, pock-market Texas limestone. The front faces Hermann Square, accessible by a series of paved terraces and stairs. The City hired Hare and Hare of Kansas City to design the rectangular pool and its surrounding landscaping, which includes lawns, rows of shrubs, and live oak trees.

The design on the lobby floor depicts the protective role of government. In the grillwork above the main entrances are medallions of "great lawgivers" from ancient times to the founding of America, including Thomas Jefferson, Charlemagne, Julius Caesar and Moses, and an outdated city seal adorns the interior doorknobs.

The building is faced with Texas Cordova limestone, and the doors to the building are of a specially cast aluminum. The lobby is walled with lightly veined marble. The gateways to the Tax Department are inlaid with bronze, nickel and silver. The elevator lobbies are treated with marble base, walls and wainscoting.

Above the lobby entrance is a stone sculpture depicting two men taming a wild horse, which is meant to symbolize a community coming together to form a government to tame the world around them. The plaster cast for this sculpture, and twenty-seven casts for friezes around the building, were done by Beaumont artist Herring Coe and co-designer Raoul Josset.

== Hermann Square ==
The front of the city hall building steps down to a small park, George and Martha Hermann Square, which is dominated by a reflecting pool. That was once the homestead of George H. Hermann for whom Hermann Park in the Museum District is named. Hermann Square contains a simple, but regal elegance and is regularly used for festivals, protests and concerts. To accommodate larger events, the reflecting pool is planked over and tents and kiosks are often erected.

Although there is some speculation about whether or not people are allowed to stay in the park overnight, the Parks Department officially says that people are not permitted to sleep there. In 1987, the city attorney's office stated in the Houston Chronicle that the police are not to arrest anyone sleeping in the park.
