= Tranquillity Park =

Park in downtown Houston

Coordinates: 29.7607°N 95.3683°W

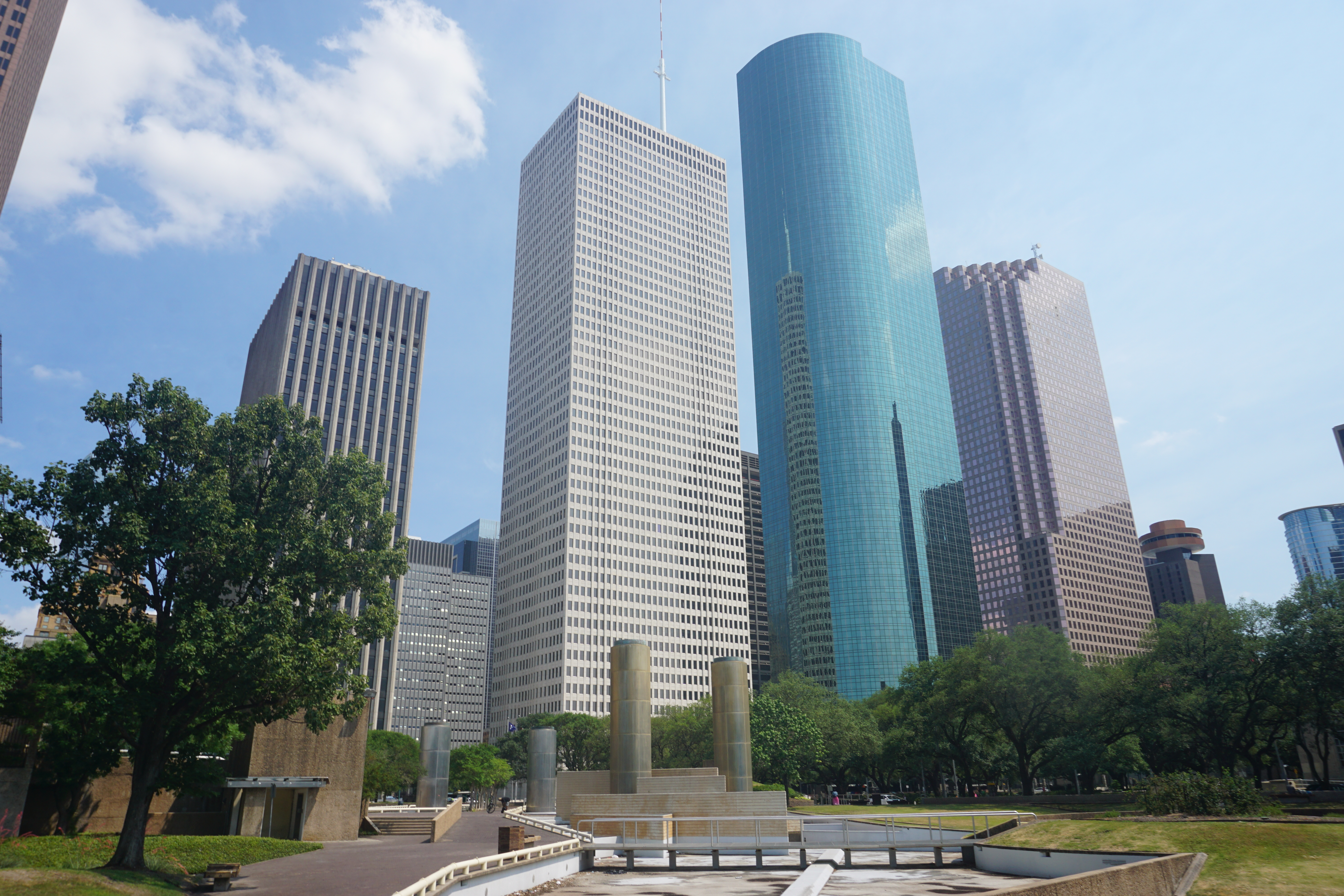
Tranquillity Park and the Houston skyline

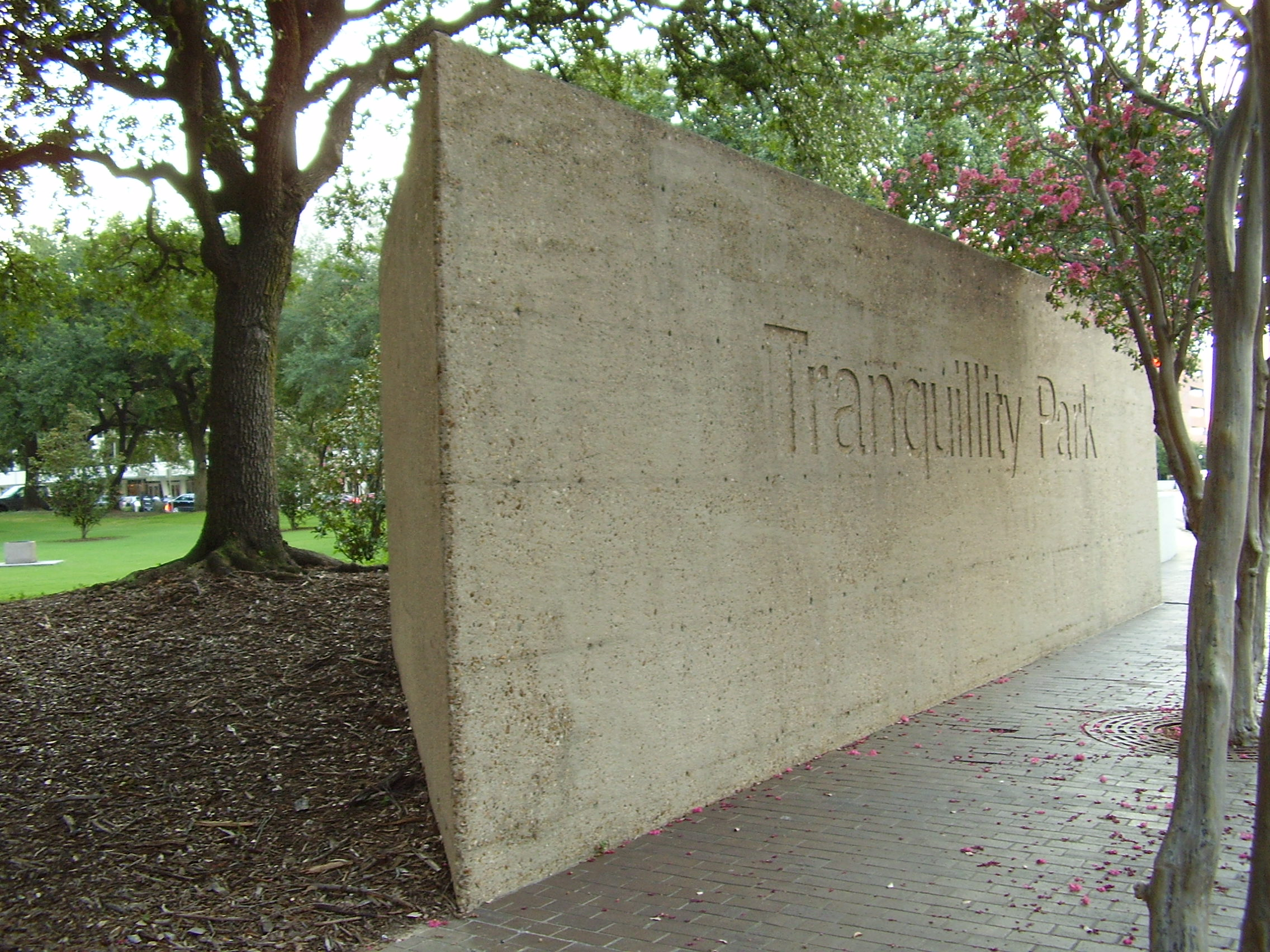
Tranquillity Park

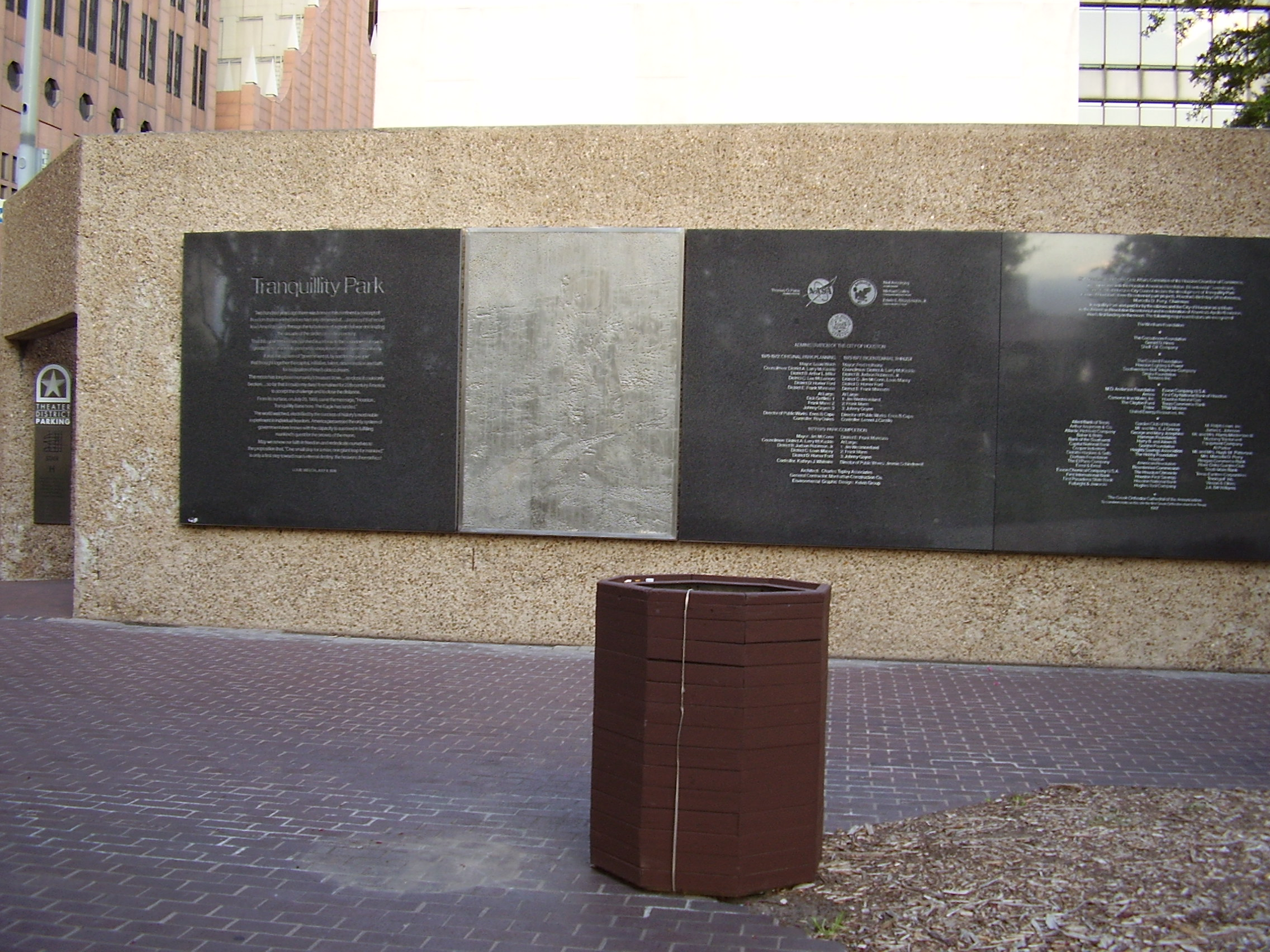
Tranquillity Park

Tranquillity Park is a municipal park in Houston, Texas.

== History ==
Tranquillity Park is a park located in Downtown Houston, Texas, between Walker and Rusk Streets, and west of Smith Street, with the United States federal courts building for the Southern District of Texas on one side and Houston City Hall on the other. It takes its name, notably differing in spelling, from the Sea of Tranquility, where man first landed on the Moon during the Apollo 11 mission on July 20, 1969. First opening to visitors in the summer of 1979, Tranquillity Park was officially dedicated on the tenth anniversary of the historic lunar landing. On bronze plaques placed along the main entrance, the first words transmitted by Neil Armstrong from the Moon, "Houston, Tranquility Base here. The Eagle has landed," are written in 15 languages. A replica of one of the footprints left on the Moon by Neil Armstrong is also on display inside the park.

Built over a new subterranean parking garage, the two-block-long oasis of water and walkways, mounds and depressions throughout the park are meant to represent the cratered lunar surface, and the park's 32-level Wortham Fountain. A key feature of the fountain are stainless steel cylinders. designed to resemble the Apollo 11’s rocket boosters, are a clever way of exhausting the parking garage below.

Each year, Tranquillity Park hosts many city functions, art shows, and events such as the Children's Festival and the Houston International Festival. The park is also popular with downtown office workers seeking a shady spot to picnic during their lunch hour. Additionally, North of the park is a pocket park containing memorials for each of the two Space Shuttle disasters.

Construction of Tranquillity Park was completed in 1979, implementing the plan of Charles Tapley and Jeffrey Lunow of Charles Tapley Associates.

On February 12, 2026, Mayor John Whitmier announced a renovation of the park which includes repairs related to differed maintenance, new lighting, and a reimagining/revitalization of the space to better engage surrounding civic and theater buildings and the public at large.

== See also ==
- Buzz Aldrin
- Tranquility Base
- Lunar Module Eagle
- Apollo 11 in popular culture
