= Slipcover (architecture) =

In architecture, a slipcover is a modification of an older building facing by adding a new ornamental layer.

The slipcover was a popular treatment in the United States after World War II, as early twentieth-century building styles had fallen out of fashion. Constructing a slipcover with a contemporary design over an existing building was a less expensive alternative to tearing down and building anew. Sometimes attachments of the slipcover caused damage to the original facings. At other times, slipcovers have protected the original facings from deterioration.

Slipcovers are used on structures. "Slipcovered buildings are those structures whose facade has been sheathed in a newer material which partially or completely masks the original".

== History of Slipcovers ==
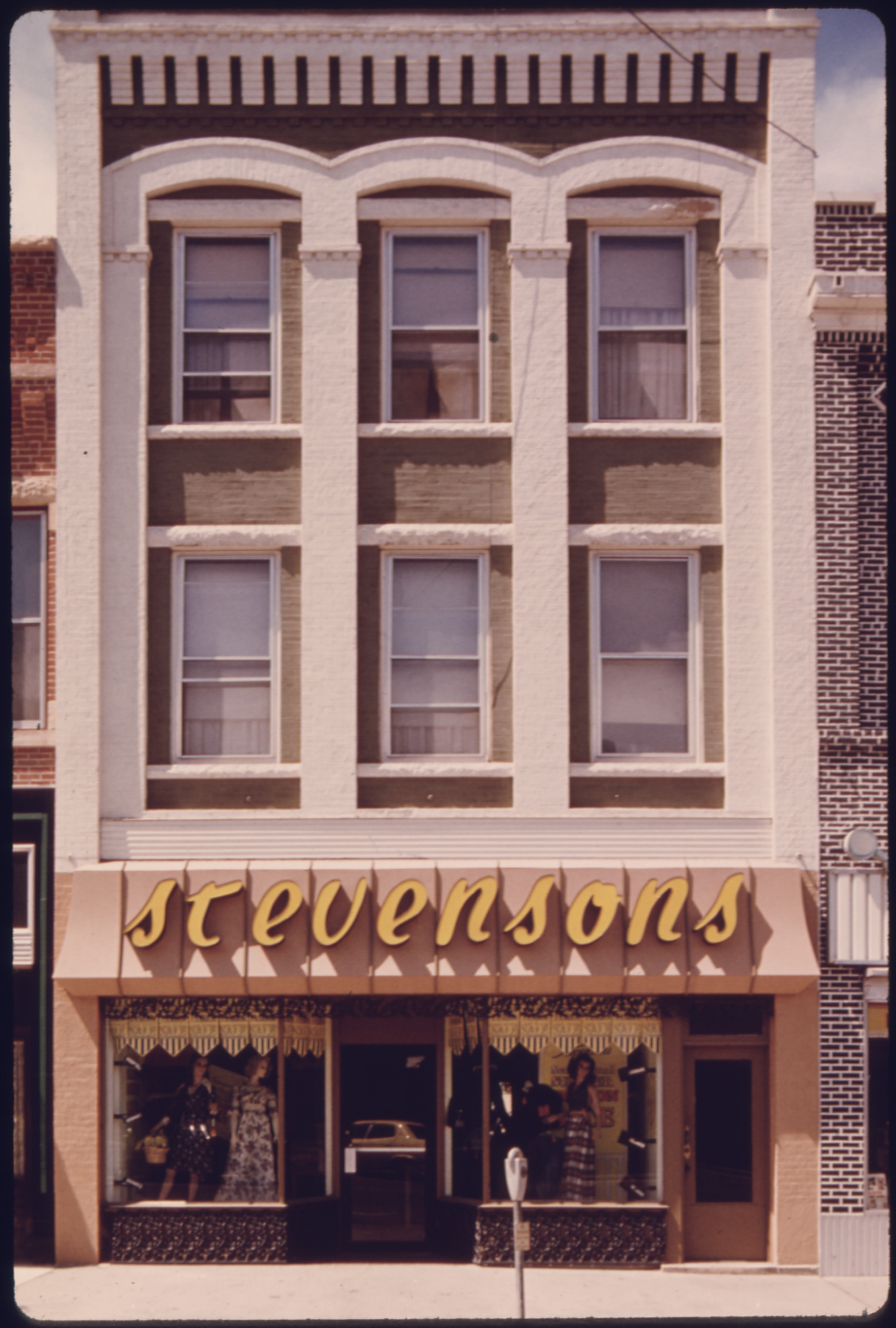
A newly restored and painted older storefront on Minnesota Street in New Ulm, Minnesota.

In the US, the slipcovering of buildings sparked prominence from the mid-1940s to the 1960s. Building owners applied these slipcovers to their old historic buildings in an effort to refresh their business and create a more modern appearance.

Following the Second World War, the architectural styles that were popular prior to the war were considered “passé” and were thought to not truly represent the ambitions of the “forward-thinking generation”. Hence, there became an indulgence in new, modern styles of Victorian, Classic Revival, Art Deco, and more early twentieth-century American commercial styles.

The Modern movement in architecture ignited the beginning of the architectural revolution. This was pioneered by architects and courageous clients who sought “innovative residential and institutional buildings”. Shopkeepers across the US were ready to join the movement by the middle of the 1930s thanks to the combination of architectural-design competitions and clever architectural promotions. As modernist buildings become historic, slipcovered structures create challenges for the preservation community in terms of evaluating and treating them. A majority of these slipcovered buildings have been standing for more than 50 years, the usual interval at which a building can be designated historic. It is critical to understand the evolution of design, the options for designation, and the treatment protocols.

Slipcovers are prevalently seen in the commercial sector. There has been rapid acceptance of modern architecture in this sector, as this could be the storefronts or movie theatres that utilise slipcovers on many streets around the world.

There are frequent renovations to storefronts, to adapt for new businesses or for a renewal of style. The use of slipcovers became more efficient and recognised when the architectural media, the sign industry, and the marketing departments of building-product industries became involved and promoted their products for the use of slipcovering. Additionally, trade publications from retailers and sign companies with a modernisation message were widely distributed.

Shopping malls are competition to store owners, so in the past 60 years, merchants and property owners have tried to 'imitate their competition' (the shopping mall). These 'attempts to modernise' were seen as 'pedestrian malls, covering traditional building fronts with aluminium slipcovers, and attaching huge, oversized signs on their buildings to attract attention'.

=== Timeline of Modern Slipcover Architectural Development ===
Mid 1940s: Introduced at this time in the mid-20th century, prominently in the US.

Mid 1940s-1950s: 'Continuation of competitive modernism'. Facades on Main Streets becoming 'angular three-dimensional sculptures and businesses erecting stand-alone pylon signs'. There was an increase in 'overarching visual control through aluminium slipcovering of older Main Street facades'.

1950s-1970s: The use of slipcovers was applied to many downtown Wisconsin buildings in these decades. Aluminium companies such as the Aluminium Company of America (Alcoa) started to manufacture and sell the large panels used for slipcovers.

== Use of Slipcovers ==
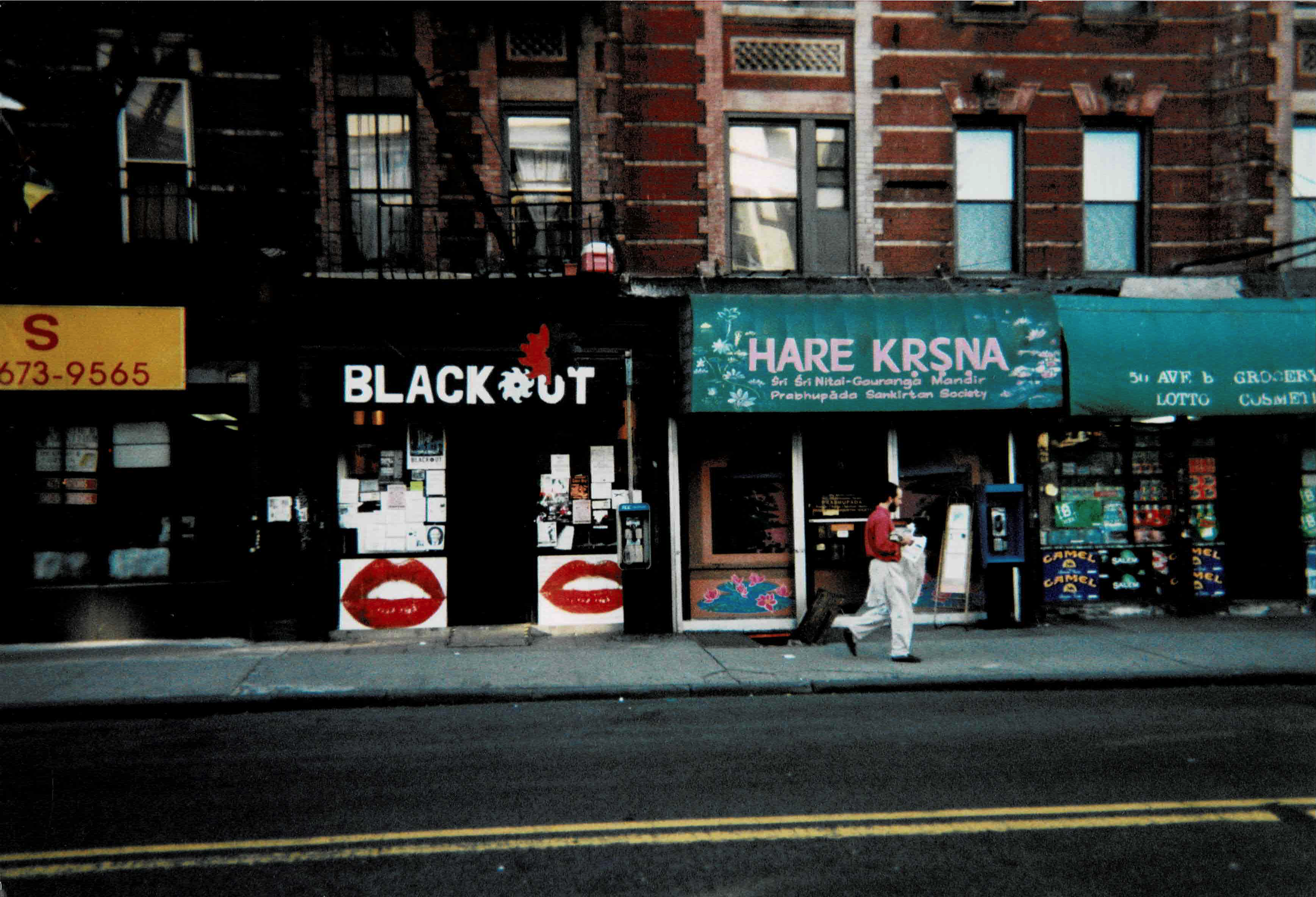
Slipcover of Blackout Books Storefront

Beneath the prefabricated metal panels or other materials that may have been used to construct a slipcover for a building, there is a concealed façade, which may be one of cultural or historical significance. One of the reasons for the use of slipcovers on buildings is that the historic appearance of the building can be restored at any time, by removing the slipcover.

The use of slipcovers has also been applied for business owners in the same area, who have covered their historic building fronts to obtain a visible “modernisation” of the area. Hence, slipcovers have the ability to change the overall expression of an area.

With slipcovers, sometimes the outside may relate to the inside of the building, while sometimes it may not. Nowadays, what is desired from a slipcover is not usually a classical façade, as inflation has led to the meticulous detail of classical styles to be too expensive.

Partially or completely covering a building can mask its original character, detail, and ornamentation, or the slipcover can even obliterate the original.

Due to the sheer size of larger commercial structures, most of which were occupied by offices and relying on natural light and ventilation, it was not practical or common to cover windows like they sometimes do in smaller buildings.

Slipcovers are commonly used for storefronts. As older, traditional buildings are sometimes quite large, there may be numerous, different slipcovers used for a variety of storefronts at the street level of these older buildings.

Slipcovers can be erected over buildings during renovation periods. The alterations to buildings to add slipcovers can be 'radical but reversible', as the slipcover can be removed at any time. Slipcovers create a division from the interior space and the slipcover on the primary facade.

== Structural Elements ==
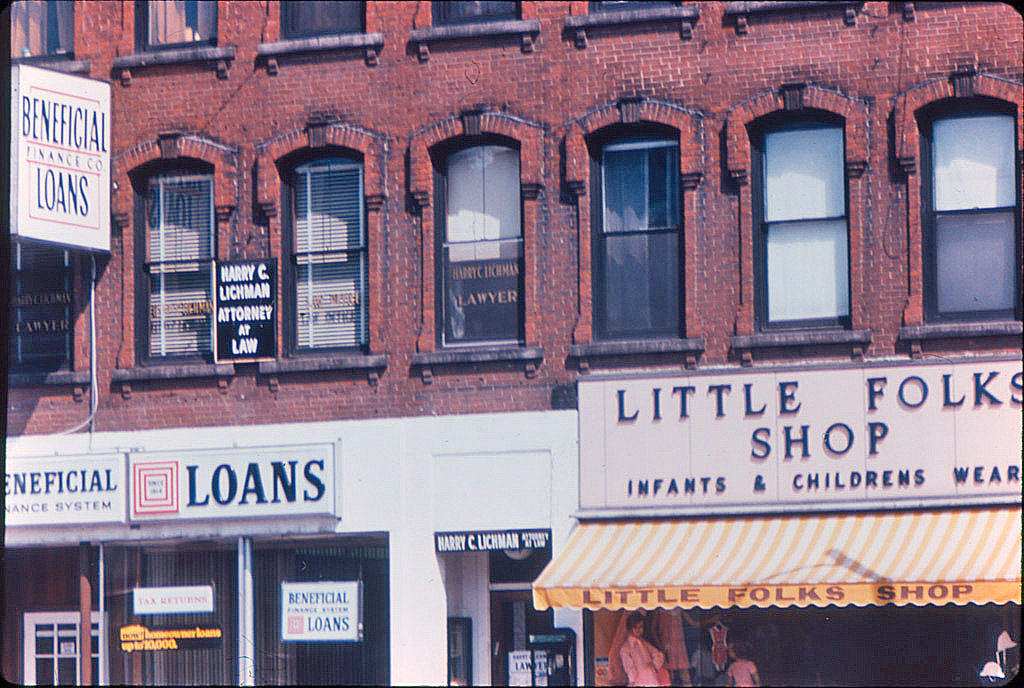
Storefronts on East Side of Central Square in Keene New Hampshire

Popular materials used in the construction of slipcovers include

- aluminium
- sheet metal
- plaster
- marble
- cast iron
- brick
- stone
- terra cotta

Slipcovers were most often made of aluminium or sheet metal. The panels used for slipcovering buildings are usually produced in industrial plants. The structural elements are then shipped to the site of use and erected over the existing façade. It is a complicated and delicate task to preserve modern buildings and those that have changed over time.

Popular materials such as plaster and marble caused extensive damage to the original facade beneath their installation.

Older buildings often had permanent exterior walls made of cast iron, brick, stone, and terracotta. Because these materials were integral to the façade, removing them during a cosmetic update was challenging. The majority of the time, they were simply covered over and, despite some damage, remain intact under the slipcovers. Some slipcovers have helped preserve the architectural details behind them by concealing them with their mask. Moreover, it varies in how much the slipcover altered the original appearance of the building.

Some examples of slipcovering include on commercial block buildings; 'the upper facade being stuccoed' and the window area being slipcovered. Additionally, on some commercial buildings, there may be a 'modern slipcover hiding the upper facade'. Another example is a 'metal slipcover on the upper facade and part of display windows'. There may also be instances where there is a 'stone facade treatment below the canopy and metal slipcover above'. Also, commercial block buildings may have wooden slipcovers with altered storefronts. The building blocks may have been built in 1900 and the facade be rebuilt in the mid-1950s.

== Gallery and Notable Examples ==
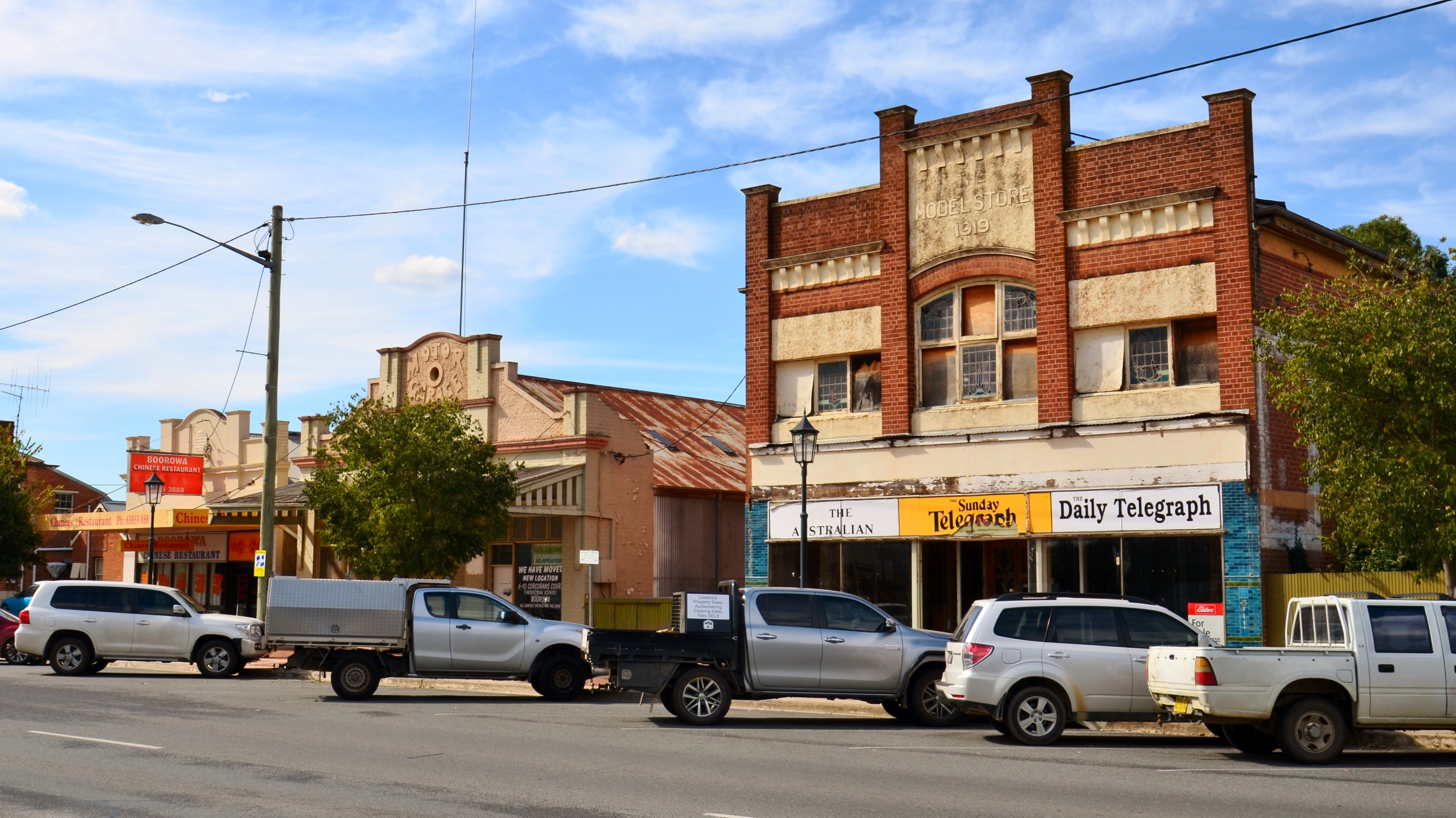
Main street of Boorowa, New South Wales. The building is the Model Store, built by the Learmonth family in 1918

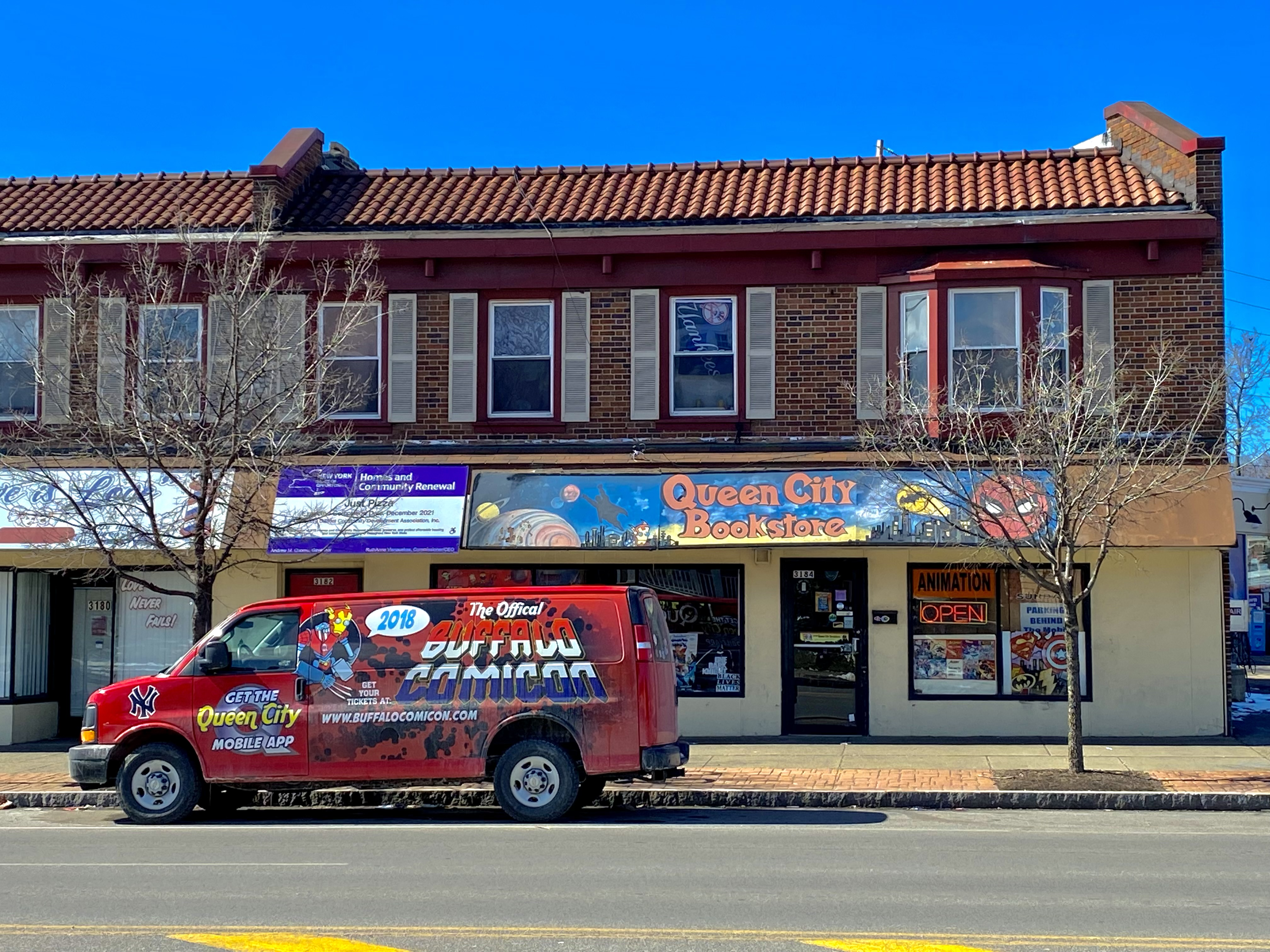
Queen City Bookstore, Buffalo, New York. Lavishly decorated with comic book - and superhero-inspired imagery as seen on a sunny afternoon in March 2022. Located in the former Granada Theatre building in the University Heights section of the city, the store has been in operation since 1969 and is a premier destination for local comic book and manga fans.

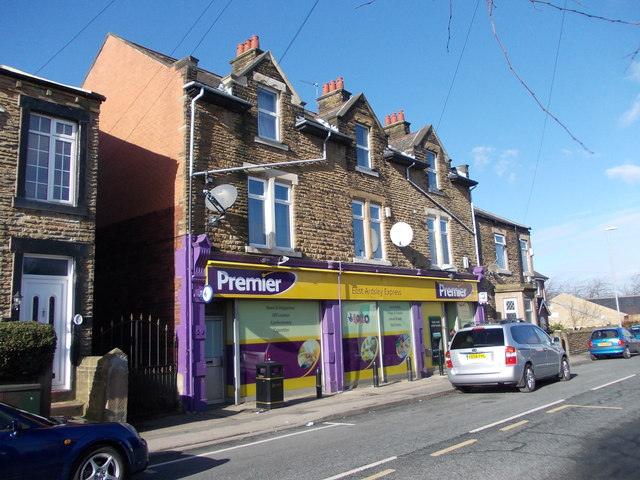
Premier Convenience Store, Main Street, East Ardsley, City of Leeds, England.

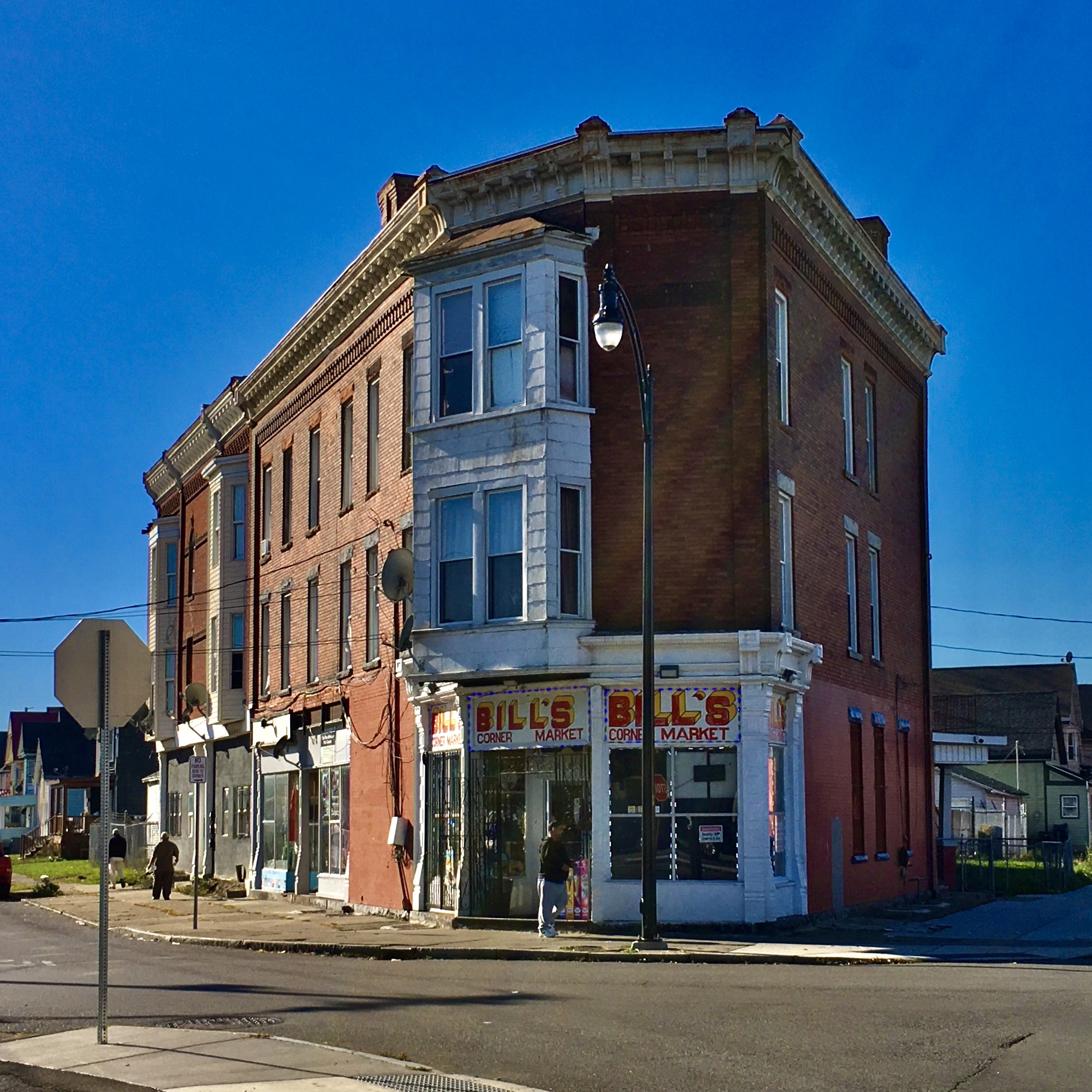
By Andre Carrotflower. Bill's Corner Market, 318 Hampshire Street at Arkansas Street, Buffalo, New York, November 2020. Without being representative of any particular style, the building is a fine example of your typical late-19th-century commercial architecture: salient details include a bracketed cornice circumnavigating the roofline with a dentil course beneath, rough-textured stone lintels and windowsills on the second and third floors, Classical-inspired pilasters separating the ground-floor storefront windows and framing the entrance, and - more unusually - a two-story, wooden projecting bay window appended to the corner.

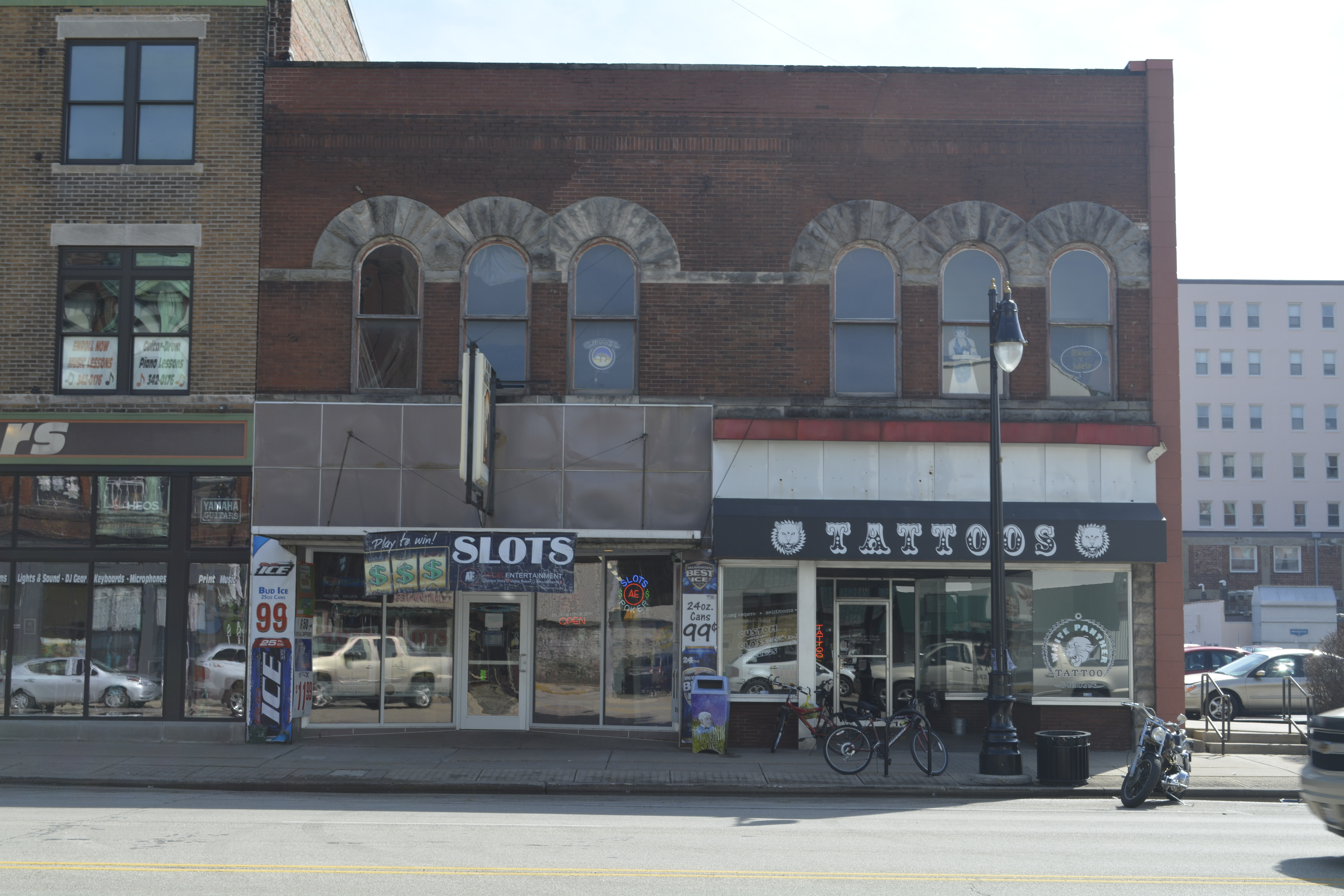
Storefronts on Main Street (US Hwy 150) in Downtown Galesburg

Storefronts, Austin, Texas
