= Elmwood (Dallas) =

- Neighborhood
- Interactive map of Elmwood
- Country: United States
- State: Texas
- City: Dallas
- Area: Oak Cliff
- Founded: 1924
- Founder: Lindsley Waters (original dairy farm)
- Time zone: UTC-6 (CST)
  - Summer (DST): UTC-5 (CDT)

Elmwood is a residential neighborhood in central Oak Cliff, within Dallas, Texas, composed of tudor cottages, craftsman bungalows and ranch-style homes built mostly in the 1920s through the 1950s surrounding a central greenbelt along the limestone banks of Cedar Creek (Texas).

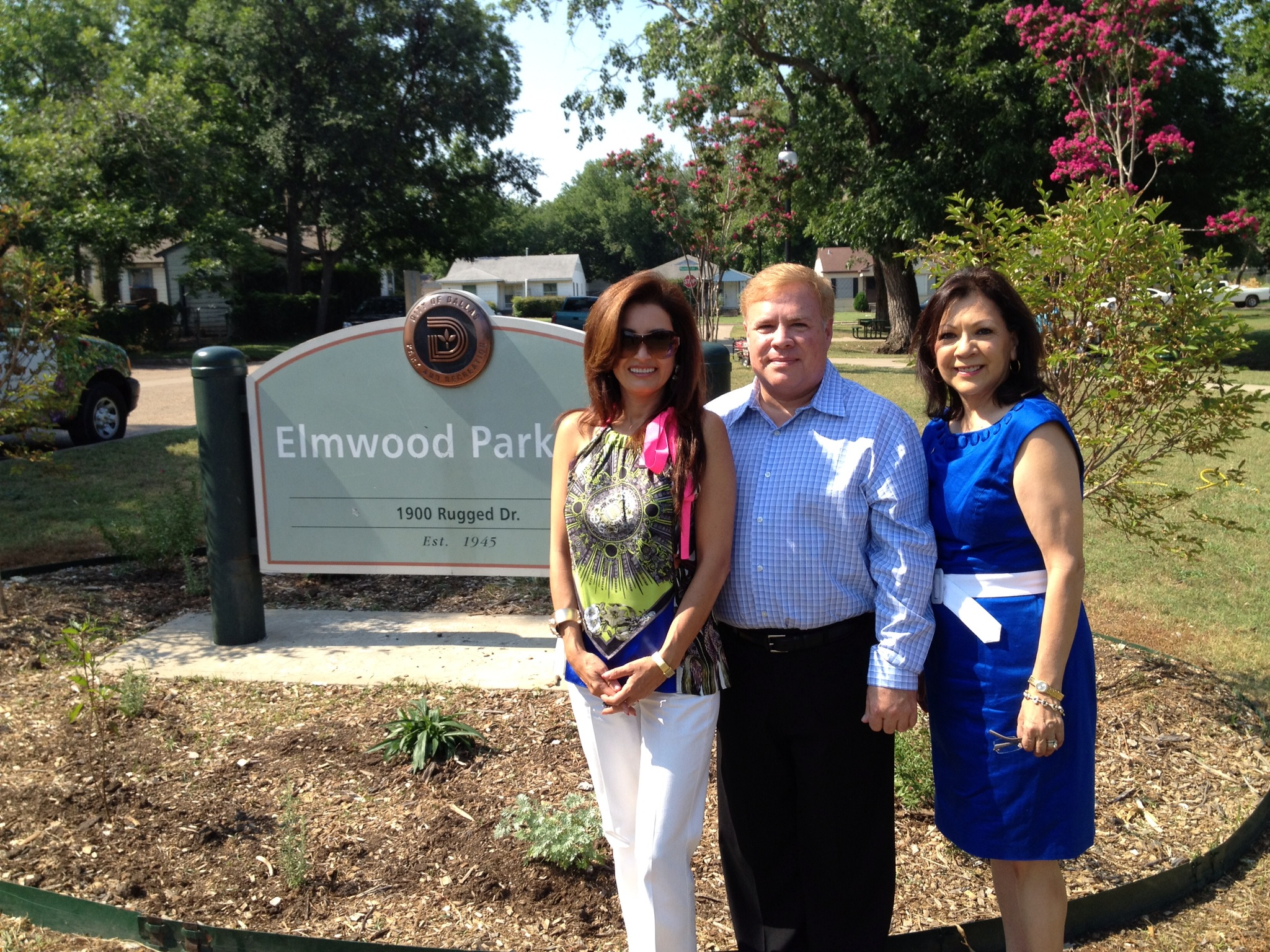
Elmwood Parkway Trail Dedication June 9, 2012

Elmwood Parkway is a focal point of the neighborhood. The 16-acre linear park follows Cedar Creek on the northern edge of the neighborhood and continues south along Elmwood Branch through the center. Founded in 1945, the park is filled with mature pecan, oak, elm, and hackberry trees and is home to a variety of birds and wildlife. It has play equipment and open spaces for sports and is a popular place for walking dogs and jogging. Elmwood has in recent years added to a network of walking trails that meander through the park as well as a crossing bridge and monarch butterfly waystation.

Conveniently walkable to two Dallas Area Rapid Transit light rail stations, Elmwood surrounds a small business district along Edgefield Avenue. "Downtown Elmwood" features a collection of small commercial buildings, professional offices, a Masonic Hall, an elementary school and churches. In 1988, this location was used to film the Main Street sequences in the 1989 movie Born on the Fourth of July starring Tom Cruise. Centered on Edgefield and Ferndale avenues, the business district has seen a modest resurgence in the 2010s as gentrification spreads from the popular Bishop Arts District, neighborhoods like Winnetka Heights, Dallas and other areas of North Oak Cliff. Starting with a concentrated effort by the neighborhood, murals, festivals and a monthly pop-up dog park have been organized as part of a concerted revitalization. The Elmwood Neighborhood Association is currently working on plans to establish the dog park, Elmwoof, as a permanent feature of Downtown Elmwood.

== Pre-war History ==
Elmwood began as the Tennessee Dairy founded by Lindsley Waters in 1907. With just 20 cows and covering 640 acres (2.6 km^{2}), the dairy was a corporate operation and a modern facility that was the first in Dallas to deliver pasteurized milk in glass bottles, even winning "most sanitary dairy farm" at the 1908 State Fair of Texas. Remnants of the farm exist to this day, including a house on Brunner Avenue reputed to be the dairy foreman's quarters and portions of an old stone wall that divided the farm, which are visible along the 1700 block of S. Edgefield, near Elmwood Blvd. After a fire destroyed the farm in 1919, Mr. Waters moved production to Deep Ellum, Dallas, desiring a near-downtown location in order to expedite deliveries. In 1924, real estate developer Frank G. Jester purchased the land from Southwest National Bank and platted the Elmwood Addition, selling quality homes in a "park-like" and "restful" setting just outside the southern boundary of Oak Cliff at the time. Construction slowed during the Great Depression but boomed in the post-war years, continuing until the 1950s when a much larger residential and retail development, Wynnewood, Dallas, opened to the east.

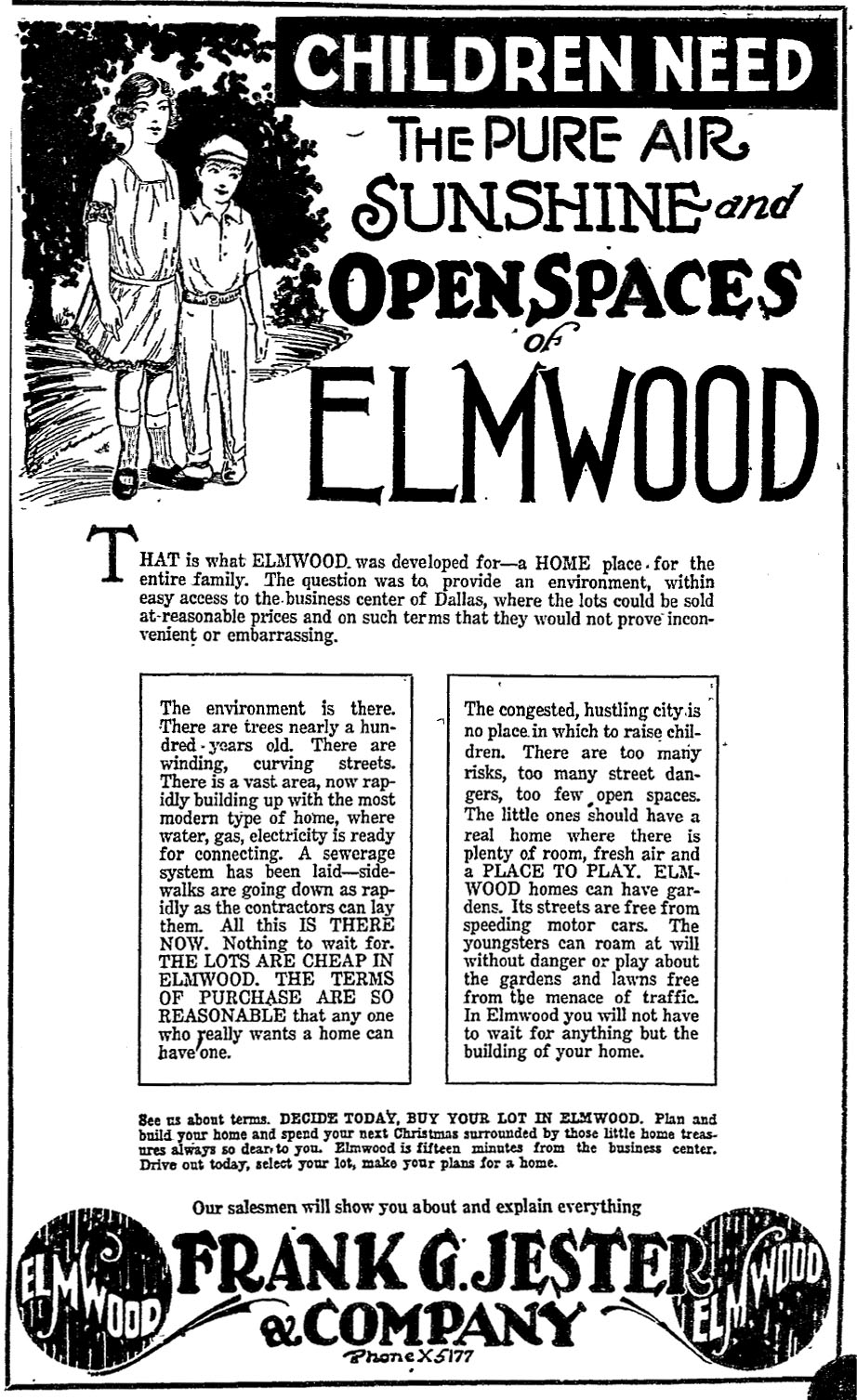
A 1920s Dallas Morning News advertisement for Elmwood Addition describes it as an ideal place for raising children.

The neighborhood opened its only school – later named after beloved Irish-immigrant teacher Margaret B. Henderson – in 1929. It was the first Dallas school named after a living Dallasite. In less than 10 years, however, the wood frame building was so obsolete that a Dallas Morning News story quoted several residents from Lansford Ave, Melbourne Ave and Brunner Ave calling it "an impossible condition," "a disgrace to the Dallas school system" and "the worst school in all Dallas." A modern brick structure with an iconic frieze opened in 1941, four years before the entirety of Elmwood was annexed by Dallas as part of a seven-square-mile annexation vote. Perhaps the most active civic group in Elmwood was the Elmwood Dads Club made up of fathers of Margaret B. Henderson pupils. They sponsored an annual picnic at Kiest Park, advocated for neighborhood improvements and hosted an achievement night in May 1950 to celebrate the neighborhood's progress over the previous six years.

== Post-war to Present Day ==
The late 1950s and early 1960s were a time of great prosperity for most of Oak Cliff, with many businesses catering to the new Baby Boomer generation. One such business, Austin's Bar-B-Cue on the corner of Hampton Rd and Illinois Ave, reigned as the destination of choice for thousands of diners with its sliced beef sandwiches, fries, coleslaw, beans, ribs, steaks and "to-die-for" burgers. Police officer J. D. Tippit moonlighted at Austin’s, working security on weekends. Austin's closed in July 2000 when it was replaced by an Eckerd pharmacy.

In November 1988, Downtown Elmwood was the filming location for a number of scenes in the movie Born on the Fourth of July starring Tom Cruise. Margaret B. Henderson was used for Ron Kovic's high school and Edgefield Ave was transformed for two parade sequences set in Massapequa, Long Island. Faux storefronts for ice cream shops, jewelers and insurance agencies lined the movie set. Tom Cruise later paid for a half-page advertisement in the Oak Cliff Tribune to thank Oak Cliff for its hospitality.

The same month, neighbors became aware of plans by food packaging manufacturer Dixie Wax Paper Company, later Dixico Inc. – an Elmwood-area business since 1932 – to request regulatory state and EPA approval for burning hazardous solvents, alcohols, inks and other liquid wastes at its plant at 1300 S. Polk St. The company insisted that its incineration methods were environmentally sound, but neighbors pushed back by organizing the group "Individuals & Residents Against Toxic Emissions" (IRATE). A year-long battle culminated in 400 people attending a public hearing; Dixico ultimately withdrew its application, citing too much time wasted on the effort. In 1996 Dixico sold the building to Delta Industries – which refurbished automotive air conditioners on-site until January 2015 – and in 2016 the building became Tyler Station: a light-manufacturing space, "co-working village" and brewery.

== Notable residents ==
Brunner Clarence Barnes (1917-1985) attended Winnetka Elementary school (later renamed W.E. Greiner Junior High) and graduated from Sunset High School (Texas) in 1935 and Texas A&M University in 1940. He retired as a Major in World War II, where he had served in army chemical warfare, then returned to Dallas and worked as a chemical engineer for the Magnolia Oil Company until 1960 when he co-founded Barnes & Click Engineering, later acquired by R. W. Beck, Inc. Brunner Ave in Elmwood is named after Brunner Barnes from when he was a childhood friend of John Collier, the son of an original Elmwood developer responsible for naming and designing streets in the early days of the neighborhood.

Dallas Police Department Sergeant Samuel Quinton Bellah (1926-2008) lived in 2219 Wilbur for several years in the 1960s. On November 22, 1963 he was part of the advance presidential motorcade along with Glen C. McBride and J.B. Garrick assigned to cut off Stemmons Freeway traffic well ahead of the main motorcade escorting the presidential limousine on its way to the Dallas Trade Mart. He is mentioned in the Warren Commission Report and several other documents examining the assassination of President John F. Kennedy.

== Boundaries & Accessibility ==
The neighborhood is bounded on the north by the Dallas Area Rapid Transit (DART) Red Line, on the south by Illinois Avenue, on the east by Polk Street and on the west by Hampton Road. It is walking distance to Hampton station (DART) and Tyler/Vernon station and a less than five-minute drive to Interstate 35 via Illinois Ave. In 2016, a trail extension opened connecting Elmwood Parkway to the 263-acre Kiest Park to the south. Funding from the 2017 municipal bond program will extend the trail northeast along Cedar Creek.
