= Wurster =

Wurster is a surname. Notable people with the surname include:

- Carl Wurster (1900–1974), German chemist
- Catherine Bauer Wurster (1905–1964), American social housing pioneer
- Charles D. Wurster, US Coast Guard admiral
- Charles Frederick Wurster (1930–2023), American biochemist, environmental activist, and professor of environmental science
- Donald C. Wurster, US Air Force general
- Frederick W. Wurster (1850–1917), last mayor of Brooklyn, New York
- Jon Wurster (born 1966), American musician and comedian
- William Wurster (1895–1973), American architect
- Wolfgang W. Wurster (1937–2003), German researcher in the fields of architecture and archaeology
