= Trammell Crow Company =

American real estate firm

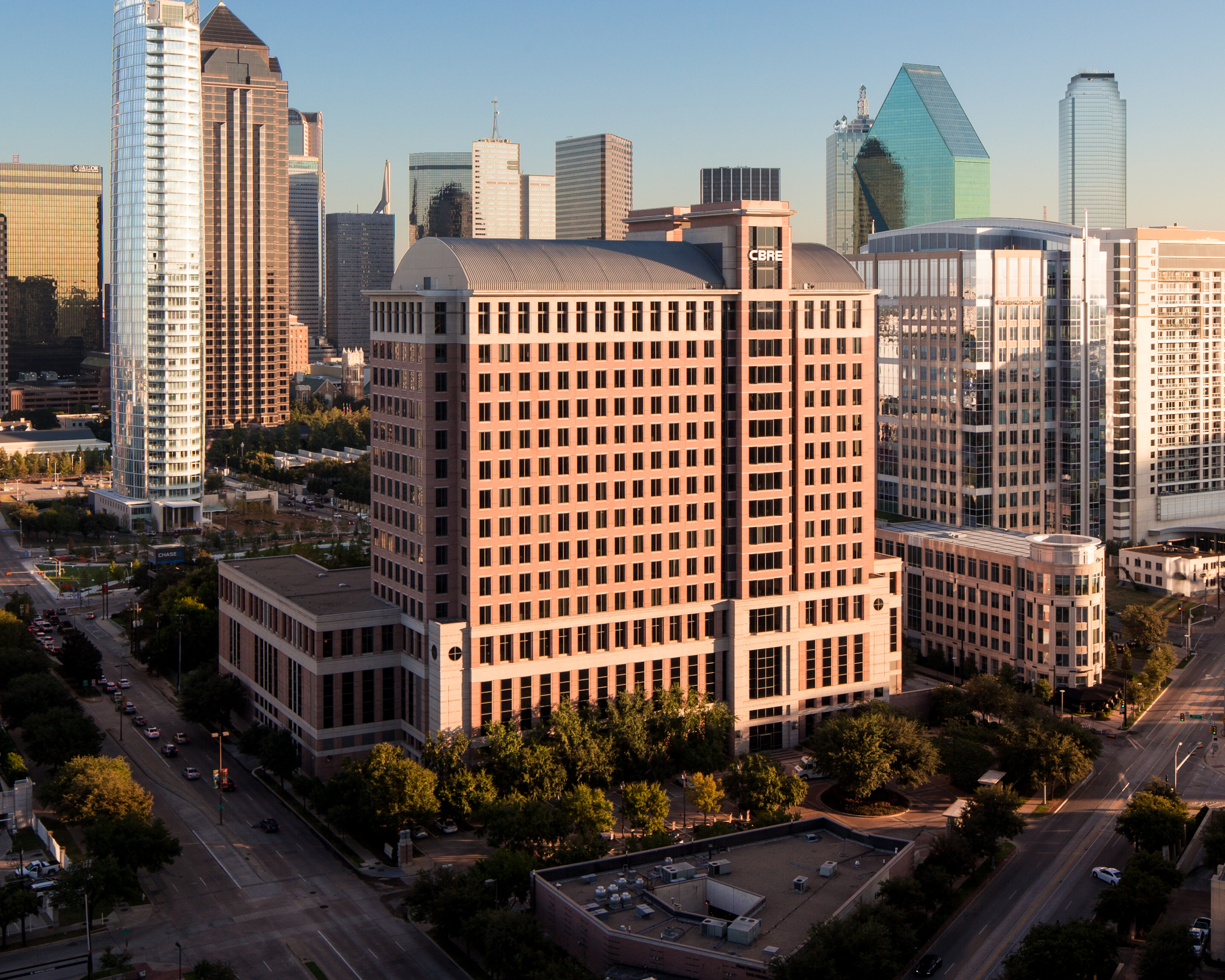
- 2100 McKinney Ave, headquarters of the Trammell Crow Company
- Type: Subsidiary
- Industry: Real estate
- Founded: 1948; 78 years ago
- Founder: Trammell Crow
- Headquarters: Dallas, Texas
- Parent: CBRE Group
- Website: www.trammellcrow.com

Trammell Crow Company is a global real estate development firm. It has been a subsidiary of CBRE Group since 2006.

== History ==
The company was founded by Trammell Crow in 1948.

Crow, who had left the Navy in 1946 and worked briefly as a grain dealer, began developing real estate full-time in 1948 at age 33. His first significant project was warehouse space for the Ray-O-Vac company, which launched the firm into industrial development in the postwar economy. During the 1950s the company expanded into retail and office projects, among the first of which was the Hartford Insurance Building, and began developing outside Texas through alliances with Georgia developers Frank Carter and Ewell Pope, first in Atlanta warehouses and later in Peachtree Center.

Crow's early warehouses were built on reclaimed Trinity River bottomland owned by brothers John and Storey Stemmons, whose father, Leslie Stemmons, had led the construction of the levee system that turned the floodplain into developable land. Other developers had been unwilling to build there because of the river's history of flooding. The Stemmonses contributed their land as collateral in exchange for a half interest in what Crow built on it, and Crow persuaded his lender, the First National Bank of Dallas, to finance construction on the value of the land and building alone rather than requiring a signed long-term lease first, a practice that became known as speculative or "spec" building. His warehouses also broke with the prevailing attached-row form: each stood on its own lot, with loading docks moved to the side, windowed offices in front, and landscaped grounds. By the mid-1950s Crow was the largest warehouse builder in Dallas, and most of the Trinity Industrial District, the city's first large postwar warehouse area, was built by his company in the 1950s and 1960s.

After building a small decorative center in the Trinity Industrial District to house rug manufacturers, Crow began the Dallas Homefurnishings Mart in 1956, a $6.5 million project on land the Stemmonses again contributed for a half interest, over the opposition of the furniture industry's established marts in Chicago and High Point, North Carolina. It was followed by the Trade Mart, begun in 1958 and built around an interior atrium that Crow claimed was the first in modern American architecture, and the Apparel Mart in 1964; together these buildings became the Dallas Market Center. The Stemmons Towers, four office buildings constructed along Stemmons Freeway between 1963 and 1968, were among the first high-rises in Dallas built outside downtown. Crow and John Stemmons dissolved their partnership in the market buildings in 1974.

The firm was organized as a network of partnerships rather than a conventional company. Crow treated his associates as partners, paying a negligible base salary while giving them ownership stakes in the projects they developed, and the company generally retained ownership of completed properties for leasing rather than selling them. By the late 1960s it had seven offices and roughly 100 partnership arrangements; by the mid-1970s, about 200 employees in 15 offices and some 600 partnerships.

In October 2006, the company agreed to be acquired by CB Richard Ellis Group for approximately $2.2 billion. The merger closed on December 20, 2006; CB Richard Ellis paid $49.51 in cash for each share of Trammell Crow Company common stock, and Trammell Crow's chairman and chief executive, Robert E. Sulentic, joined the acquirer's board of directors.

In 2010, the company moved its headquarters from Trammell Crow Center to 2100 McKinney Ave.
