= CityTime payroll scandal =

2003–2010 corruption scandal in New York

The CityTime payroll scandal was a 2003–2010 public corruption scandal in which several contractors, namely from SAIC, fraudulently inflated project costs for implementing the New York CityTime electronic payroll and timekeeping system.

== Background ==
CityTime was a New York City contract to build a timekeeping and payroll system for city employees, awarded to SAIC as a no-bid, $63 million contract in 2003. In the following years, the contract ballooned to $700 million, as consultant rates were artificially inflated, and contract terms were adjusted to make the city responsible for "cost overruns".

== Indictment and prosecution ==
In February 2011, US Attorney Preet Bharara announced the indictment of five consultants working on CityTime, for misappropriating more than $80 million from the project. The investigation expanded to five additional defendants being charged, including a consultant who allegedly received more than $5 million in illegal kickbacks on the projects. Ultimately, three contractors were sentenced to 20 years.

In 2012 SAIC was ordered to pay $500 million to the City of New York for overbilling the city over a period of seven years on the CityTime contract. In 2014 Gerard Denault, SAIC's CityTime program manager, and his government contact were sentenced to 20 years in prison for fraud and bribery related to the contract.
