= Charles D. Wurster =

United States Coast Guard officer

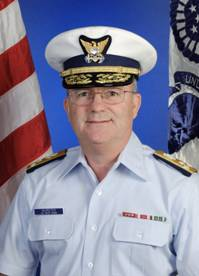
- Vice Admiral Charles D. Wurster
- Education: United States Coast Guard Academy (1971)
- Military career
- Allegiance: United States of America
- Branch: United States Coast Guard
- Service years: 1971–2008
- Rank: Vice admiral
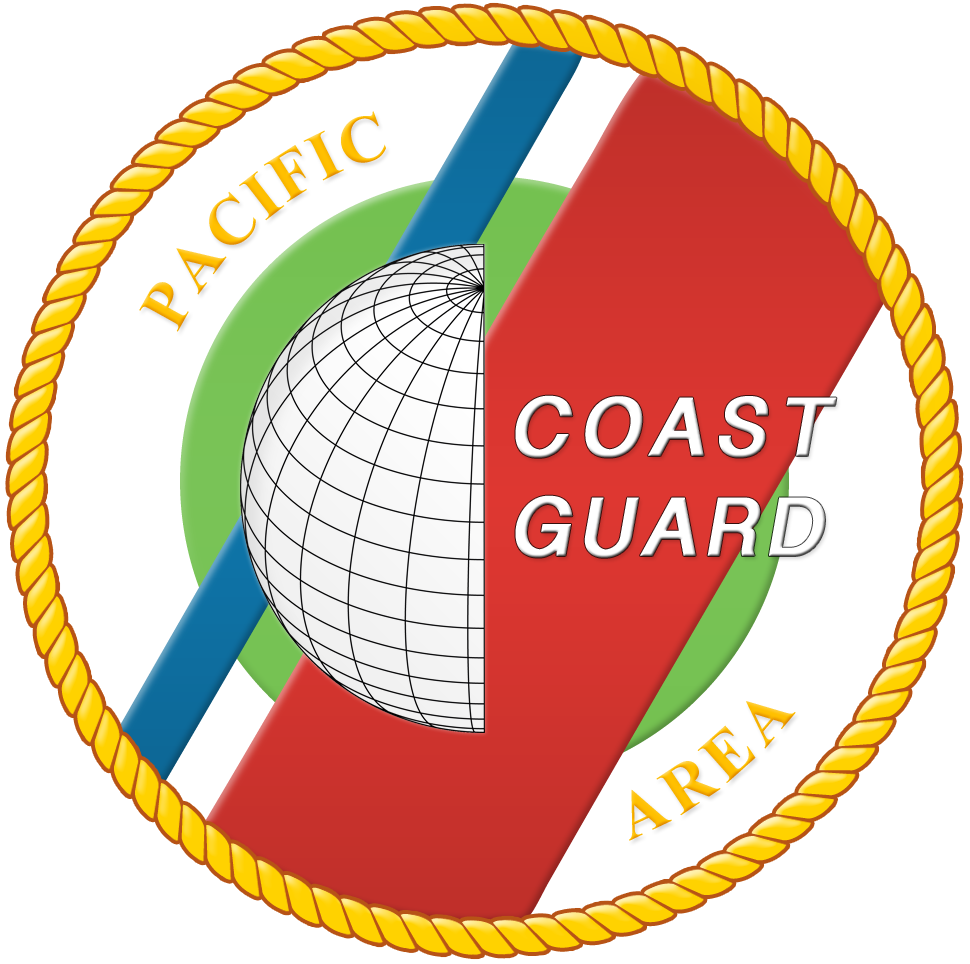
- Commands: USCG Pacific Area
- Awards: Legion of Merit Meritorious Service Medal (four awards); Coast Guard Commendation Medal (two awards) Coast Guard Achievement Medal (two awards)
- Other work: President/CEO of the Port of San Diego; National Commodore, Sea Scouts

Coast Guard Vice Admiral's Flag

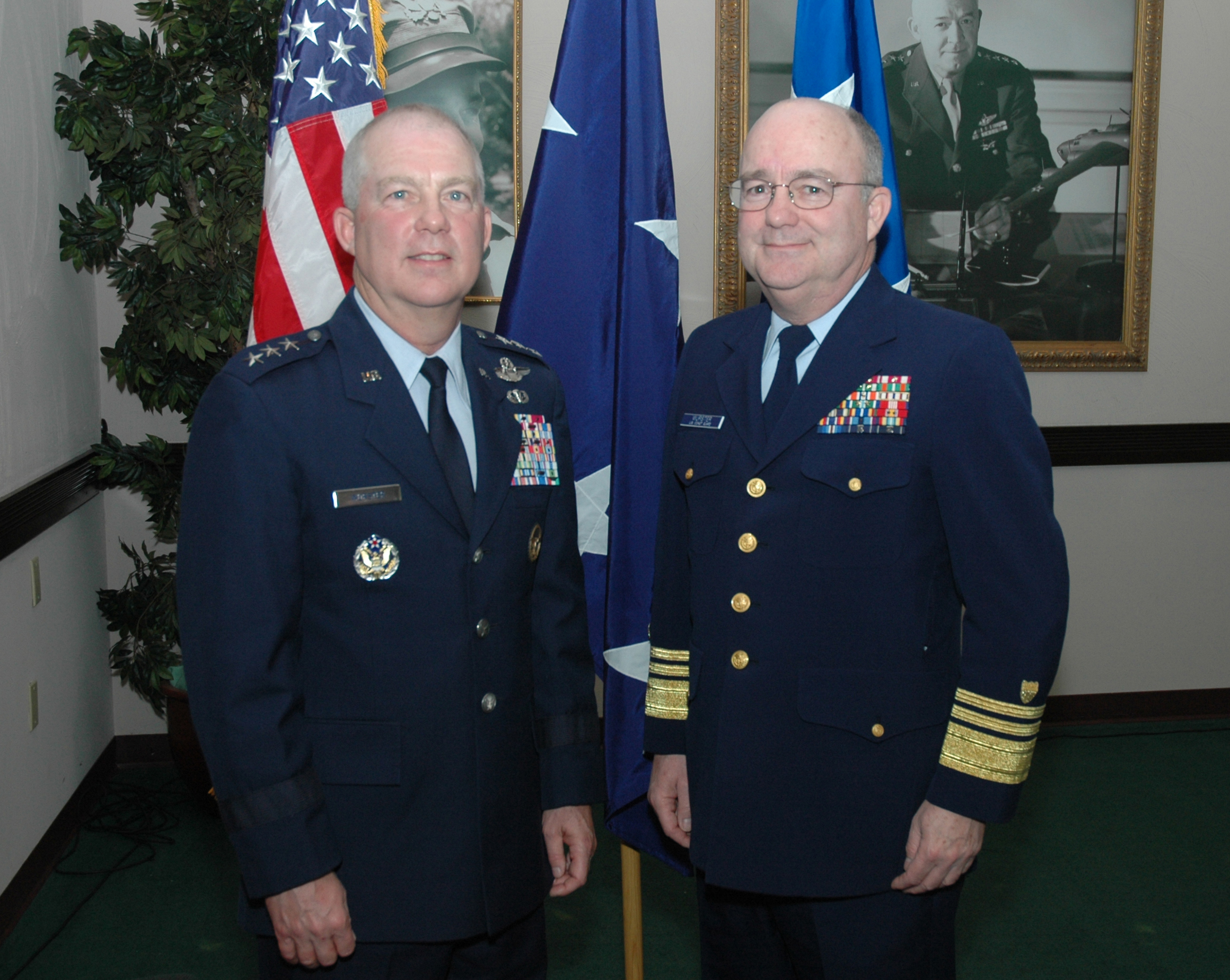
Lt. Gen. Donny Wurster (left), Air Force Special Operations Command commander, and Vice Adm. Charles Wurster (right), U.S. Coast Guard Pacific Area commander. Two brothers, six stars.

Charles D. Wurster is a retired vice admiral in the United States Coast Guard who last served as the Commander, Pacific Area and Commander, Defense Force West. He is now retired from the Coast Guard, is the President/CEO of the Port of San Diego (Jan 2009), and serves as national commodore of the Sea Scouting division of the BSA.

== Education and early career ==
Wurster is a 1971 honors graduate of the U.S. Coast Guard Academy. He received a master's degree in civil engineering from the University of Illinois in 1976 and is a 1993 graduate of the Industrial College of the Armed Forces. He is a registered Professional Engineer and is a Fellow of the Society of American Military Engineers.

As a junior officer, he served as a Deck Watch Officer aboard Coast Guard Cutter Steadfast, St. Petersburg, Florida, and as Commanding Officer of LORAN-A Station at Cape Sarichef, Alaska. Wurster has also been assigned to Civil Engineering duties at the Thirteenth Coast Guard District, Seattle, Washington; the Eighth Coast Guard District, New Orleans, Louisiana; Coast Guard Headquarters, Washington, D.C.; and as Facilities Engineer at Training Center Petaluma, California.

== Flag officer ==
Wurster assumed his duties as Commander, Coast Guard Pacific Area in May 2006. The Area of Operations for this command encompasses over 73,000,000 square miles (190,000,000 km^{2}) throughout the Pacific Basin to the Far East. Wurster was responsible for overseeing the operation of units performing missions in maritime safety, maritime mobility, protection of natural resources, maritime security, homeland security, and national defense.

Prior to this assignment, he served as Commander of the Fourteenth Coast Guard District in Honolulu, Hawaii. He also served as Assistant Commandant for Acquisition at Coast Guard Headquarters, Washington, D.C. Acquisition projects under Wurster's oversight included Rescue 21, a complete renewal of the National Distress and Response System; replacement of 180 aircraft, cutters, patrol boats, and motor lifeboats; plus acquisition of hundreds of fast response boats.

Wurster's other recent assignments include Chief of Staff to Commander Coast Guard Pacific Area, Alameda, California; Commanding Officer of Coast Guard Integrated Support Command Kodiak, Alaska; Commanding Officer of Coast Guard Facilities Design and Construction Center Pacific, Seattle, Washington; and Chief of the Civil Engineering Division, Maintenance and Logistics Command Pacific, Alameda, California.

== Awards and personal information ==
His awards include Legion of Merit (four awards) and the Society of American Military Engineers Sverdrup Medal. He is also the recipient of nine unit and meritorious unit commendations.

His brother Donald C. Wurster is a lieutenant general in the United States Air Force. The Wurster family has a record of military service dating back to the Revolutionary War. As three-star flag officers, the brothers also hold the highest rank of anyone in their family. Their father, retired U.S. Air Force Colonel Charles A. Wurster, was a P-51 Mustang and F-80 (P-80) pilot in the Korean War.

== Retirement and later work ==
Wurster retired on May 29, 2008, and passed command to Vice Admiral David Pekoske.

Wurster was a member of the Boy Scouts of America as a youth and earned Eagle Scout in 1967. He is a recipient of the Distinguished Eagle Scout Award and the Silver Buffalo Award and has been involved in Sea Scouting. From October 2008 to May 2019 he served as National Sea Scout Commodore.
