= Morning Dew (disambiguation) =

"Morning Dew" is a song written by Bonnie Dobson.

Morning dew is droplets of condensed moisture that may appear on outdoor objects in the morning.

Morning Dew may also refer to:

== Music ==
- The Morning Dew, an American rock band from Kansas
- "Morning Dew" (Korean song), a 1970s Korean protest song
- "Morning Dew", an instrumental by Schiller from the album Tag und Nacht
- "Morning Dew (Donk)", a song by Beyoncé

== Other uses ==
- Morning Dew (shipwreck), a pleasure craft which sank in 1997 in the USA
