= Eric E. Fiel =

United States Air Force general

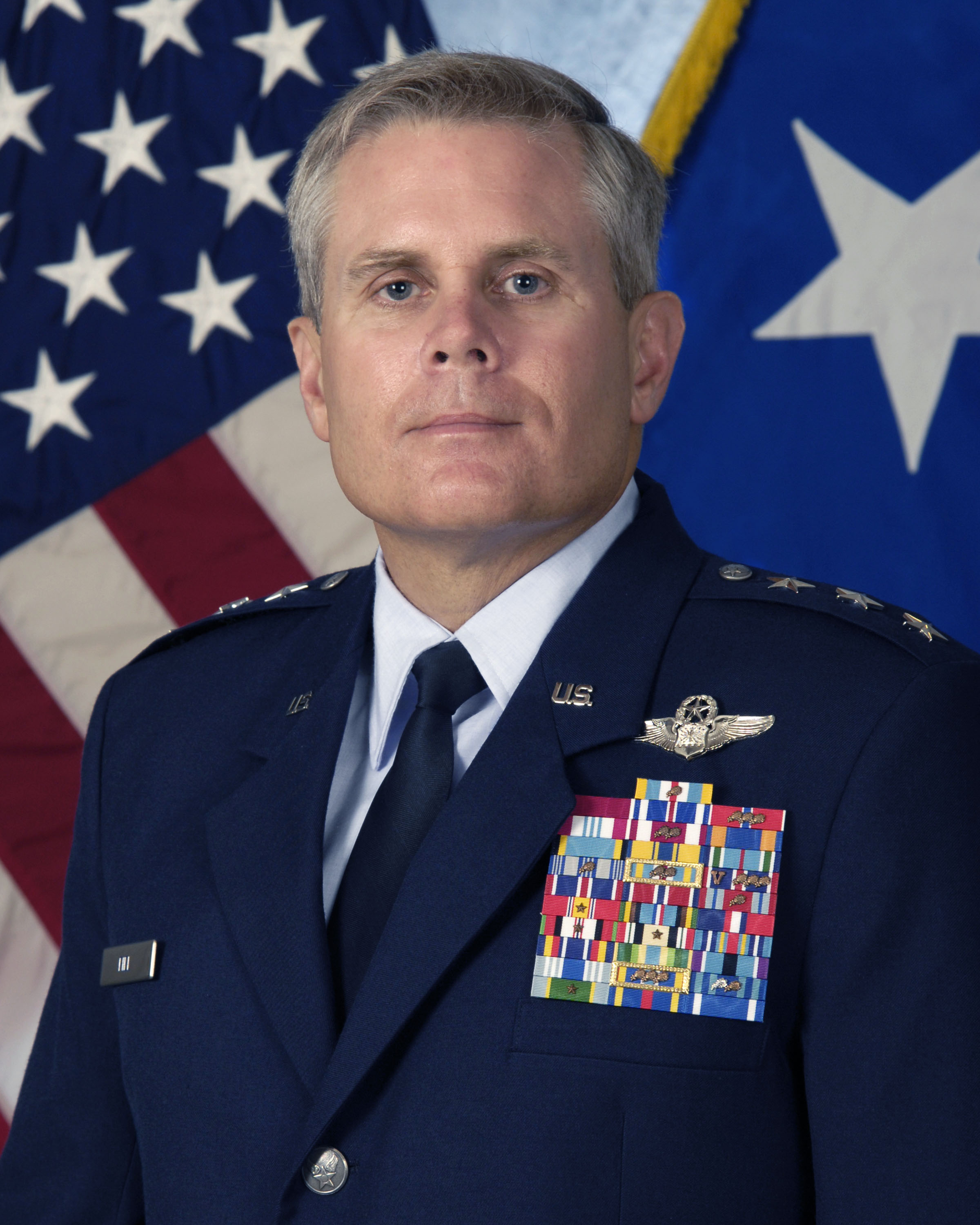
- General Eric E. Fiel in 2011
- Military career
- Allegiance: United States
- Branch: United States Air Force
- Service years: 1981–2014
- Rank: Lieutenant General
- Commands: Air Force Special Operations Command; 58th Special Operations Wing
- Conflicts: Operation Deliberate Force; Operation Noble Anvil; War in Afghanistan; Iraq War
- Awards: Defense Superior Service Medal (3); Legion of Merit; Distinguished Flying Cross; Bronze Star Medal (4)

Lieutenant General Eric E. Fiel is a retired United States Air Force officer who served as commander of Air Force Special Operations Command from 2011 to 2014. The command is the Air Force component of United States Special Operations Command. AFSOC provides Air Force special operations forces for worldwide deployment and assignment to unified combatant commanders. The command has approximately 16,000 active-duty, Reserve, Air National Guard and civilian professionals.

== Air Force career ==
Fiel entered the United States Air Force in 1981 as a graduate of Officer Training School. He has held a variety of assignments and has commanded at the squadron, group and wing levels. Additionally, he has held a variety of staff positions at major command, unified command, Air Staff and Secretary of the Air Force levels. Prior to his current assignment, he was the Vice Commander, Headquarters United States Special Operations Command, Pentagon, Washington, D.C.

Fiel has significant experience in combat and leadership positions in major joint contingency operations. He commanded a special operations squadron during Operation Deliberate Force in Bosnia and Operation Noble Anvil in Kosovo operations. From September 2001 to March 2003, he was forward-deployed as the Joint Special Operations Air Component commander in Operation Enduring Freedom. From May 2006 to April 2008, he was forward-deployed as a task force commander multiple times for operations Enduring Freedom and Operation Iraqi Freedom. On January 26, 2011, Fiel was nominated by the Pentagon to replace Donald Wurster as the commander of Air Force Special Operations Command.

=== AFSOC commander ===
On June 24, 2011, Fiel took over Air Force Special Operations Command from Lieutenant General Donald C. Wurster in a ceremony held at Hurlburt Field. Air Force Chief of Staff Gen. Norton Schwartz presided over the ceremony.

After Fiel assumed command he initiated a re-assessment of AFSOCs combat priorities. As a result, various changes were instituted, including a re-missioning of the MC-130W as the AC-130W gunship for increased capabilities in precision airstrike support, the 24th Special Operations Wing was stood up composed entirely of Special Tactics Squadrons as well as their training squadron. The Special Tactics Squadrons are made up of Special Tactics Officers, Combat Controllers, Combat Rescue Officers, Pararescuemen, Special Operations Weather Officers and Airmen, Air Liaison Officers, Tactical Air Control Party operators, and a number of combat support airmen which comprise 58 Air Force specialties.

== Education ==
- 1980 Bachelor of Science degree in management, University at Buffalo, New York
- 1984 Squadron Officer School, Maxwell AFB, Alabama
- 1989 Master's degree in management, Troy State University
- 1992 Army Command and General Staff College, Fort Leavenworth, Kansas
- 1992 Armed Forces Staff College, Norfolk, Virginia
- 2001 Master's degree in strategic studies, Air War College, Maxwell AFB, Alabama
- 2005 National Security Management Course, Syracuse University, New York
- 2008 Navy Senior Leader Business Course, Kenan-Flagler Business School, University of North Carolina at Chapel Hill

== Assignments ==
- July 1981 – July 1982, student, undergraduate navigator training and electronic warfare officer training, 323rd Flying Training Wing, Mather AFB, California
- August 1982 – July 1984, MC-130E EWO instructor and executive officer, 8th Special Operations Squadron, Hurlburt Field, Florida
- August 1984 – July 1985, standardization and evaluation EWO, 1st Special Operations Wing, Hurlburt Field, Florida
- August 1985 – August 1986, executive officer, 1st Special Operations Wing, Hurlburt Field, Florida
- September 1986 – September 1987, Air Staff Training Program, Office of the Assistant Secretary of the Air Force for Acquisition, Washington, D.C.
- September 1987 – September 1988, chief of MC-130E Standardization and Evaluation, Headquarters 23rd Air Force, Hurlburt Field, Florida
- September 1988 – September 1989, chief of Electronic Combat Division, Headquarters 23rd Air Force, Hurlburt Field, Florida
- September 1989 – February 1990, executive officer to the Vice Commander, 23rd Air Force, Hurlburt Field, Florida
- February 1990 – May 1991, aide-de-camp to the commander of Air Force Special Operations Command, Hurlburt Field, Florida
- June 1991 – June 1992, student, Army Command and General Staff College, Fort Leavenworth, Kansas
- June 1992 – September 1992, student, Armed Forces Staff College, Norfolk, Virginia
- September 1992 – April 1994, chief of North Asia Air Defense Division, Joint Intelligence Center Pacific, Pearl Harbor, Hawaii
- April 1994 – August 1995, chief of Crisis Management Division, Joint Intelligence Center Pacific, Pearl Harbor, Hawaii
- September 1995 – January 1997, director of operations, 18th Flight Test Squadron, Hurlburt Field, Florida
- February 1997 – September 1999, assistant director of operations, director of operations and commander of 4th Special Operations Squadron, Hurlburt Field, Florida
- September 1999 – July 2000, deputy commander of 16th Operations Group, Hurlburt Field, Florida
- August 2000 – June 2001, student, Air War College, Maxwell AFB, Alabama
- July 2001 – April 2003, commander of Aviation Tactics Evaluation Group, Fort Bragg, North Carolina
- April 2003 – May 2005, commander of 58th Special Operations Wing, Kirtland AFB, New Mexico
- June 2005 – December 2005, director of operations, Air Force Special Operations Command, Hurlburt Field, Florida
- December 2005 – April 2006, commander of Air Force Special Operations Forces, Hurlburt Field, Florida
- April 2006 – April 2008, deputy commanding general of Joint Special Operations Command, Fort Bragg, North Carolina
- May 2008 – September 2009, director of Center for Force Structure, Requirements, Resources and Strategic Assessments, Headquarters U.S. Special Operations Command, MacDill AFB, Florida
- October 2009 – June 2010, chief of staff, Headquarters U.S. Special Operations Command, MacDill AFB, Florida
- June 2010 – June 2011, vice commander, Headquarters U.S. Special Operations Command, Washington, D.C.
- June 2011 – July 2014, commander of Air Force Special Operations Command, Hurlburt Field, Florida

== Flight information ==
- Rating: Master navigator
- Flight hours: More than 2,000
- Aircraft flown: T-43, T-37, MC-130E/H and AC-130A/H/U

== Decorations and badges ==
Master Navigator Badge

Defense Superior Service Medal with two bronze oak leaf clusters
Legion of Merit
Distinguished Flying Cross
Bronze Star with three oak leaf clusters
Defense Meritorious Service Medal
Meritorious Service Medal with two oak leaf clusters
Air Medal
Aerial Achievement Medal
Air Force Commendation Medal
Joint Service Achievement Medal
Air Force Achievement Medal with oak leaf cluster
Joint Meritorious Unit Award with two oak leaf clusters
Outstanding Unit Award with Valor device and three oak leaf clusters
Outstanding Unit Award (second ribbon to denote fifth award)
Organizational Excellence Award
Combat Readiness Medal with oak leaf cluster
National Defense Service Medal with one bronze service star
Armed Forces Expeditionary Medal
Kosovo Campaign Medal
Afghanistan Campaign Medal with one service star
Iraq Campaign Medal with one service star
Global War on Terrorism Expeditionary Medal
Global War on Terrorism Service Medal
Armed Forces Service Medal
Humanitarian Service Medal
Air Force Overseas Long Tour Service Ribbon
Air Force Expeditionary Service Ribbon with gold frame and three oak leaf clusters
Air Force Longevity Service Award with silver and two bronze oak leaf clusters
Small Arms Expert Marksmanship Ribbon with one bronze service star
Air Force Training Ribbon
NATO Medal (Former Republic of Yugoslavia)

== Promotion dates ==
- Second Lieutenant July 15, 1981
- First Lieutenant July 15, 1983
- Captain July 15, 1985
- Major October 1, 1991
- Lieutenant Colonel December 1, 1996
- Colonel March 1, 2001
- Brigadier General Nov. 2, 2006
- Major General Dec. 3, 2009
- Lieutenant General June 11, 2010

Military offices
Preceded by Donald C. Wurster	Commander, Air Force Special Operations Command; 2011–2014	Succeeded by Bradley Heithold
