= R. W. Beck, Inc. =

Design engineering company

- Company type: Private, employee-shareholder owned
- Industry: Technically based business consultants to the energy, financial, solid waste and water/wastewater industries
- Founded: 1942
- Founder: Robert W. Beck
- Successor: Science Applications International Corporation foundation = Columbus, Nebraska (1942)
- Headquarters: Seattle, Washington (Corporate Office)
- Revenue: ▲US$102M (2007)
- Number of employees: 650 (2008)
- Website: www.rwbeck.com

R. W. Beck, Inc. was a design engineering company focused primarily on public and private infrastructure organizations.

The company, though founded in Nebraska, was most recently based in Seattle. It also had offices in several US states and in Singapore. R.W. Beck Inc. is now part of Leidos.

== History ==
R.W. Beck Inc. was founded in 1942 by Robert W. Beck in Columbus, Nebraska. He was a founding member of the American Public Power Association (APPA).

In 1954 the company became a partnership, R.W. Beck & Associates, diversifying into new private markets with hydroelectric projects and electrical design and construction management. During 1957, R.W. Beck & Associates helped form the nation’s first Joint Action Agency, Washington Public Power Supply System (now Energy Northwest). Water and wastewater management services were added in the 1960s and solid waste services in the 1970s. The firm incorporated in 1996 becoming R.W. Beck, Inc., a privately held corporation.

R.W. Beck Inc. served public and private infrastructure organizations and financiers in the energy, water, wastewater, and solid waste industries. At its peak in the early 2000s, the company employed as many as 650 engineers, economists, analysts, scientists, and other professionals. R.W. Beck's customers included utility organizations, municipalities and other government entities, financial institutions, and private developers and investors. A subsidiary of R.W. Beck Inc., Beck Disaster Recovery Inc. (BDR), provided emergency management consultancies in hazards mitigation, preparedness/planning, response, recovery and reconstruction services; continuity and emergency operations planning; risk management and mitigation; and training services to local and state government agencies nationwide.

R.W. Beck Inc. had approximately sixteen offices in the United States, including key offices in Boston, Denver, Seattle, Orlando, and Nashville; and in 2004, R.W. Beck Inc. established a Singapore office.

In 2007, R.W. Beck Inc. acquired Plexus Research, Inc. a Boxborough, Massachusetts-based technology and management consulting firm that provided utility industry consulting services in the technologies, applications, and economics of advanced energy systems. Plexus specialized in the areas of Advanced Metering Infrastructure (AMI) and Automatic Meter Reading (AMR) applications. In 2007, R.W. Beck Inc. acquired Barnes & Click, Inc., a Plano, Texas-based firm that provided consulting services to the hydrocarbon processing industries, including petroleum refining, gas midstream, and petrochemical sectors.

In July 2009, Science Applications International Corporation (SAIC) acquired R.W. Beck, Inc.; and in 2011, R.W. Beck Inc. became part of SAIC's Energy, Environment, & Infrastructure LLC (SEE&I) Division, which is now Leidos Engineering LLC.
