= TeraText =

Text database

- Developer(s): Leidos
- Stable release: 7.1.0 / 29 Jul 2020
- Operating system: Cross-platform
- Type: DBS
- License: Per CPU
- Website: www.teratext.com

TeraText is a non-relational text database. It is used to store and search through large amounts of textual data. It was originally developed at Royal Melbourne Institute of Technology.

TeraText operation utilises a heavy client server model. A basic setup can consist of a Content Server (CS), Administration Interface, Application Server (AS), Security Server (SLS) and a Boot Server (boots).

Individual servers communicate with each other using the standard Z39.50 protocol. Administration is through the HTTP interface.
