= Morning Dew (shipwreck) =

American sailboat accident in 1997

Coordinates: 32.741°N 79.832°W

Morning Dew was a 34-foot (10 m) recreational sailboat that sank on the morning of December 29, 1997, off South Carolina, United States. The captain and all three passengers died in the accident. As a result of the investigation, the Coast Guard made significant changes to technology and protocols.

== History ==
Morning Dew was a Cal 34 class sailboat built by Cal Boats in 1978. The ship had been owned by several different owners, before being purchased by Michael Cornett in 1997. Cornett planned to move the boat from Little River (near Myrtle Beach) to Jacksonville, FL.

== December 29, 1997 ==
Early on the morning of December 29, the Morning Dew struck the rock jetty at the north side of the shipping channel into Charleston Harbor. Cornett was operating the vessel alone on deck, while 3 teenage passengers were below.

The youngest passenger radioed for help at 1:55 am, but the mayday call was missed because the watchstander had stepped away to refill his coffee. After a second brief radio transmission, the watchstander repeated attempts to contact the unknown ship, but was unsuccessful. The Coast Guard did not dispatch rescue units until 11 am.

== Aftermath ==
In the investigation that followed, the NTSB determined that the search and rescue response by the United States Coast Guard was inadequate, and made a series of recommendations. These led to the program upgrading the National Distress System to the more modern Rescue 21 system, as well as improved watchstander training and staffing.

The victim's families sued the Coast Guard, and in 2001 a Federal judge awarded them $19 million.
