= Rescue 21 =

Maritime communications system

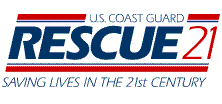
Rescue 21 Logo.

Rescue 21 is an advanced maritime computing, command, control, and communications (C4) system designed to manage communications for the United States Coast Guard.

== Overview ==
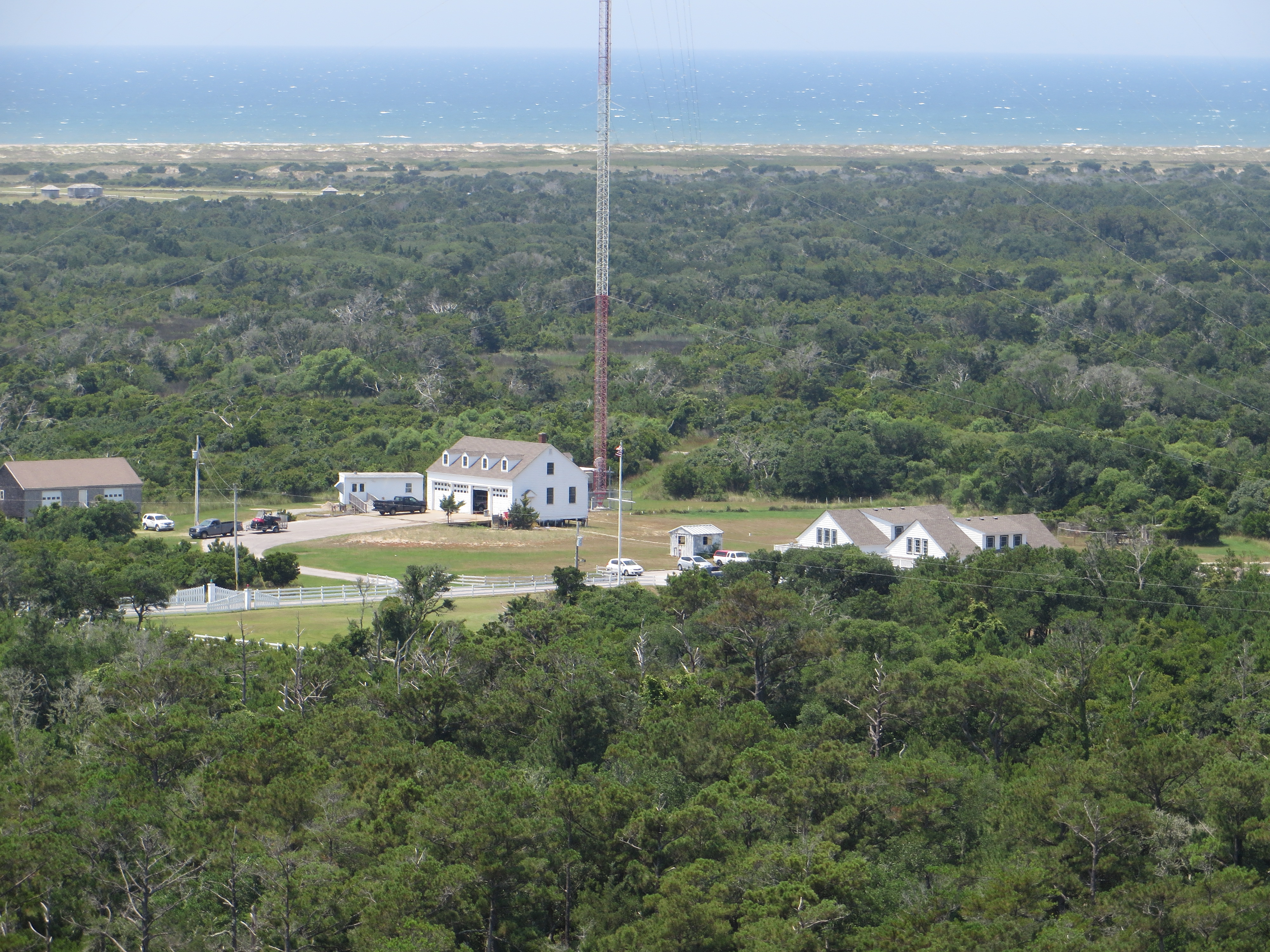
USCG Rescue 21 antenna tower at Cape Hatteras National Seashore

Rescue 21 is designed to be more robust, reliable, and capable than the legacy system by using a modern radio system coupled with a TCP/IP network, and digital communication using VoIP. It was created to better locate mariners in distress and save lives and property at sea and on navigable rivers.

To address the limitations of the current communications system, the National Distress and Response System (NDRS), the Coast Guard has implemented a major systems acquisition program entitled Rescue 21.

Rescue 21 enables the Coast Guard to perform all missions with greater agility and efficiency. The new system will close 88 known coverage gaps in coastal areas of the United States, enhancing the safety of life at sea. The system's expanded system frequency capacity enables greater coordination with the Department of Homeland Security, as well as other federal, state and local agencies, and first responders.

When completed, this vital major systems acquisition will provide an updated, leading-edge Very High Frequency – Frequency Modulated (VHF-FM) communications system, replacing the National Distress Response System installed and deployed during the 1970s. Rescue 21 will cover more than 95,000 miles (153,000 km) of coastline, navigable rivers and waterways in the continental United States, Alaska, Hawaii, Guam, and Puerto Rico. Remote sites in Alaska and along the Western Rivers are scheduled to receive modified Rescue 21 coverage by 2017. By replacing outdated legacy technology with a fully integrated system, Rescue 21 provides the Coast Guard with upgraded tools and technology to protect the nation's coasts and rescue mariners at sea. The name Rescue 21 is a reference to taking the Search out of Search and Rescue.

Rescue 21 was designed and is supported by General Dynamics Mission Systems out of Scottsdale, Arizona.

== NDRS Technology ==
The National Distress and Response System (NDRS) was established more than 30 years ago as a VHF-FM-based radio communication system that has a range of up to 20 nautical miles (37 km) along most of the U.S. shoreline. While this system has served the Coast Guard well over the years, it consists of out-of-date and non-standard equipment with many limitations. These include:

- No direction finding capability.
- Numerous geographic communication coverage gaps.
- Limited interoperability with other emergency response services.
- Single-channel radio operation, which prohibits the ability to receive multiple radio calls.

== Rescue 21 technology ==
Rescue 21 will provide the United States with a 21st-century maritime command, control, and communications (C3) system that encompasses the entire United States. By replacing outdated technology with a fully integrated C3 system, Rescue 21 improves on the NDRS with the following enhancements: interoperability, direction-finding equipment with 2 degrees Root Mean Square of accuracy, enhanced clarity of distress calls, simultaneous channel monitoring, upgraded playback and recording feature for distress calls, reduced coverage gaps, and supporting Digital Selective Calling (DSC).

== Features ==
- Improved information sharing and coordination with the Department of Homeland Security and federal, state and local first responders
- Geographic display to assist in identifying hoax callers, conserving valuable response resources
- Supports Digital Selective Calling (DSC), which allows mariners in distress with DSC-equipped radios to transmit, at the push of a button, their exact GPS position and vital vessel information to the Coast Guard and other DSC-equipped vessels
- Enhances clarity and provides recording and playback capabilities for all communications
- Simultaneous monitoring and relaying of information over multiple radio frequencies
- Provides portable tower communications during emergencies and natural disasters
- Automates transmission of urgent marine information broadcasts

== Timeline ==
High-level history and timeline of the Rescue 21 program:

- 1970s - National Distress System (legacy system) is installed to receive and respond to VHF distress calls.
- 1994 May - The Mission Analysis Report is completed. This document states the needed requirements and capability gaps of the legacy coastal communications system.
- 1995 July - The Mission Need Statement is approved. The approval of this document provides formal acknowledgement that a materiel solution is required to address the capability gaps.
- 1995 July - The acquisition project is chartered as the National Distress and Response System Modernization Program (NDRSMP).
- 1997 December - Morning Dew accident validates the need for a new VHF-FM system for the Coast Guard.
- 2000 August - Phase I contract awards to SAIC, Lockheed Martin, and Motorola.
- 2001 January - General Dynamics buys Motorola.
- 2001 November - Phase I contractors demonstrate that their designs meet critical functions.
- 2002 September - General Dynamics awarded Phase II contract.
- 2002 September - NDRSMP changed to Rescue 21.
- 2003 March - Work started at Group Atlantic City NJ.
- 2005 August - Project Resident Office stood up in Scottsdale, Arizona.
- 2005 September - The Disaster Recovery System is deployed to Louisiana in response to Hurricane Katrina.
- 2005 November - First rescue attributed to Rescue 21 from Group Eastern Shore, VA.
- 2005 December - Coast Guard accepts the Rescue 21 system at New Jersey and Eastern Shore, Virginia.
- 2006 May - Sector Mobile Alabama accepts system.
- 2006 June - Sector St. Petersburg Florida accepts system.
- 2006 December - Sectors Seattle and Port Angeles, WA accept system.
- 2007 August - Project Resident Office stood up in Juneau, Alaska.
- 2007 April - Sector New Orleans Louisiana (PHASE I) accepts system.
- 2007 September - Sector Delaware Bay accepts system.
- 2007 October - Sector Long Island Sound New York accepts system.
- 2007 November - Sector New York New York accepts system.
- 2008 January - Coast Guard accepts the Rescue 21 system at Staten Island, New York.
- 2008 February - Coast Guard accepts the Rescue 21 system at Jacksonville, Florida.
- 2008 February - Sector Hampton Roads accepts the Rescue 21 system at Hampton Roads, Virginia
- 2008 March - Sector Miami accepts the Rescue 21 system in Miami, Florida.
- 2008 April - Group Astoria accepts Rescue 21 in Astoria, Oregon.
- 2008 May - Sector Baltimore accepts Rescue 21 in Baltimore, Maryland.
- 2008 June - Group/Air Station North Bend accepts Rescue 21 in North Bend, Oregon.
- 2008 July - Sector Portland accepts Rescue 21 in Portland, Oregon.
- 2008 July - The Alaska Implementation requirements for coverage areas and site functionality were approved.
- 2008 August - Sector New Orleans Louisiana (PHASE II) accepts system.
- 2008 September - Sector Key West Florida accepts system.
- 2008 October - Sector Houston-Galveston Texas officially accepts system.
- 2008 December - Sector Charleston South Carolina officially accepts system.
- 2009 March - Sector North Carolina.
- 2009 April - Sector Boston.
- 2009 September - Group/Air Station Humboldt Bay.
- 2009 October - Sector Southeastern New England.
- 2009 November - Sector Northern New England.
- 2009 December - Sector Corpus Christi.
- 2010 March - Sector San Francisco.
- 2010 April - Sector San Diego.
- 2010 October - Sector Detroit.
- 2010 December - Sector Los Angeles/Long Beach.
- 2012 March - Sector Honolulu.
- 2012 August - Sector Buffalo, Sector Sault Ste.Marie.
- 2012 October - Sector Lake Michigan.
- 2012 December - Sector San Juan.

As of 2012 Rescue 21 covers 42,000 miles (68,000 km) of coastline.
