= John Robert Beyster =

American scientist and entrepreneur

- Born: July 26, 1924; Detroit, Michigan, U.S.
- Died: December 22, 2014 (aged 90); La Jolla, California, U.S.
- Education: University of Michigan
- Occupations: Scientist, entrepreneur
- Spouse: Betty Beyster
- Website: www.beyster.com

John Robert Beyster (July 26, 1924 – December 22, 2014), often styled J. Robert Beyster, was an American scientist and entrepreneur, and the founder of Science Applications International Corporation. He was chairman until his retirement in July 2004, and chief executive officer (CEO) until November 2003. Beyster's primary areas of interest were national security and nuclear reactor physics. Beyster also founded two nonprofit organizations to assist organizations considering employee ownership: the Beyster Institute and the Foundation for Enterprise Development.

== Biography ==
=== Early life and work ===
Beyster was born in Detroit, Michigan, in 1924, and grew up in Grosse Ile, Michigan. He attended school at Slocum Truax High School in Trenton, Michigan, and was salutatorian of his graduating class. As he was preparing to graduate from high school, the United States entered World War II, and he enlisted in the U.S. Navy. He was sent to college at the University of Michigan, where he was enrolled in the V12 Officer Training Program. He was commissioned as an ensign, and eventually served on a destroyer based in Norfolk, Virginia before leaving six months later. Educated at the University of Michigan (COE: BSE, MS, PhD), Beyster worked as a scientist for Westinghouse Atomic Power Division on the company's nuclear submarine program in the 1950s. He soon followed many of his college associates to New Mexico to work as a research physicist at the Los Alamos National Laboratory. In 1957 he became the chairman of the Accelerator Physics Department of General Atomics where he remained until it was bought by Gulf Oil in 1968.

=== Career at SAIC ===
In 1969, Beyster raised money to start Science Applications, Inc. (SAI) by investing the proceeds from selling stock he had received from General Atomic, combined with funds raised from early employees of the company. The company was renamed Science Applications International Corporation (SAIC) as it expanded its operations.

Initially the company's focus was on projects for the U.S. government related to nuclear power and weapons effects study programs. Contrary to traditional business models, SAIC was set up so that ownership of the company and profits belonged to the company's employees. In 2012, SAIC split into two companies, one retaining the original name, and the other (known as Leidos) which performs projects for commercial and government customers related to information technology, systems integration and eSolutions, national and homeland security, energy, the environment, space, telecommunications, health care, and logistics. When Beyster retired as Chairman of SAIC on July 16, 2004, the company had annual revenues of $6.7 billion and more than 43,000 employees.

=== Other work and contributions ===
Beyster founded the Foundation for Enterprise Development in 1986 "to help develop successful enterprises in the U.S. and around the world" by focusing on "advancing entrepreneurship and employee ownership through its work with technologists, entrepreneurs, executives, governments, and educators." In 2004, the Foundation launched the Beyster Institute, which is "dedicated to training, education, and consulting in employee ownership and entrepreneurship."

Beyster wrote or co-authored approximately 60 publications and reports, as well as the books The SAIC Solution: How We Built an $8 Billion Employee-Owned Technology Company, published by John Wiley & Sons in 2007, and Names, Numbers, and Network Solutions: The Monetization of the Internet, cowritten with Michael A. Daniels and published in 2013. A fellow of the American Nuclear Society, Beyster was whairman of its Reactor Physics Division and Shielding Division. He was a fellow of the American Physical Society, a member of the Scientific Advisory Group to the Director, Strategic Target Planning Staff of the Joint Chiefs of Staff, and a member of the National Academy of Engineering. He also was chairman emeritus of the University of California, San Diego Foundation.

=== Death ===
Beyster died at his home in La Jolla, California on December 22, 2014.

== Personal life ==
A former naval officer, Beyster enjoyed sailing and was the owner of Solutions, a Hinckley motor yacht. While Beyster was still at SAIC, the company backed and provided design technology to a number of U.S. entries in the America's Cup race.

John Robert Beyster and Betty Beyster married at St. Alban's Church in Austin, Texas in 1955, and had three children.

== Awards and distinctions ==
The Defense Advanced Research Project Agency designated Beyster an Honorary Program Manager "for his distinguished contributions to the agency over his career." He also received the Engineering Manager of the Year Award in 2000 from the American Society of Engineering Management, the 2001 Spirit of San Diego Award from the San Diego Regional Chamber of Commerce, the Lifetime Achievement Award from Ernst & Young in 2003, and the "Supporter of Entrepreneurialism" award from Arthur Young and Venture magazine.

In 2006, the San Diego Regional Economic Development Corporation (EDC) recognized Beyster with the Herb Klein Civic Leadership Award "for his outstanding leadership in addressing regional challenges through collaboration with public, private, and civic partners." Beyster is the recipient of a lifetime achievement award from CONNECT program of the University of California, San Diego's "for providing 25 years of outstanding service to the community." The Horatio Alger Association for Distinguished Americans selected Beyster to be a 2008 Horatio Alger Award recipient.

In 2008, Beyster was inducted into the International Air & Space Hall of Fame at the San Diego Air & Space Museum.

On Wednesday, April 11, 2012, the computer science and engineering building at the University of Michigan was rededicated in his and his wife's name as the Bob and Betty Beyster Building (BBB).

In 2019, RV Bob and Betty Beyster, a 42-foot research vessel that bears their names, joined the fleet at the Scripps Institution of Oceanography.

The Bob and Betty Beyster garden sits at the entrance to the Sulpizio Center at UCSD Thorton Medical Center on campus across the street from former SAIC headquarters.
