= Kiest Park =

- Location within Texas Location within the United States
- Location: Dallas, Texas, US
- Coordinates: 32.710°N 96.853°W
- Area: 263 acres (106 ha)
- Established: 1931
- Founder: Edwin John Kiest
- Etymology: Named for Elizabeth Kiest

Kiest Park is a 263-acre (106 ha) park in southern Dallas, Texas, United States, established in 1931 by Edwin John Kiest, publisher of the Dallas Times Herald and a member of the Dallas Park Board in the 1930s who donated the land for the park. Named in memory of Kiest's late wife, artist Elizabeth Patterson Kiest, it is the largest City of Dallas Park in Oak Cliff and features hike-and-bike trails, tennis courts, baseball diamonds, playgrounds, picnic tables and several Works Progress Administration-era structures, including stone gates at three entrances to the park, a stone picnic shelter and a stone field house. The WPA also built a formal garden at the heart of Kiest Park. A pergola was built at the head of the garden in 1934 with WPA funds but fell into ruin and was cleared away. The nonprofit organization Friends of Oak Cliff Parks restored the historic garden and the City of Dallas rebuilt the pergola in 2014 based on the original plans, using $2 million in bond funds.

In 2017, the nonprofit Texas Recreation and Park Society named Kiest Park a Lone Star Legacy Park, which marks it as “a park that holds special prominence in the local community and the State of Texas.” The same year, the park became the site of Spanish artist Casto Solano's sculpture honoring Oak Cliff natives Stevie Ray Vaughan and Jimmie Vaughan. The Vaughan family home was located at 2557 Glenfield Avenue, one-half mile away.

== Boundaries and accessibility ==
The park is bounded by Perryton Dr to the north, Rugged Dr to the east, W Kiest Blvd to the south and S Hampton Rd to the west. It is connected by trail to Elmwood Parkway to the north, and plans exist to extend that trail to Tyler/Vernon_station through Elmwood, Dallas.
