= Donald C. Wurster =

United States Air Force general

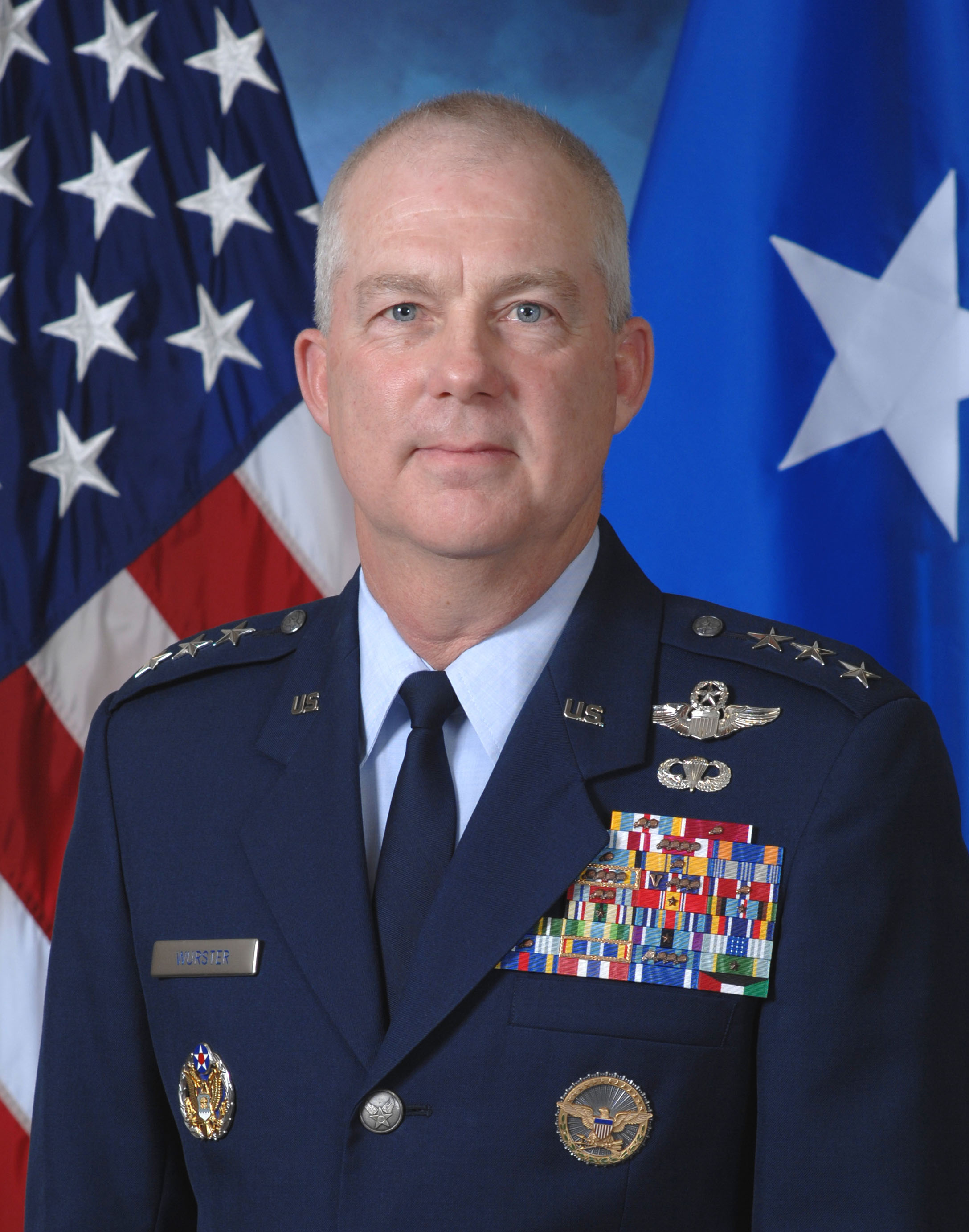
- Lieutenant General Donald C. Wurster
- Born: Washington, D.C.
- Military career
- Allegiance: United States
- Branch: United States Air Force
- Service years: 1973–2011
- Rank: Lieutenant General
- Nickname: Donny
- Commands: Air Force Special Operations Command; Special Operations Command Pacific; 16th Special Operations Wing; 16th Operations Group; 21st Special Operations Squadron
- Conflicts: Gulf War; Filipino Insurgency
- Awards: Air Force Distinguished Service Medal; Defense Superior Service Medal (3); Legion of Merit (2)

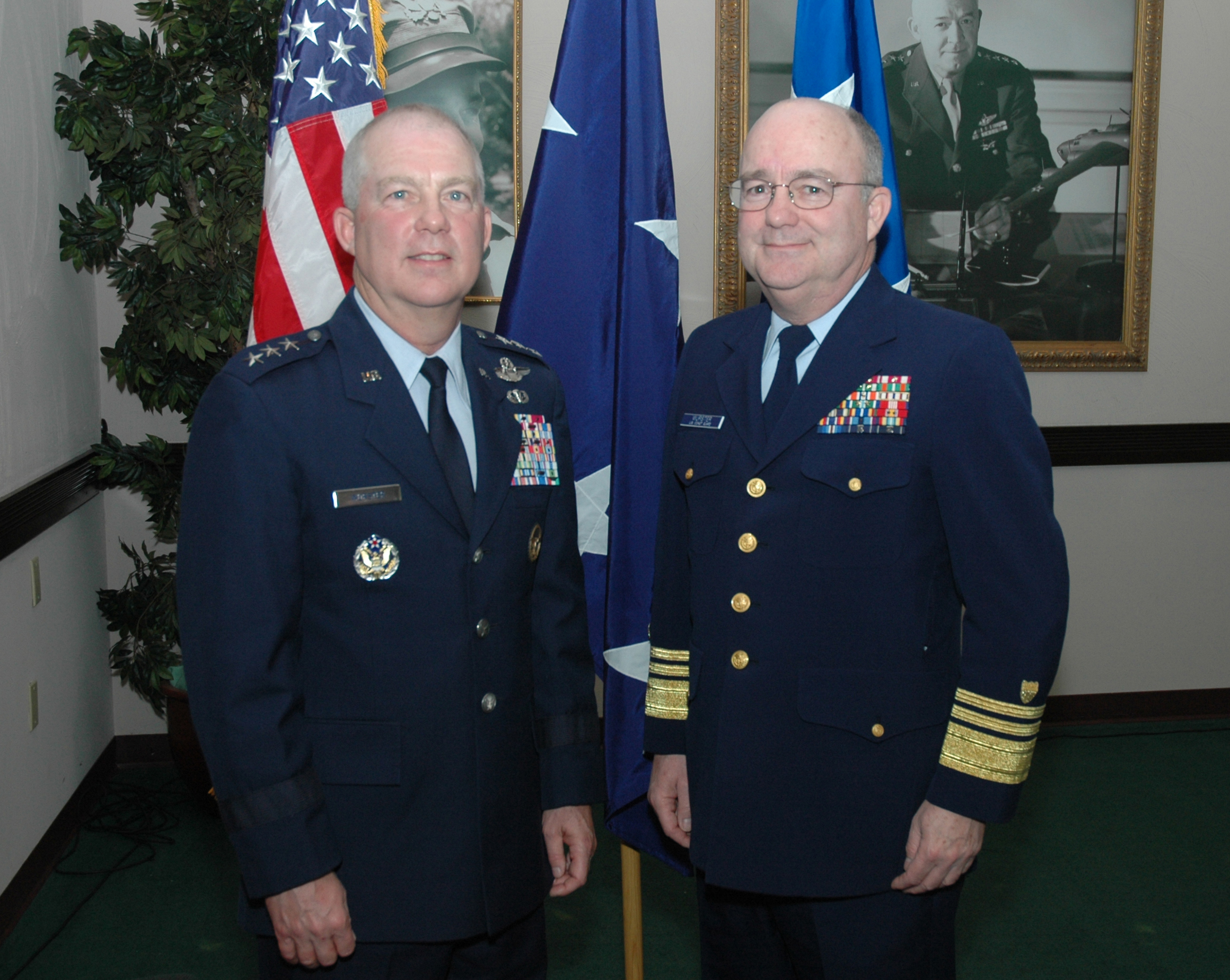
Lt. Gen. Donny Wurster (left), Air Force Special Operations Command commander, and Vice Adm. Charles Wurster (right), U.S. Coast Guard Pacific Area commander

Lieutenant General Donald C. Wurster is a retired United States Air Force officer who served as Commander, Air Force Special Operations Command (AFSOC). The command is a major command of the United States Air Force and the Air Force component of United States Special Operations Command. AFSOC provides Air Force Special Operations Forces for worldwide deployment and assignment to unified combatant commanders. The command has approximately 12,900 active-duty, Reserve, Air National Guard and civilian professionals.

== Military career ==
Born in Washington, D.C., Wurster was commissioned in 1973 upon graduation from the United States Air Force Academy. In 1974, he completed undergraduate helicopter training at Fort Rucker, Alabama. Wurster commanded special operations forces at the squadron, group, wing and subunified command level, and he served as commander of all United States forces assigned to Joint Task Force-510 during Operation Enduring Freedom – Philippines. Wurster was deputy director, Center for Special Operations, United States Special Operations Command, from May 2004 to February 2006.

Wurster is a command pilot with more than 4,000 flying hours, including assignments in both rescue and special operations.

His brother, Charles D. Wurster, retired in 2008 as a vice admiral in the United States Coast Guard. The Wurster family has a record of military service dating back to the Revolutionary War. As three-star flag officers, the brothers hold the highest rank of anyone in their family. Their father, retired USAF Colonel Charles Wurster, was a F-51 and F-80 (P-80) pilot with the 36th Fighter Squadron in the Korean War and became one of only three pilots to score more than one "kill" in all of 1950.

== Education ==
- 1973 Bachelor of Science degree, U.S. Air Force Academy, Colorado Springs, Colo.
- 1982 Distinguished graduate, Squadron Officer School, Maxwell AFB, Ala.
- 1983 Master of Arts degree, Webster University, St. Louis, Mo.
- 1987 Distinguished graduate, Air Command and Staff College, Maxwell AFB, Ala.
- 1994 Air War College, by correspondence
- 1997 Industrial College of the Armed Forces, Fort Lesley J. McNair, Washington, D.C.
- 2004 National Security Leadership Course, Syracuse New York
- 2009 Leadership at the Peak, Center for Creative Leadership, Colorado Springs, Colorado

== Assignments ==
1. June 1973 – July 1974, student, undergraduate helicopter training, Fort Rucker, Ala.
2. July 1974 – March 1975, student, HH-3E Jolly Green Giant training, Hill AFB, Utah
3. March 1975 – May 1976, HH-3E pilot, Detachment 13, 41st Rescue and Weather Reconnaissance Wing, Osan Air Base, South Korea
4. May 1976 – July 1979, HH-3E instructor pilot, 71st Air Rescue and Recovery Squadron, Elmendorf AFB, Alaska
5. July 1979 – November 1980, inactive Air Force Reserve, Lowry AFB, Colo.
6. November 1980 – December 1983, HH-3E evaluator pilot, 1550th Aircrew Training and Test Wing, Kirtland AFB, N.M.
7. December 1983 – July 1986, weapon systems program manager for rescue and special operations forces, Aircraft Acquisition Branch, Headquarters Military Airlift Command, Scott AFB, Ill.
8. July 1986 – June 1987, student, Air Command and Staff College, Maxwell AFB, Ala.
9. June 1987 – July 1989, MH-60G Pave Hawk assistant operations officer, 55th Special Operations Squadron, Eglin AFB, Fla.
10. July 1989 – August 1991, program element monitor for rescue and special operations forces, Office of the Secretary of the Air Force for Acquisition, Headquarters U.S. Air Force, Washington, D.C.
11. August 1991 – July 1994, operations officer, then MH-53J Pave Low IIIE commander, 21st Special Operations Squadron, Royal Air Force Woodbridge and Royal Air Force Alconbury, England
12. July 1994 – July 1996, assistant for electronics, communications and special programs, Office of the Assistant Secretary of Defense for Special Operations and Low-Intensity Conflict, Forces and Resources, Washington, D.C.
13. July 1996 – July 1997, student, Industrial College of the Armed Forces, Fort Lesley J. McNair, Washington, D.C.
14. July 1997 – September 1997, MH-53J requalification, 551st Flying Training Squadron, Kirtland AFB, N.M.
15. September 1997 – June 1998, Commander, 16th Operations Group, Hurlburt Field, Fla.
16. June 1998 – July 1999, Commander, 16th Special Operations Wing, Hurlburt Field, Fla.
17. October 1999 – October 2000, Inspector General, U.S. Transportation Command and Headquarters Air Mobility Command, Scott AFB, Ill.
18. October 2000 – February 2003, Commander, Special Operations Command, Pacific, Camp H.M. Smith, Hawaii
19. February 2003 – May 2004, special assistant to the Commander, U.S. Special Operations Command, later, Director, Center for Intelligence and Information Operations, USSOCOM, MacDill AFB, Fla.
20. May 2004 – February 2006, deputy director, Center for Special Operations, USSOCOM, MacDill AFB, Fla.
21. February 2006 – November 2007, Vice Commander, Air Force Special Operations Command, Hurlburt Field, Fla.
22. November 2007 – June 2011, Commander, Air Force Special Operations Command, Hurlburt Field, Fla.

== Flight Information ==
- Rating: Command pilot
- Flight hours: More than 4,000
- Aircraft flown: AC-130, HH-3E, MC-130, MH-53J, MH-60G, and CV-22 Osprey, PZL M28 & U-28

== Awards and decorations ==
US Air Force Command Pilot Badge
Basic Parachutist Badge
Office of the Secretary of Defense Identification Badge
Headquarters Air Force Badge

Air Force Distinguished Service Medal
Defense Superior Service Medal with two bronze oak leaf clusters
Legion of Merit with oak leaf cluster
Defense Meritorious Service Medal
Meritorious Service Medal with four oak leaf clusters
Air Medal
Aerial Achievement Medal with oak leaf cluster
Air Force Commendation Medal with oak leaf cluster
Air Force Achievement Medal
Joint Meritorious Unit Award with four oak leaf clusters
Air Force Outstanding Unit Award with Valor device and three bronze oak leaf clusters
Air Force Organizational Excellence Award with oak leaf cluster
Combat Readiness Medal with two oak leaf clusters
National Defense Service Medal with one bronze service star
Armed Forces Expeditionary Medal with one service star
Southwest Asia Service Medal with service star
Global War on Terrorism Expeditionary Medal
Global War on Terrorism Service Medal
Korea Defense Service Medal
Armed Forces Service Medal
Humanitarian Service Medal with service star
Air Force Overseas Short Tour Service Ribbon
Air Force Overseas Long Tour Service Ribbon with oak leaf cluster
Air Force Expeditionary Service Ribbon with gold frame
Air Force Longevity Service Award with one silver and three bronze oak leaf clusters
Small Arms Expert Marksmanship Ribbon with service star
Air Force Training Ribbon
Philippine Legion of Honor, Legionnaire
Philippine Republic Presidential Unit Citation
NATO Medal for the former Yugoslavia
Kuwait Liberation Medal (Kuwait)

== Effective Dates Of Promotion ==
- Second Lieutenant June 6, 1973
- First Lieutenant June 6, 1975
- Captain June 6, 1977
- Major February 1, 1986
- Lieutenant Colonel April 1, 1989
- Colonel June 1, 1996
- Brigadier General September 1, 2000
- Major General October 1, 2004
- Lieutenant General November 27, 2007

== Retirement ==
Wurster retired from the United States Air Force on 24 June 2011, handing over command of AFSOC to Lieutenant General Eric E. Fiel in a ceremony held at Hurlburt Field. His official retirement date was August 1, 2011.

"Lt. Gen. Wurster has been a brilliant and strong leader," said Admiral Eric Olson, commander of the United States Special Operations Command. "He led by always putting people first in the air and on the ground. Today is more than a transfer of authority. We say goodbye to a great leader and friend ... Gen. Fiel will now bring his own vision,” Olson added. "There will be challenges, but I've seen him face challenges before and overcome many obstacles. In the transition from one commander to another, I know (AFSOC) will continue to excel."

Air Force Chief of Staff General Norton Schwartz presided over the ceremony. "This is a great time to be amongst the Special Operations Squadron," Schwartz said. "Gen. Wurster will now get to enjoy fishing, hunting and life after command service. This is a new and tremendous chapter for you."
