= Wynnewood, Dallas =

Coordinates: 32.7349°N 96.8486°W

Wynnewood is the largest neighborhood in Oak Cliff, Dallas, Texas, constructed after World War II and covering 820 acres (3.3 km^{2}).

== History ==
The foundation for the first house in Wynnewood is being poured. (from The Dallas Morning News [March 5, 1946], Section II, p. 1)

The history of Wynnewood is deeply connected with the development of suburban living in post-World War II America. Indeed, Wynnewood is a southern equivalent of the famous Levittown, New York, a planned community with which Wynnewood is exactly contemporaneous.

Just as Levittown was named after Levitt and Sons, the company that planned and built the suburb, so Wynnewood carries the name of the Wynne family. The 820 acres (3.3 km^{2}) that were to become Wynnewood were originally purchased in 1913 by the American Home Realty Company, but remained undeveloped until the 1940s; at that point the company was acquired by Toddie Lee Wynne Sr. and Benjamin Hick Majors. When Wynne's nephew Angus Gilchrist Wynne Jr., returned from the war, he was appointed president of American Home Realty. His task was to take advantage of the post-war boom, which was propitious for housing development.

Construction took place in several phases. It started in March, 1946, in the triangle marked by Illinois, Bristol, and Garapan. The first homes to be completed were those on Veasy Street (later renamed Wynnewood Drive). The first resident to occupy a Wynnewood home was J. D. Jones of 2342 Veasy. The entire development was largely complete by 1954.

The United States Air Force, Air Defense Command, maintained a Filter Center in the Wynnewood Professional Building, during the late 1950s. The filter center recorded all air traffic (and many tornadoes) in its 72,000 thousand square mile area of responsibility, which reached from Muleshoe in the west, to Ranger in the east, and up to the Red River, and Lake Texoma.

== Conception of the "City of Wynnewood, U.S.A." ==
Advertisement of the American Home Realty Company. Note the map showing the exact boundaries of Wynnewood. (from The Dallas Morning News [March 3, 1946], Section II, p. 14)

Angus Wynne and architect Roscoe DeWitt conceived of Wynnewood as "one-self-contained community," as the American Home Realty Company declared in a contemporary advertisement. Kansas City-based landscape architects and city planners Hare & Hare were responsible for the "architectural vision" of the neighborhood.

Another contemporary ad referred to the "City of Wynnewood, U.S.A." Of course, the Wynnewood community did not grow organically over decades or even centuries, like traditional cities; it reflected the carefully thought-out blueprint of its creators. Wynnewood was to consist of 2,200 homes and 1,000 apartments, with a large shopping area at their center. The homes cost between $6,000 and $20,000, ranging from modest floor plans in the original core of Wynnewood to upscale residences in Wynnewood North. The mix of apartments and homes in different price ranges ensured a certain socio-economic diversity; racial diversity, on the other hand, was not yet conceivable: the community was initially all-white.

In Wynnewood, Wynne and DeWitt attempted to marry the principles of mass production with individuality. In Wynnewood, one would not find "regimented rows upon rows of houses, [or] dreadful uniformity." Indeed, the homes in the Wynnewood community have a sufficient diversity of styles and layouts not to appear like "cookie-cutter" houses. Nevertheless, they were built with great efficiency, from components manufactured in specially established "pre-fabrication mills." A contemporary article describes the work method of the construction teams in the following words:

Employing nearly 300 workers, one-third of whom are carpenters, the contractors have their forces set up in skilled groups specializing in their fields. For example, the employees include groups such as wall erection, rafter erection, frame gables, window and door frames. The groups start down a street in the addition, taking each house in order, and with the completion of their repetitive work on that street, cross over and return down the next street, working much on the order of an assembly line. Following are brick masons who are equipped to complete one house daily.

Wynnewood residential area in a promotional brochure of the American Home Realty Company (ca. 1953)

Inside a Wynnewood home; from the same brochure

Some Wynnewood apartments in the AHR brochure

Great emphasis was placed on the quality of workmanship. For example, the electric wiring in the Wynnewood community followed the standards of the Dallas Adequate Wiring Committee, set up to promote the kind of wiring that would be able to handle the expanding use of electricity for household appliances.

The streets at the core of Wynnewood are named after WWII Navy commanders, ships, and battles: for example, Eisenhower, Salerno, Nicholson, Garapan, Anzio, Grayson, O'Banion, and Bristol. This reflects Angus Wynne's Navy career. DeWitt Circle commemorates the architect.

== Wynnewood Shopping Village ==
Aerial photograph from 1951 showing the location of the Wynnewood Shopping Village within the neighborhood (from The Daily Times Herald [December 16, 1951], Section VI, p. 1.)

Unlike modern-day developers, who often fail to provide neighborhoods with the facilities necessary for everyday life, Wynne and his advisers planned a large shopping center at the heart of their community. Begun in the summer of 1947, by 1954 the Wynnewood Shopping Village had expanded to 150 shops on 53 acres (210,000 m^{2}) with 6,400 parking spaces. There was a movie theater, a post office, the Wynnewood State Bank, department stores, grocery stores, drugstores, restaurants, furniture and jewelry stores, doctors' offices, and even a hotel. What made (and still makes) the Wynnewood Shopping Center unique is the fact that it is laid out like a "village": shops are not crammed into one huge air-conditioned complex, but are housed in blocks of one-story buildings surrounded by trees.

== Wynnewood today ==
Over the decades, Wynnewood has in some ways lost the identity that the founders were hoping to achieve in this particular community. Many of the residents of Wynnewood North, however, engaged through their neighborhood association, still actively press to maintain the uniqueness of their distinctive neighborhood. Wynnewood has retained some of its original characteristics: it is still one of the most diverse neighborhoods in Dallas, not only in socio-economic but now also in racial terms. The homes have turned out to be as solid as their creators promised. The tree-lined streets exude a sense of quietness and comfort. The apartments have become subsidized housing, with some of the problems attendant upon this type of dwelling.

The most disappointing aspect in the recent history of Wynnewood is the fate of the shopping village, which is only a shadow of its former self. Many of its buildings have been razed: the Professional Building (which used to be occupied by doctors' offices) is gone, as are the movie theater, the hotel, and the department stores. As of 2024, the shopping center is undergoing redevelopment anchored by a new Target store.

The following images give an impression of Wynnewood as it looked in 2008.

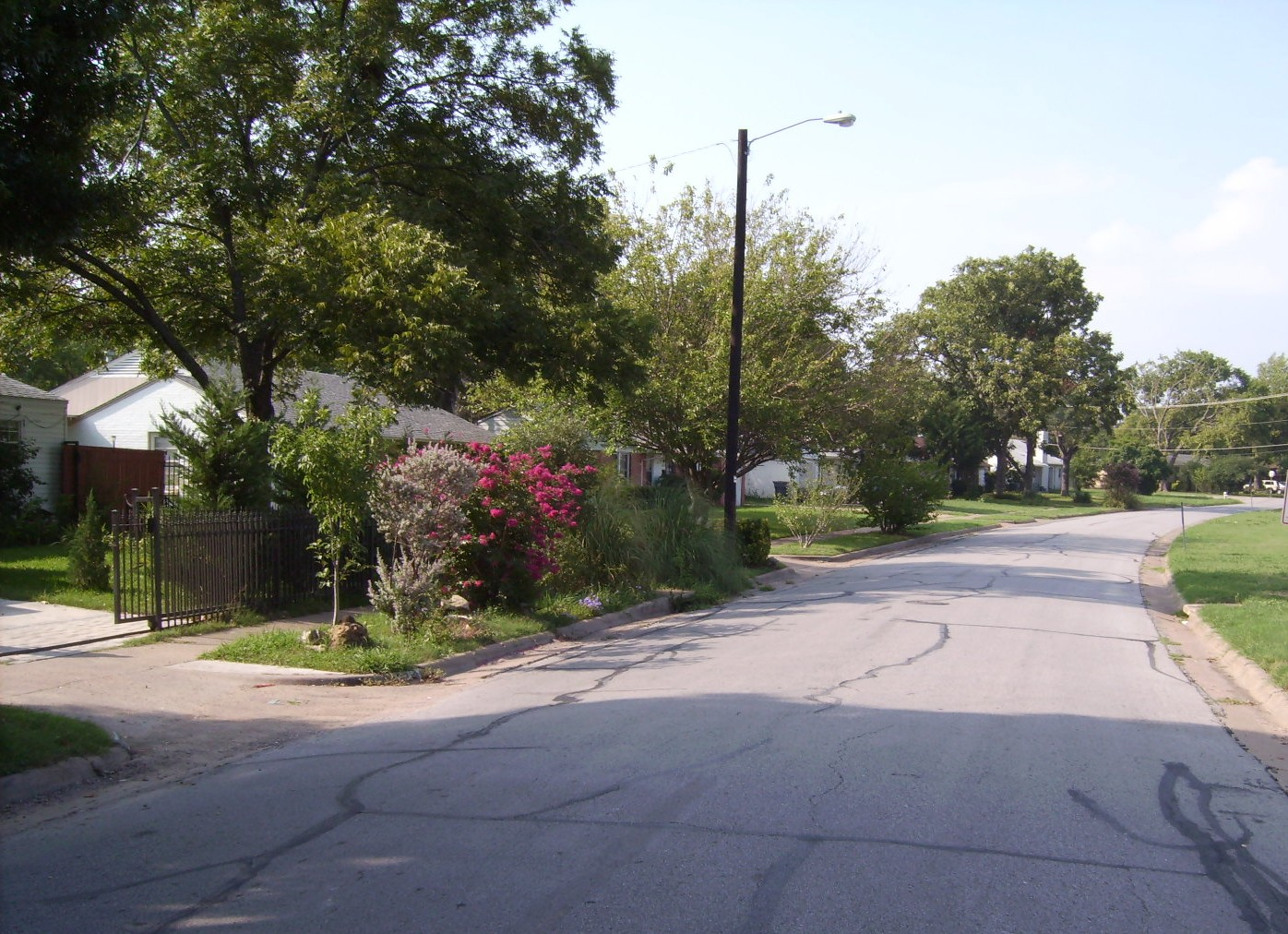
The stretch of Wynnewood Drive where construction began in 1946

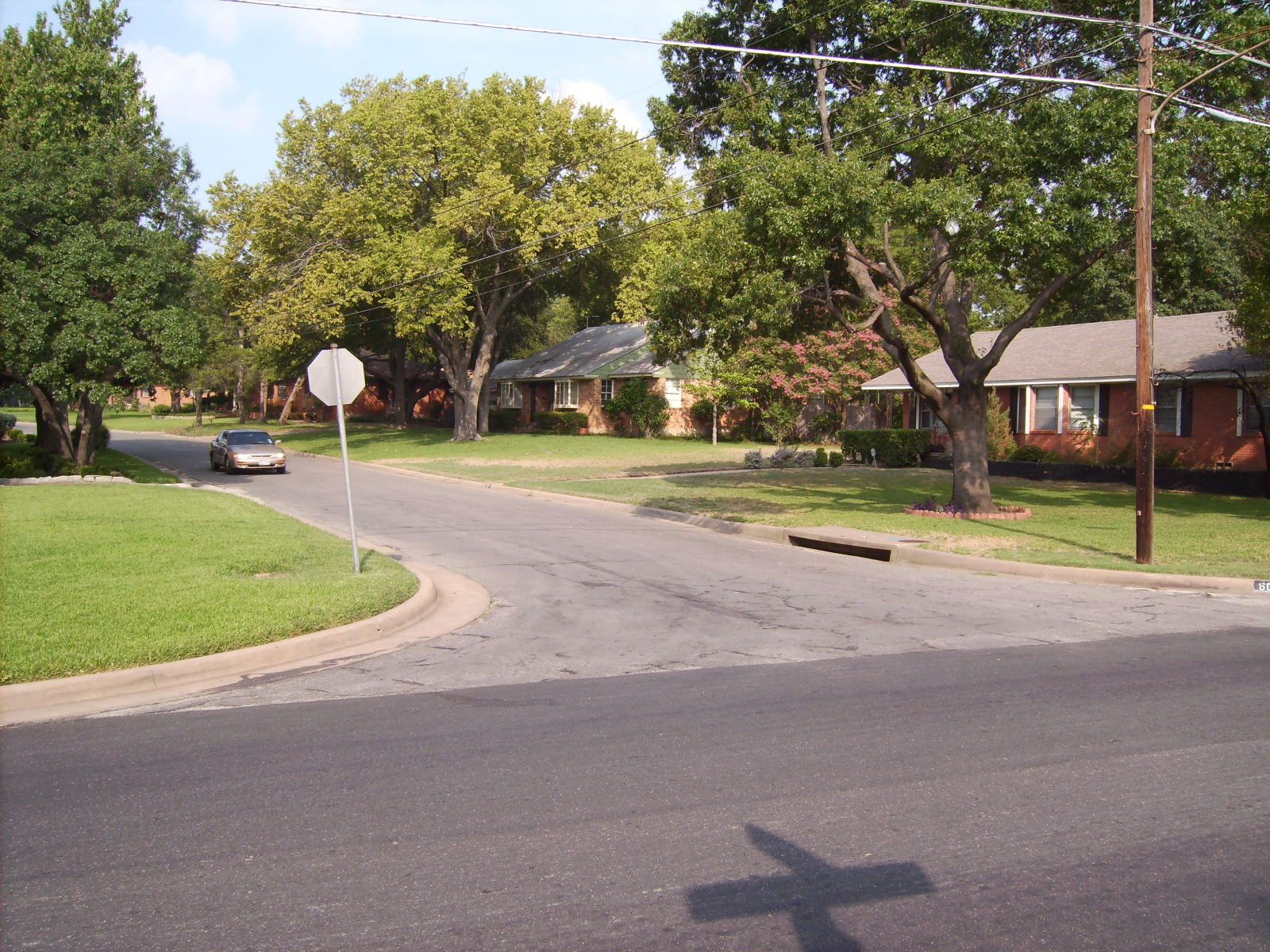
Wynnewood North

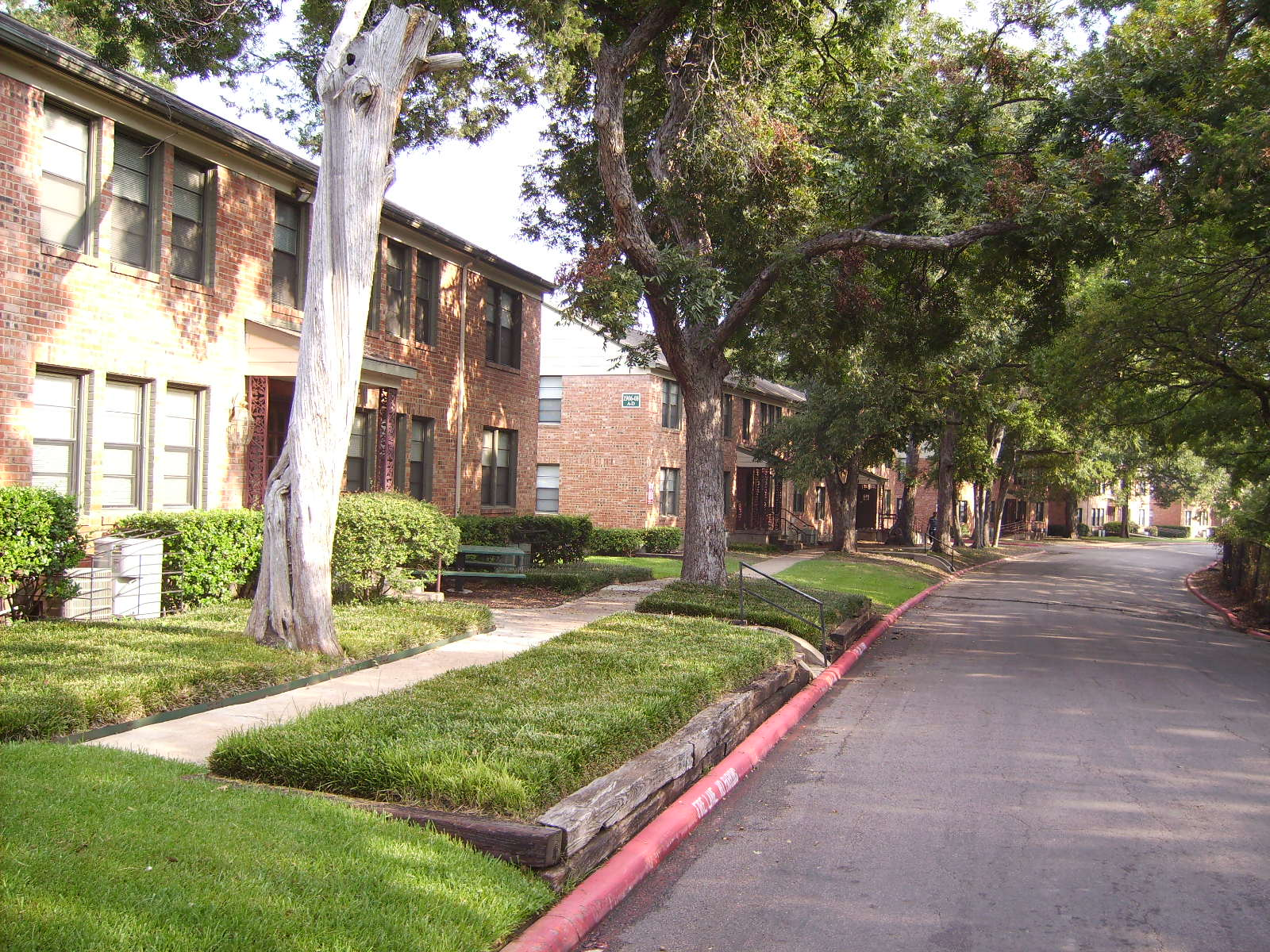
Wynnewood Parks, an apartment complex on Zang Boulevard

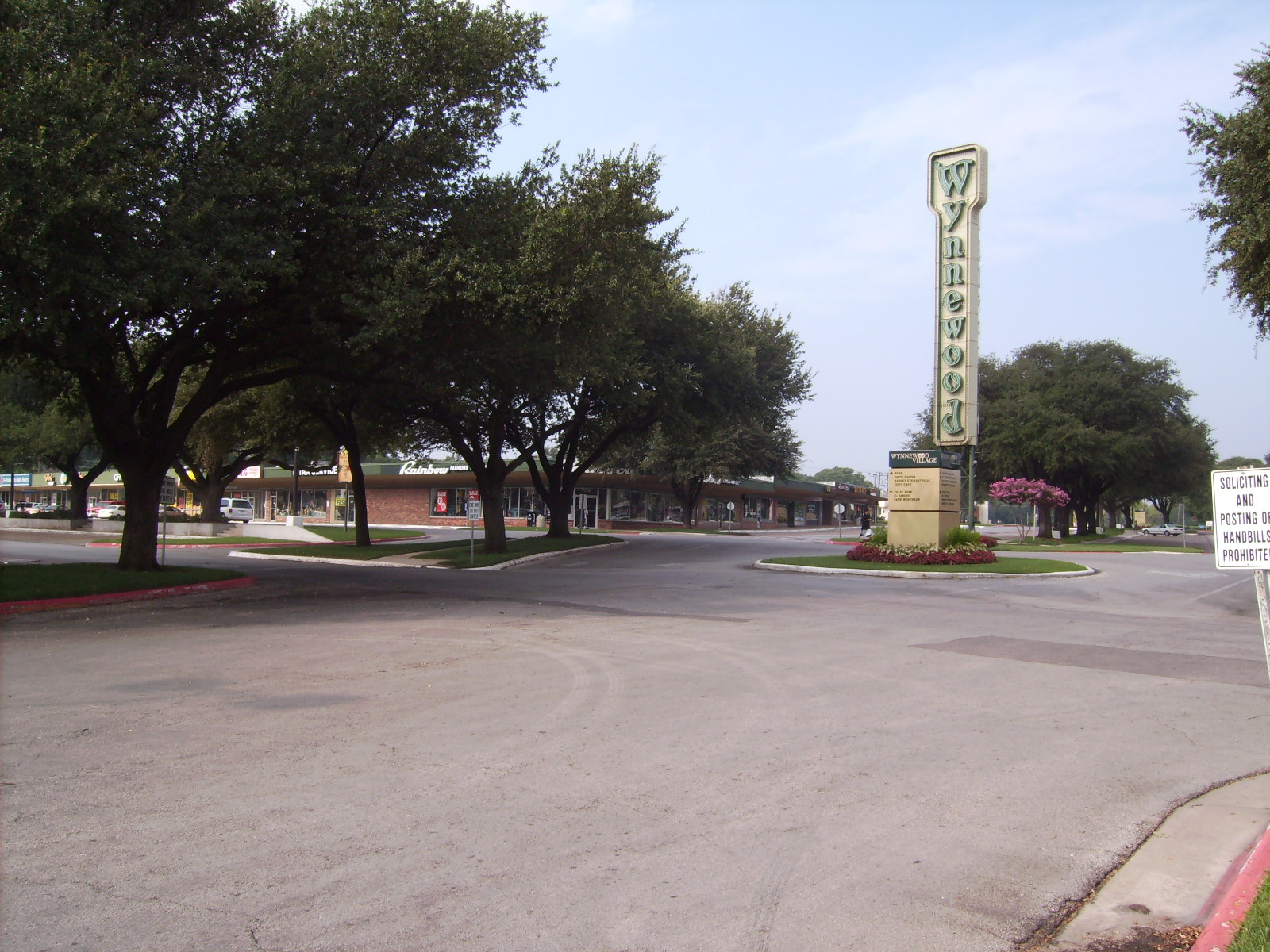
Wynnewood Shopping Village, with the original sign

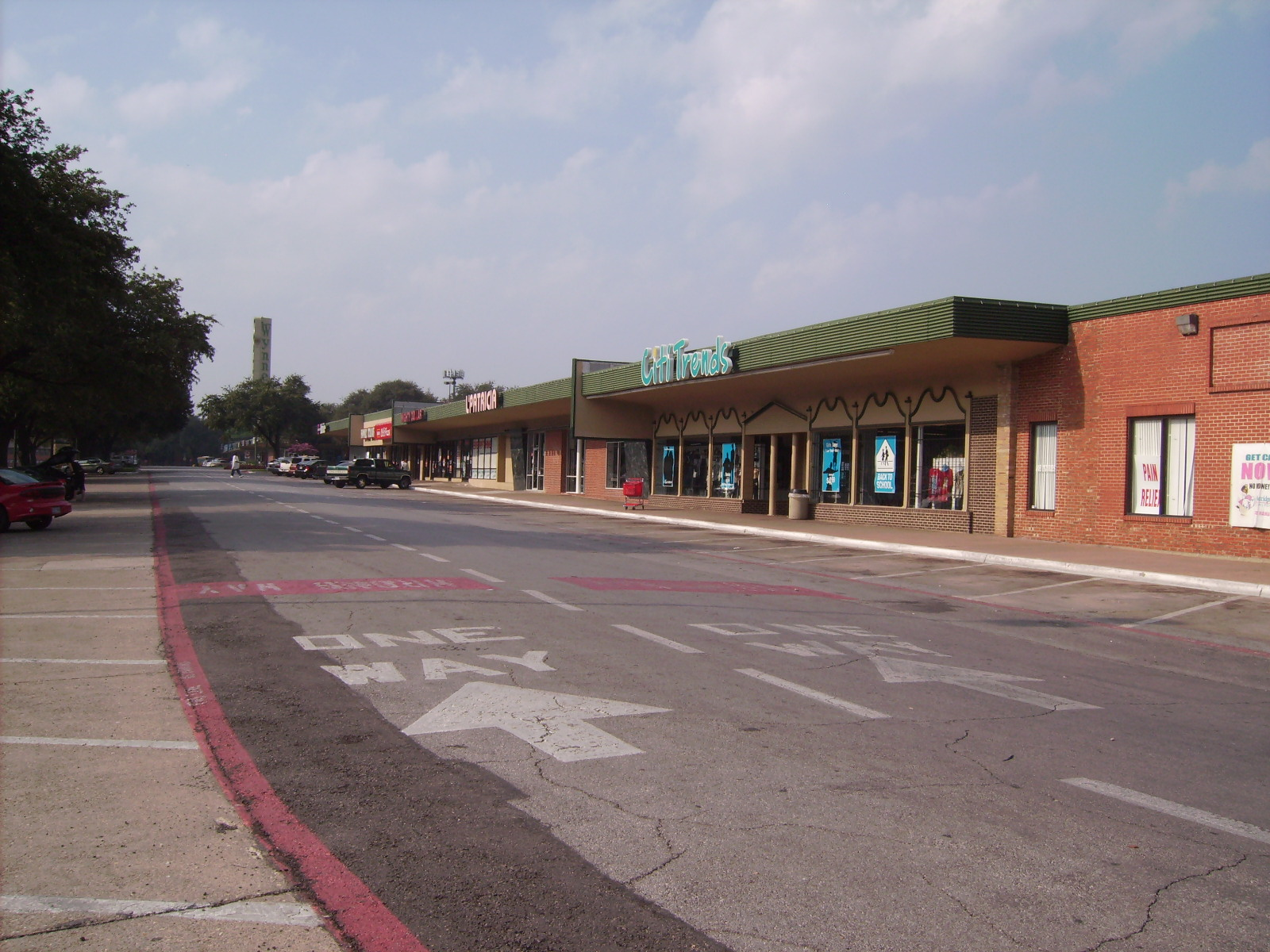
Wynnewood Shopping Village

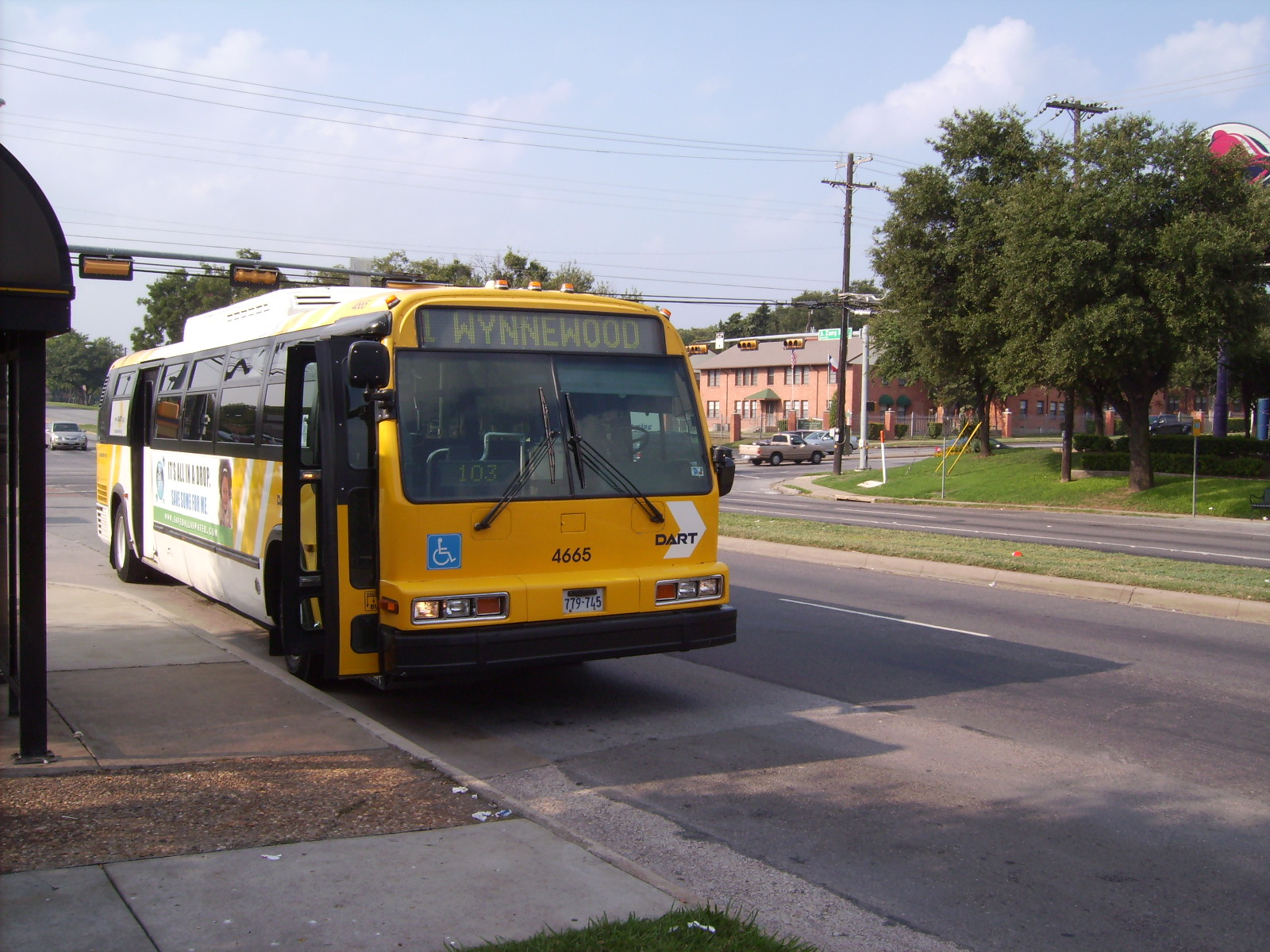
DART Bus No. 1 at the corner of Illinois and Zang

== Sources ==
The Archives for Dallas and Texas History of the Dallas Public Library has a collection of materials relating to the history of Wynnewood: newspaper clippings, photographs, magazine articles, etc. Call number: MA 03.4 ("Wynnewood Scrapbook"). The Public Works and Transportation Survey Records Vault of the City of Dallas contains plats, legal documents, aerial photographs, and some house plans on the Wynnewood neighborhood. The Vault is located at 320 E. Jefferson Blvd., Room 314, Dallas, Texas, 75203.

The Hidden City: Oak Cliff, Texas, by Bill Minutaglio and Holly Williams (Dallas: Elmwood Press and The Old Oak Cliff Conservation League, 1990), focuses on the earlier history of Oak Cliff and mentions Wynnewood only in passing.
