= Science Applications International Corporation =

American information technology company

Science Applications International Corporation, Inc.
- Type: Public company
- Traded as: Nasdaq: SAIC; S&P 400 component
- Industry: Information technology and engineering
- Founded: 1969; 57 years ago (original company); 2013; 13 years ago (as Leidos spin-off; formerly SAIC)
- Headquarters: Reston, Virginia, U.S.
- Area served: Worldwide
- Key people: Donna Morea (chairman)James Reagan (CEO)
- Revenue: ▼US$7.26 billion (2026)
- Net income: ▼US$358 million (2026)
- Number of employees: c. 25,000 (2023)
- Website: saic.com
- Footnotes; Financials as of February 3, 2023; References

Science Applications International Corporation, Inc. (SAIC) is an American technology company headquartered in Reston, Virginia, that provides government services and information technology support.

== History ==
=== 20th century ===
The original SAIC was created in 1969 by J. Robert Beyster. Then on September 27, 2013, it spun off a $4 billion unit which retained its name, while the parent company changed its name to Leidos. The business units were separated into elements focused on 1) direct support and technical advice to government organizations (the SAIC portion), and 2) capability development (Leidos). Following the split, Anthony J. Moraco was appointed CEO of SAIC, and John P. Jumper was appointed CEO of Leidos. The primary motivation for the spinoff was the conflicts of interest provisions in the Federal Acquisition Regulation which prevented the company from bidding on some new contracts because of existing contracts.

=== 21st century ===
Deborah Lee James, president of SAIC's technology and engineering sector, was sworn in as Secretary of the Air Force on December 20, 2013, after being appointed by President Barack Obama.

On May 4, 2015, SAIC acquired Scitor Holdings, Inc. for $790 million to expand its presence in the intelligence industry through classified contracts, cleared personnel, and a robust security infrastructure. Scitor was previously owned by Leonard Green & Partners, L.P., a private equity firm.

On September 10, 2018, SAIC announced its acquisition of Engility, a competitor in the U.S. government services contracting sector, for a combined US$2.5 billion with the merger set to take place in January 2019.

On February 6, 2020, SAIC announced its acquisition of Unisys US Federal, a competitor in the U.S. government services contracting sector, for a combined US$1.2 billion.

In 2021, SAIC acquired Halfaker and Associates, a Virginia-based technology services company founded by veterans’ advocate Frances Dawn Halfaker.

== CityTime payroll scandal ==
In 2012 SAIC was ordered to pay $500 million to the City of New York for overbilling the city over a period of seven years on the CityTime contract. In 2014 Gerard Denault, SAIC's CityTime program manager, and his government contact were sentenced to 20 years in prison for fraud and bribery related to that contract.

== See also ==
- Espionage
- Counterespionage
