= John M. Stemmons =

- Born: July 10, 1909; Dallas, Texas, United States
- Died: July 20, 2001 (aged 92)
- Occupations: Real estate developer and civic leader

John Millard Stemmons (July 10, 1909 - July 20, 2001) was a real estate developer and civic leader in Dallas, Texas. He is best known for his efforts to develop the former flood plain of the Trinity River and his lucrative donation of land for the Stemmons Freeway that was named for his father, Leslie Stemmons.

== Early life ==
Stemmons attended public schools in Illinois and Dallas, Texas. He graduated from Sunset High School in Dallas in 1927 and attended Washington and Lee University, where he received a football injury that prevented his service in World War II. He is a Member of the Sunset High School Hall of Fame.

== Career ==
He joined his father's company, Industrial Properties Corporation, in 1931. The company's business was the development of the land recovered by the erection of a flood-controlling levee system. He continued with the company after his father's death in 1939, rising to become president of Industrial Properties Corporation in 1954 and Chairman/CEO in 1971. He retired in 1994 and was elected Chairman Emeritus.

Initial development of the recovered land was slowed by the onset of the Great Depression. Stemmons partnered with Trammell Crow in the years following World War II as the growing economy improved the value of the property. Their partnership ended when Crow's proposed Dallas Market Center project would involve considerable borrowing at the rate of 6% interest. Stemmons could not imagine carrying such expensive debt, and so sold his interest to Crow.

Stemmons's donation of 100 acres (0.40 km^{2}) of the recovered flood plain to the Texas Highway Department was beneficial in saving the state the cost of acquisition but was even more beneficial to Stemmons and IPC. In the terms of the gift, Stemmons stipulated that frontage roads be added to the project to provide freeway access that vastly increased the value of his property.
