= Winnetka Heights, Dallas =

Coordinates: 32.745°N 96.844°W

Winnetka Heights
- Interactive map of Winnetka Heights
- Country: United States
- State: Texas
- Counties: Dallas
- City: Dallas
- Area: Oak Cliff
- Elevation: 545 ft (166 m)
- ZIP code: 75208
- Area codes: 214, 469, 972

Winnetka Heights is one of the oldest and largest historical districts in the Oak Cliff section of Dallas, Texas (USA). The district is bounded by Davis Street ( SH 180) on the north, 12th Street on the south, Willomet Avenue on the east and Rosemont Avenue on the west. Established in 1910, Winnetka Heights consists of early 20th century wood-frame houses (two-story 4-square and single story prairie style homes predominate).

== History ==
Originally an affluent subdivision of Oak Cliff, Winnetka Heights, along with much of Oak Cliff suffered from poverty and neglect during the 1960s and earlier. Large homes were subdivided into small apartments and city services were scarce. In the mid-1970s, a renewed interest in urban living began a vast restoration process. A committee of the Old Oak Cliff Conservation League was formed in the late 1970s for the purpose of obtaining city, state, and national historic designation for the neighborhood. The committee was successful in obtaining all three historic designations and, it is believed, that at the time the neighborhood was the largest in the country to have the historic designation. Winnetka Heights is now a culturally diverse and vibrant neighborhood.

The Winnetka Heights Historic District is located two miles from downtown Dallas, south of the Trinity River. With over 600 houses, Winnetka Heights is the second largest historic district in Dallas and one of the largest in the state of Texas. The neighborhood was originally platted as part of the Midway Addition and was developed as Winnetka Heights in 1908. The original American Craftsman|Craftsman style bungalows and Four-square Prairie houses are approaching their 100th anniversary.

J.P. Blake, R.S. Waldron, T.S. Miller Jr., and Leslie Stemmons developed Winnetka Heights beginning in 1910. Early advertisements touted an ideal neighborhood with the “3 requisite necessaries to modern home life.” First, Winnetka Heights was located on high ground with distant views of the surrounding countryside and downtown. Second, it offered modern amenities such as artesian water, sewers, telephones, electric lines, paved streets with curbs, and building restrictions. And third, its convenient proximity to downtown made it accessible by streetcar. Today residents of Winnetka Heights Historic District enjoy the benefits of this early planning, with harmonious architecture, mature landscaping, and modern city services, all in a close-in residential neighborhood.

Some of the city's stateliest houses were built in Winnetka Heights and include the houses of its developers. The Stemmons house built on the northeast corner of Rosemont and Jefferson was demolished and replaced by the Salvation Army. Waldron's craftsman house stood on the southwest corner of Rosemont and Davis and is now an apartment complex.

Strolling down its streets,porches, trees, houses, recalls nearly a century ago when Dallas was coming of age. The Winnetka Heights Historic District retains the look and feel of an early American suburb, making it one of Dallas’ historic neighborhoods.

== Historic buildings ==
- The former Southland Ice Company building at W. Twelfth St and S. Edgefield Ave operated as one of a handful of regional Ice houses. In 1927, the company began selling milk, eggs, and bread, converting the business slowly into that of a convenience store. In January 1946, after a period of growth, the company rebranded as 7-Eleven. This location closed in the late 1990s. Now, the building bears a historical landmark designation and is an office of the League of United Latin American Citizens (LULAC).
- The former Winnetka Congregational Church building, located on the corner of W. Twelfth St and S. Windomere Ave, is the home of Arts Mission Oak Cliff (AMOC).
- Still standing is the Miller house at 101 N. Montclair and the Blake house, now the Turner House (home to the Oak Cliff Society of Fine Arts).
- Early residents included Texas oilman and Winnetka Heights developer J.P. Blake, who resided at 401 N. Rosemont; Thomas Jefferson Hubbert, who was appointed by President Grover Cleveland as the U.S. Pension Examiner for Texas and the Old Indian Territories, who resided at 137 S. Montclair; and Ellis Cockrell, a prominent cattle rancher, and descendant of the pioneer Cockrell family, who resided at 201 N. Montclair.
