= Leslie Stemmons =

American businessman

- Born: Leslie Allison Stemmons; November 8, 1876; Dallas, Texas, United States
- Died: October 15, 1939 (aged 62); Dallas, Texas
- Education: Southwestern University, University of Chicago
- Occupation: Businessman
- Known for: Levee improvements in Dallas
- Spouse: Elizabeth Story (m. 1902; died 1910) Proctor Howell (m. 1915)
- Children: 4 including John M. Stemmons and Leslie Allison Stemmons Jr.

Leslie Allison Stemmons (November 8, 1876 – October 15, 1939) was an influential American businessman based in Dallas, Texas. He was known for his involvement in the Dallas levee improvement project after the flooding of the 1908 Trinity River.

== Early life and education ==
Stemmons was born in Dallas on November 8, 1876, the son of John Martin and Rebecca (née Allison) Stemmons. He attended Southwestern University in Georgetown, Texas and graduated from the University of Chicago.

== Career ==
Before returning to Dallas in 1900 to work selling fire insurance and real estate, Stemmons worked briefly in Chicago real estate. As a real estate agent, Stemmons developed the Miller-Stemmons addition, Winnetka Heights, Rosemont Crest, Sunset Hill, Sunset Annex, Sunset Summit, Sunset Heights, and Sunset Crest in Oak Cliff.

He was a leader in the annexation of Oak Cliff and the building of the Houston Street Viaduct between Dallas and Oak Cliff. Stemmons was also a president and director of Atlas Metal Works, a director of Southwestern Land and Loan Company, and a director of Evergreen Hills, Incorporated. He was a member of the Dallas Historical Society, the Methodist Church, and the Dallas Real Estate Board.

In 1908 the Trinity River overflowed Commerce Street by 52 ft 6 in (16.00 m), and the Ulrickson Committee was formed to draft a flood-control plan. Leslie Stemmons served on the committee. In 1926 he helped establish the City and County of Dallas Levee Improvement District and served as the chairman of the Board of Supervisors of the District. The plan involved moving the Trinity River channel one mile west and building a series of levees. In 1928 the city gave a group of river bottomland owners, the Industrial Properties Association, a charter to develop the reclaimed land for industrial use, as the Trinity Industrial District.

== Personal life ==
On July 16, 1902, he married Elizabeth Story. They had three children. Elizabeth died on January 3, 1910. On October 4, 1915, Stemmons married Proctor Howell. They had one son.

== Death and legacy ==
After Stemmons died, his sons carried on the Dallas Levee Improvement District project. In later years the Stemmons family donated much of the valuable right-of-way for the building of the Stemmons Freeway. Stemmons died at his home in Dallas on October 15, 1939, and was buried in Oak Cliff Cemetery.

Leslie Stemmons Elementary School, located in the Western Park neighborhood of Dallas, was named for him.
