= Wolfgang W. Wurster =

German archaeologist and architecture researcher

- Born: July 7, 1937; Aalen, Germany
- Died: December 29, 2003 (aged 66)
- Education: Technical University of Munich (Diplom, Doctorate)
- Occupations: Researcher, Archaeologist, Architect
- Employer(s): Technical University of Munich; Technische Universität Darmstadt
- Known for: Excavation methodology, history of architecture, South American and Mediterranean archaeology
- Notable work: Alt-Ägina. Band 1: Der Apollontempel (1974); Die Schatz-Gräber. Archäologische Expeditionen durch die Hochkulturen Südamerikas (1991)
- Awards: Ceram-Preis, Rheinisches Landesmuseum Bonn (1991)

Wolfgang W. Wurster (7 July 1937 – 29 December 2003) was a German researcher in the fields of architecture and archaeology.

Wolfgang Wurster was born in Aalen, Germany. He studied architecture at the Technical University of Munich. He undertook additional studies in art history and American history, in the United States and Spain. In 1963, he received his Diplom from his German university. From this point on, he concentrated on excavation methodology, CRM, and the history of architecture. In 1971, he obtained a doctorate of engineering, his dissertation being Der dorische Peripteraltempel auf dem Kolonnahügel in Aegina. In addition to holding academic positions in Munich, he also was a faculty member of the Technische Universität Darmstadt. He did field work in the Mediterranean and South American (Ecuador and Peru).

His book Die Schatz-Gräber. Archäologische Expeditionen durch die Hochkulturen Südamerikas (1991) brought him the Rheinisches Landesmuseum Bonn's Ceram-Preis for the best book of archaeology.

== Publications ==
- Alt-Ägina. Band 1: Der Apollontempel, von Zabern, Mainz 1974
- Die Schatz-Gräber. Archäologische Expeditionen durch die Hochkulturen Südamerikas, GEO, Hamburg 1991 ISBN 3-570-01000-7

== About Wurster ==
- Burkhart Vogt: Wolfgang W. Wurster † (7 July 1937 – 29 December 2003), In: Bericht über die 42. Tagung für Ausgrabungswissenschaft und Bauforschung, Habelt, Bonn 2004
- Klaus Dornisch: Einem Freund zur Erinnerung. Wolfgang W. Wurster in memoriam, In Nürnberger Blätter zur Archäologie 20 (2004), S. 198-200
