= National Distress System =

The U.S. National Distress System (NDRS) was established in the early 1970s as a VHF-FM-based radio communication system that has a range of up to 20 nautical miles (40 km) along most of the U.S. shoreline for the United States Coast Guard. While this system has served the Coast Guard well over the years, it consists of out-of-date and non-standard equipment with many limitations. This system is being replaced by Rescue 21.

== Overview ==
The Coast Guard currently operates a National Distress System, a network of about 300 VHF transceivers and antenna high-sites which are remotely controlled by regional communications centers to provide coverage extending out to at least 20 nautical miles from shore, and often much further. Coverage is reasonably continuous through most of the Atlantic, Gulf and Pacific Coasts, the Great Lakes, and many rivers. Many urban areas of the U.S. are also covered.

== Objective ==
This system serves as:

- The primary means for mariners to contact the Coast Guard in a distress - over 20,000 distress calls are received yearly over this system,
- the primary means for broadcasting urgent marine information to mariners
- A command and control system for Coast Guard and other vessels.

== Status ==
Of the 25 largest U.S. cities ranked by population in the 1990 census by the Department of Commerce Census Bureau, 19 cities, i.e. 76%, are close to navigable waters and are within at least partial coverage of the U.S. Coast Guard’s VHF National Distress System.

Each National Distress System VHF site consists of a receiver guarding VHF Channel 16, the maritime distress, safety and calling channel, and a transceiver capable of operating on one of six fixed maritime channels. Two of these channels are always Channel 16 and 22A.

The system is not Global Maritime Distress & Safety System-compatible, coverage gaps exist in several locations, it cannot operate on public safety channels, it has no direction finding capability, distress calls cannot be received at a high site when the site is transmitting on any channel, and the system is near the end of its useful life. For these reasons, the Coast Guard began to modernize this system in 2003.

The National Distress System is operated by 45 Coast Guard Group and Section Command Centers, each acting as a Maritime Rescue Coordination Center having a specific area of responsibility.

== VHF Distress Coverage Charts ==
Charts showing predicted areas of VHF National Distress System coverage can be downloaded in .jpg format. Coverage plots assume a mobile transmitter power of 1 watt at sea level over water, and of 25 watts over land. Alaskan coverage was based upon reception of a 1 Watt transmission from a handheld radio 2 meters above sea level.

Predictions (except Alaska) were made by the DOD Joint Spectrum Center in Annapolis MD in March 1994. Note charts are predictions of radio coverage; actual radio coverage may vary. Some site locations have also changed since these predictions were made. The average chart file size is about 100 kb.

Note: Most plots were produced on vellum overlays at scales of 1:1,000,000 and reduced to standard page size. Due to this reduction and to file size limitations, some chart features may be difficult to read.

== Limitations ==
Limitations include:

- No direction finding capability.
- Numerous geographic communication's coverage gaps.
- Limited interoperability with other emergency response services.
- Single-channel radio operation, which prohibits the ability to receive multiple radio calls.
