= Overbilling =

Charging more than is legal or ethically acceptable

Overbilling (sometimes spelled as over-billing) is the practice of charging more than what is legally or ethically acceptable on an invoice or bill.

== Overview ==
=== Contractors and professionals ===
Overbilling in the medical industry can occur when doctors seek to overcharge the government or an insurance company for the actual services provided to their patients or by charging for services not provided. Overbilling in the legal industry can occur with both large institutional clients and smaller, individual companies or personal clients. Overbilling can be an issue in the consultancy and information technology industries as well. Stephen Northcutt, Cynthia Madden, and Cynthia Welti wrote that overbilling occurs more often within larger companies where there is less of a personal connection between employees or contractors and the firm being billed.

=== Institutional overbilling ===
Overbilling can occur when larger institutions or governments create errors in their calculations of how much various individuals may owe. Banks and credit card providers can also overbill clients, or indirectly facilitate overbilling through the method by which they allow vendors to charge a client after the client has accented to having their card billed. It has been argued that overbilling is rampant enough in some industries that employees that refuse to overbill risk their jobs due to a lack of economic foresight or acuity in management policies or business plans.

== Laws ==
Overbilling clients can constitute an example of breach of contract and result in fines, lawsuits, or prison time. Overbilling can also be a part of U.S. Racketeer Influenced and Corrupt Organizations Act schemes and other organized crime activities. Some individuals that have been convicted of overbilling were done so under the charge of mail fraud, or under the False Claims Act in the United States.

Leonard Vona wrote that, "Overbilling schemes differ from false billing schemes in that the vendor is a real vendor and actual goods or services are provided. The real vendor typically commits the scheme in collusion with a company employee. The real vendor over charges the company and an accounts payable manager approves the vendor invoice for payment. The vendor can commit the scheme without internal collusion by taking advantage of known internal control weaknesses." He also wrote that overbilling can occur via fictitious charges, inflated prices, inflating the quantity on a statement above the actual quantity delivery, providing sub-standard products, charging for goods or services a vendor knows a company does not need, charging too much, and others.

== Anti-overbilling practices ==
Overbilling is a part of many fraud audit infrastructures employed by large companies. Computer programs and software is often used to screen a company's finances to check for overbilling or symptoms of overbilling. Overbilling has been the focus of several infamous scandals, such as the Worldcom scandal and the bankruptcy of W. T. Grant.
