= East Texas A&M Lions men's basketball statistical leaders =

The East Texas A&M Lions men's basketball statistical leaders are individual statistical leaders of the East Texas A&M Lions men's basketball program in various categories, including points, assists, blocks, rebounds, and steals. Within those areas, the lists identify single-game, single-season, and career leaders. The Lions represent East Texas A&M University (ETAMU) in the NCAA Division I Southland Conference.

East Texas A&M began competing in intercollegiate basketball in 1916. However, the school's record book does not generally list records from before the 1950s, as records from before this period are often incomplete and inconsistent. Since scoring was much lower in this era, and teams played much fewer games during a typical season, it is likely that few or no players from this era would appear on these lists anyway.

ETAMU, then known as East Texas State, was a founding member of the NAIA in 1940, remaining in that body until 1982, when it joined NCAA Division II. The school, which changed its name to Texas A&M University–Commerce in 1996 and again to the current East Texas A&M University in November 2024, did not join Division I until the 2022–23 season. This history is significant because the official recording of statistics began at different times in different organizations, as well as different NCAA divisions.

The NAIA record books do not indicate when the organization began officially recording statistics on a national basis, but its oldest record in any significant statistical category (as of 2022–23) dates to the 1952–53 season. The NCAA has recorded individual scoring statistics throughout the "modern era" of basketball, which it defines as starting with the 1937–38 season, the first after the center jump after each made field goal was abolished, with weekly recording of scoring leaders starting in 1947–48. Individual rebounding was first recorded in 1950–51, as were individual assists. While rebounding has been recorded in every subsequent season, the NCAA stopped recording individual assists after the 1951–52 season. Recording of assists resumed in D-I in 1983–84, but that statistic was not recorded in D-II until 1988–89. Similarly, while the NCAA started recording blocks and steals in D-I in 1988–89, it did not record those statistics in D-II until 1992–93. ETAMU record books include players in all named statistics, regardless of whether they were officially recorded by any of the governing bodies in which it was a member.

These lists are updated through the end of the 2021–22 season.

== Scoring ==
Career
Rk	Player	Points	Seasons
1	Nate Granger	2384	1973–74 1974–75 1975–76 1976–77
2	O'Neal Tarrant	2203	1972–73 1973–74 1974–75 1975–76
3	Bennett Fields	1810	1985–86 1986–87 1987–88 1988–89
4	Jason Hall	1666	1992–93 1993–94 1994–95 1995–96
5	Larry McGhee	1580	1974–75 1975–76 1976–77 1977–78
6	Jeff Fitch	1478	1963–64 1964–65 1965–66 1966–67
7	Hugo Cabrera	1458	1972–73 1973–74 1974–75 1975–76
8	Erik Pinter	1447	1992–93 1993–94 1994–95 1995–96
9	Greg Johnson	1381	1980–81 1981–82 1982–83 1983–84
10	Clarence Lynch	1346	1952–53 1953–54 1954–55

Season
Rk	Player	Points	Season
1	Nate Granger	700	1976–77
2	O'Neal Tarrant	668	1973–74
3	Lee Johnson	653	1978–79
4	O'Neal Tarrant	651	1974–75
5	Bennett Fields	648	1988–89
6	Nate Granger	644	1974–75
7	Larry McGhee	633	1977–78
8	Scooby Johnson	621	2007–08
9	Ollie Hoops	598	1981–82
10	Mike Knorr	594	1989–90

Single game
Rk	Player	Points	Season	Opponent
1	Phil Andrews	57	1965–66	Stephen F. Austin
	Phil Andrews	57	1965–66	Sul Ross State
3	Nate Granger	55	1976–77	Paul Quinn
4	Calvin Walker	52	1969–70	Texas Southern
5	Mike Williams	45	1979–80	Texas Lutheran
6	Larry McGhee	44	1977–78	Benedictine
	Nate Granger	44	1975–76	Texas College
8	Bill Gaines	43	1967–68	LeTourneau
	Lee Johnson	43	1978–79	Angelo State
10	Bill Gaines	41	1967–68	Austin College

== Rebounds ==
Career
Rk	Player	Rebounds	Seasons
1	Nate Granger	1146	1973–74 1974–75 1975–76 1976–77
2	Jim Miller	973	1952–53 1953–54 1954–55
3	Hugo Cabrera	832	1972–73 1973–74 1974–75 1975–76
4	Whitney Miller	748	1960–61 1961–62 1962–63 1963–64
5	Mike Williams	691	1976–77 1977–78 1978–79 1979–80
6	Bob Williams	676	1953–54 1954–55 1955–56
7	Jason Hall	651	1992–93 1993–94 1994–95 1995–96
8	Mike Knorr	596	1988–89 1989–90
	Erik Pinter	596	1992–93 1993–94 1994–95 1995–96
10	Billy Relford	591	1980–81 1981–82 1982–83 1983–84

Season
Rk	Player	Rebounds	Season
1	Jim Miller	465	1954–55
2	Darrell Williams	397	2014–15
3	Jermaine Thomas	341	1998–99
4	Whitney Miller	325	1962–63
5	Nate Granger	319	1974–75
6	Nate Granger	314	1973–74
7	Mike Knorr	313	1988–89
8	Nate Granger	304	1976–77
9	Whitney Miller	295	1963–64
	Lee Johnson	295	1978–79

Single game
Rk	Player	Rebounds	Season	Opponent
1	Bob Williams	27	1955–56	Texas A&M-Kingsville
2	Darrell Williams	21	2014–15	Arlington Baptist
	Darrell Williams	21	2014–15	West Texas A&M
4	Darrell Williams	20	2014–15	Dallas Baptist
5	Dorian Armstrong	19	2016–17	Cameron
	Darrell Williams	19	2014–15	Eastern N.M.
7	Darrell Williams	18	2014–15	Angelo State
8	Darrell Williams	17	2014–15	California Baptist
	Darrell Williams	17	2014–15	Angelo State

== Assists ==
Career
Rk	Player	Assists	Seasons
1	Larry McGhee	529	1974–75 1975–76 1976–77 1977–78
2	Hosea Lee	462	1987–88 1988–89 1989–90 1990–91
3	Brandon Manning	395	1998–99 1999–00
4	Tim Cleveland	336	1992–93 1993–94 1994–95 1995–96
5	Ross Hodge	326	2001–02 2002–03
6	Jimmy Foster	254	1992–93 1993–94 1994–95 1995–96
7	O'Neal Tarrant	251	1972–73 1973–74 1974–75 1975–76
8	Mark Austin	249	1976–77 1977–78 1979–80 1980–81
9	Rusty Harden	244	1986–87 1987–88 1988–89 1989–90
10	Brad Hambrick	239	2008–09 2009–10 2010–11 2011–12

Season
Rk	Player	Assists	Season
1	Ross Hodge	213	2001–02
2	Brandon Manning	201	1998–99
3	Brandon Manning	194	1999–00
4	Larry McGhee	181	1977–78
5	Larry McGhee	176	1976–77
6	Hosea Lee	169	1988–89
7	Hosea Lee	161	1990–91
8	Gianni Hunt	157	2025–26
9	O'Neal Tarrant	154	1974–75
10	Allen Walker	151	2004–05

Single game
Rk	Player	Assists	Season	Opponent
1	Brandon Manning	16	1999–00	Central Oklahoma
2	Reggie Reid	13	2018–19	Eastern N.M.
3	Gianni Hunt	11	2025–26	Dallas Christian
4	Anthony Adams	10	2014–15	Dallas Baptist
	Devin Bethely	10	2020–21	St. Mary's (TX)
	Alonzo Dodd	10	2023–24	Stonehill
	Gianni Hunt	10	2025–26	UT Rio Grande Valley
	Willie Rooks	10	2018–19	Angelo St.
	Trey Seymore	10	2016–17	Arlington Baptist
	Carson Tuttle	10	2018–19	Eastern N.M.

== Steals ==
Career
Rk	Player	Steals	Seasons
1	Jason Hall	214	1992–93 1993–94 1994–95 1995–96
2	Hosea Lee	185	1987–88 1988–89 1989–90 1990–91
3	Bennett Fields	129	1985–86 1986–87 1987–88 1988–89
4	Brad Hambrick	127	2008–09 2009–10 2010–11 2011–12
5	Darrell Waters	124	1996–97 1997–98
6	Rusty Harden	114	1986–87 1987–88 1988–89 1989–90
7	Chris Metze	100	1996–97 1997–98
	Lamar Searight	100	2005–06 2006–07
	Khaliq Abdul-Mateen	100	2020–21 2021–22 2022–23 2023–24 2024–25
10	Brandon Manning	96	1998–99 1999–00
	Fabian Pittman	96	1997–98 2000–01

Season
Rk	Player	Steals	Season
1	Jason Hall	70	1995–96
2	Darrell Waters	66	1996–97
3	Bennett Fields	65	1987–88
	Chris Metze	65	1996–97
5	Dumond Freeman	64	1997–98
	Larry McGhee	64	1977–78
7	Tahaun Ford	62	1991–92
8	DeUndrae Spraggins	58	2008–09
	Darrell Waters	58	1997–98
10	Malik Albert	57	2016–17

Single game
Rk	Player	Steals	Season	Opponent
1	Deonta Terrell	7	2019–20	St. Edward's
2	Anthony Adams	6	2014–15	Henderson St
3	Khaliq Abdul-Mateen	5	2023–24	Dallas Christian
	Malik Albert	5	2016–17	Newman
	Srdan Budimir	5	2018–19	Tarleton St.
	De'Andre Carson	5	2015–16	Oklahoma Christian
	De'Andre Carson	5	2016–17	Western N.M.
	Trey Conrod	5	2018–19	MSU Texas
	Gianni Hunt	5	2025–26	Texas A&M Corpus Christi
	Reggie Reid	5	2018–19	Tex. A&M-Kingsville
	Willie Rooks	5	2018–19	DBU
	Deonta Terrell	5	2019–20	UT Tyler

== Blocks ==
Career
Rk	Player	Blocks	Seasons
1	Christian Macauley	128	2013–14 2014–15
2	Lee Johnson	118	1977–78 1978–79
3	Thaddeus Daggett	113	2002–03 2003–04
4	Jermaine Thomas	95	1998–99 1999–00
5	Bryant Crowder	75	2015–16
6	Clashon Gaffney	73	2021–22
7	Rodney Brown	64	2018–19 2019–20 2020–21 2021–22
8	Josh Taylor	62	2024–25 2025–26
9	Craig Fofang	59	2011–12 2012–13 2013–14 2014–15 2015–16
	Harold Chambers	59	1996–97 1997–98 1998–99 1999–00
	Dorian Armstrong	59	2016–17 2017–18

Season
Rk	Player	Blocks	Season
1	Lee Johnson	84	1978–79
2	Bryant Crowder	75	2015–16
3	Christian Macauley	74	2013–14
4	Clashon Gaffney	73	2021–22
5	Jermaine Thomas	65	1998–99
6	Thaddeus Daggett	64	2002–03
7	Christian Macauley	54	2014–15
8	Thaddeus Daggett	49	2003–04
9	Dorian Armstrong	44	2016–17
10	Josh Taylor	41	2024–25

Single game
Rk	Player	Blocks	Season	Opponent
1	Bryant Crowder	7	2015–16	Central Christian College
	Clashon Gaffney	7	2021–22	Okla. Christian
	Nick Goellner	7	2004–05	Texas A&M-Kingsville
4	Kwo Agwa	6	2023–24	Incarnate Word
	Bryant Crowder	6	2015–16	Midwestern State
	Bryant Crowder	6	2015–16	Arlington Baptist
	Bryant Crowder	6	2015–16	Harding
	Bryant Crowder	6	2015–16	Western State Colo.
	Bryant Crowder	6	2015–16	Harding
	Christian Macauley	6	2013–14	Henderson State
