= Bernie S. Siegel =

American physician and writer (born 1932)

Bernie Siegel
- Born: October 14, 1932 (age 93); Brooklyn, New York
- Education: Colgate University, Cornell University
- Occupations: Surgeon, author, New Age speaker
- Employer: Yale University
- Spouse: Bobbie
- Parent(s): Simon B. Siegel and Rose Siegel

Bernie Siegel (born October 14, 1932) is an American writer and retired pediatric surgeon, who writes on the relationship between the patient and the healing process. He is known for his best-selling book Love, Medicine and Miracles.

== Early life and education ==
Siegel was born on October 14, 1932, in Brooklyn, New York. He received a B.A. from Colgate University and his M.D. from Cornell University Medical College, graduating with Phi Beta Kappa and Alpha Omega Alpha honors. He was trained in surgery at Yale–New Haven Hospital, West Haven Veteran's Hospital and the UPMC Children's Hospital of Pittsburgh.

== Career ==
=== Career ===
Siegel practiced general medicine and pediatric surgery until 1989, when he retired from Yale as an Assistant Clinical Professor of General and Pediatric Surgery.

=== Medical research and advocacy ===
==== Psychosocial support therapy ====
Exceptional Cancer Patients (ECP) is a non-profit organization founded by Siegel in 1978. As described in a 1989 article in The New York Times, patients "with cancer and such other serious illnesses as AIDS and multiple sclerosis use group and individual psychotherapy, imagery exercises and dream work to try to unravel their emotional distress, which, Siegel says, strongly contributes to their physical maladies." The ECP was created to provide resources, professional training programs and interdisciplinary retreats that help people facing the challenges of cancer and other chronic illnesses. In the fall of 1999, the Mind-Body Wellness Center (owned and operated by Meadville Medical Center and MMC Health Systems, Inc., a non-profit organization) acquired and assumed operations of the ECaP.

In 2008, Jerome Groopman, reviewing Anne Harrington's The Cure Within: A History of Mind-Body Medicine, noted that a study by David Spiegel which (Harrington wrote) appeared to support Siegel's claims that breast cancer was partly caused by emotional turmoil, and that "dramatic remissions could occur if patients simply gave up their emotional repression, without chemotherapy or radiation." However, Groopman noted that later trials failed to show any significant beneficial effects.

Siegel's theories concerning the purported benefits of psychosocial support therapy remain unproven. He has stated: "a vigorous immune system can overcome cancer if it is not interfered with, and emotional growth toward greater self-acceptance and fulfillment helps keep the immune system strong", but Stephen Barret argues that Siegel has published no scientific study supporting these claims.

Siegel is an Academic Director of the Experiential Health and Healing program at The Graduate Institute in Bethany, Connecticut.

==== Literary reviews ====
Literary critic Anatole Broyard, writing in The New York Times, describes him as "a sort of Donald Trump of critical illness" and "not a gifted writer"; and while agreeing that Siegel is a surgeon, writes that he "might sometimes be mistaken for a pop psychiatrist." Broyard is critical of some of Siegel's practices, such as "imaging", where cancer patients imagine their good cells defeating their bad cells. Yet, Broyard concludes, Siegel does bring "an element of camaraderie" and offers patients hope, which is "a godsend to many people who are too sick to object to his style."

Los Angeles Times reviewer Joan Borysenko described Siegel's first book, Love, Medicine and Miracles, as "incredibly inspiring and sure to be controversial". She commented, "Excellent research is reviewed side-by-side with uncontrolled, highly questionable studies." Describing Siegel as an "extremist" who "views cancer and nearly all diseases as psychosomatic", the review concluded that "his message distills down to one that the head may question, but in which the heart delights". A second Los Angeles Times review of the same book said, "The book works best as a passionate exhortation to care for yourself, emotionally as well as physically. As a treatise on disease, it's trendy but ultimately oppressive."

In 1988, Siegel's Love, Medicine and Miracles ranked #9 on The New York Times Best Seller list of hardcover nonfiction books. The book remained on the Times bestseller list for more than a year. The paperback version was on The New York Times Best Seller list from 1988 to 1994. It was also included in Sheldon Zerden's The Best of Health: The 100 Best Health Books. His book Peace, Love and Healing hit The New York Times Best Seller list (paperback) in 1989.

Mind Body Spirit magazine ranked him #25 on their 2012 list, "The Spiritual 100".

== Appearances in films and television ==
Siegel was a "key figure" in the 1988 television movie Leap of Faith, later rendered Question of Faith in VHS, written by Bruce Hart.

1n 1992, Frank Perry's autobiographical film On the Bridge shows Perry, with prostate cancer, going to a weekend seminar led by Siegel.

Bernie Siegel appears in the 2012 film "The Cure Is", alongside Bruce H. Lipton, Joel Fuhrman, Fabrizio Mancini, Marianne Williamson, Gregg Braden, Sue Morter, Paul Chek.

== Personal life ==
Siegel lived with his wife Bobbie in Connecticut until she died in her sleep in 2018. They have five adult children. He has said that he reads the Bible often and uses it for inspiration.

== Works ==
=== Books ===
- 1986 – Love, Medicine & Miracles – HarperCollins Publishers, ISBN 978-0060914066
- 1989 – Peace, Love & Healing – HarperCollins Publishers, ISBN 978-0060917050
- 1993 – How to Live Between Office Visits – HarperCollins Publishers, ISBN 978-0060924676
- 1999 – Prescriptions for Living – HarperCollins Publishers, ISBN 978-0060929367
- 2003 – 365 Prescriptions For the Soul – New World Library, ISBN 978-1577314257
- 2003 – Help Me To Heal – Hay House, ISBN 978-1401900373
- 2004 – Smudge Bunny – Children's book – Illustrated by Laura J. Bryant – New World Library/HJ Kramer, ISBN 978-1932073034
- 2006 – Love, Magic, and Mudpies: Raising Your Kids to Feel Loved, Be Kind, and Make a Difference – Rodale Books, ISBN 159486554X
- 2009 – Faith, Hope and Healing: Inspiring Lessons Learned from People Living with Cancer – Wiley, ISBN 978-0470289013
- 2009 – 101 Exercises for the Soul: Simple Practices for a Healthy Body, Mind, and Spirit – New World Library, ISBN 978-1577318521
- 2011 – A Book Of Miracles: Inspiring True Stories of Healing, Gratitude, and Love – New World Library, ISBN 978-1577319689
- 2013 – The Art of Healing: Uncovering Your Inner Wisdom and Potential for Self-Healing – New World Library, ISBN 978-1608681853

=== Recordings ===
- 2004 – Meditations for Peace of Mind (Prescriptions for Living) (Audiobook, CD) – Hay House, ISBN 978-1401903978
- 2006 – Love, Magic, and Mudpies: Raising Your Kids to Feel Loved, Be Kind, and Make a Difference (Audio Edition) – Gildan Media, LLC

=== Films ===
- 1989 – An Evening With Dr. Bernie Siegel – Upstate Media Enterprises
- 1994 – Voices of the New Age – Hartley Film Foundation
- 1995 – Hope and a Prayer: How Hope, Humor and Love Can Heal – Bernie Seigel M.D. – Hay House
- 1997 – Fight for Your Life – Varied Directions/ The Hoffman Collection
- 1996 – Bernie Siegel: How to Live Between Office Visits – Mystic Fire Video
- 1998 – Love Medicine & Miracles – Mystic Fire Video
- 1999 – A Conversation with Bernie Siegel – Wisdom Television
- 2011 – What If?: the Movie – Awakening to Our Unlimited Self – James A. Sinclair documentary
- Bernie Siegel, M.D. – Inner Vision: Visualizing Super Health – Hartley Film Foundation
