= Sunset High School (Texas) =

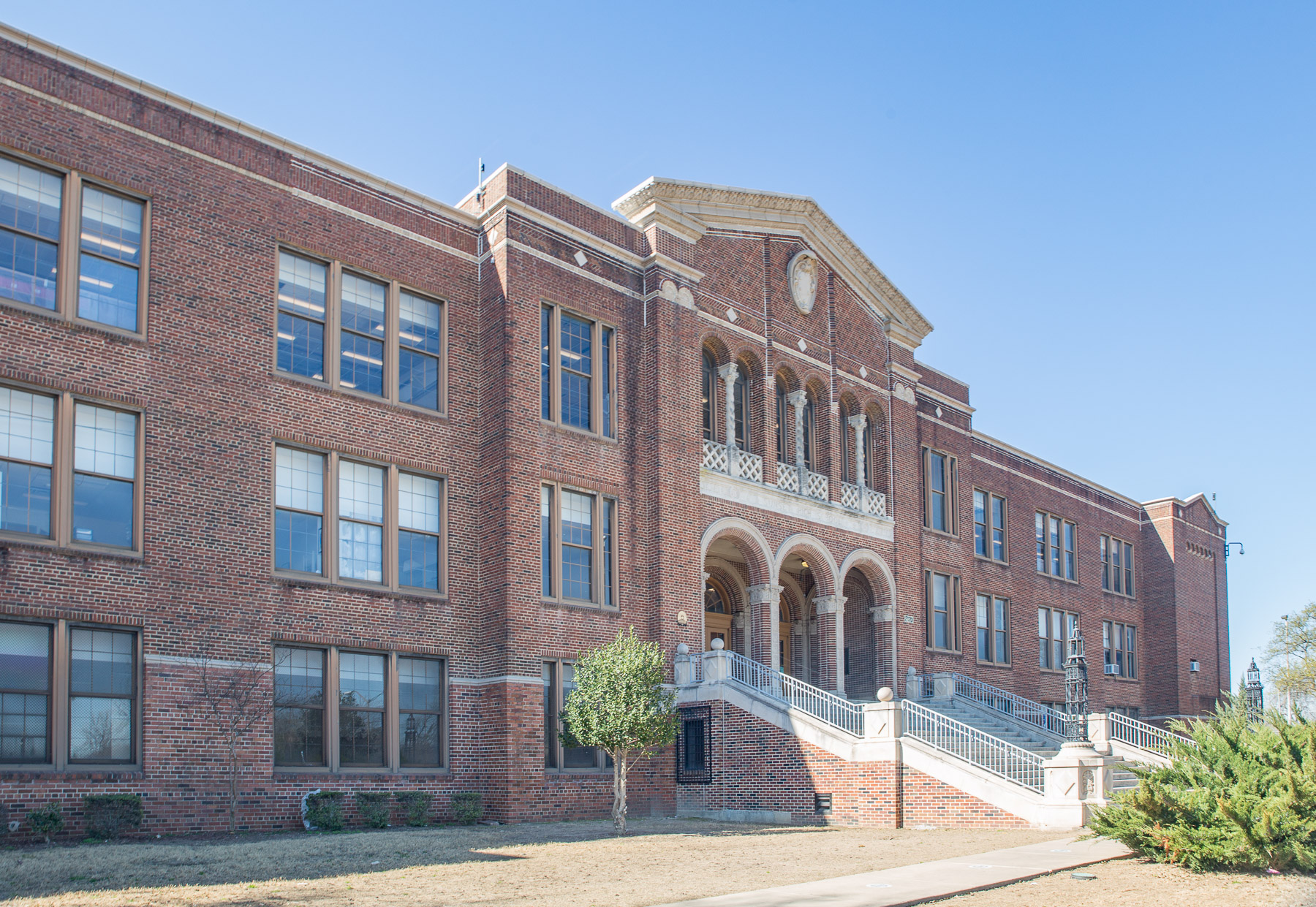
- Sunset High School in 2022

Location
- 2120 W. Jefferson Blvd; Dallas, Texas 75208; United States
- 32°44′48″N 96°51′15″W

Information
- School type: Public, high school
- Motto: Spirit, Knowledge, Friendship
- Established: 1925; 101 years ago
- School district: Dallas Independent School District
- Principal: Jesus F. Martinez
- Teaching staff: 132.33 (FTE) (2023-2024)
- Grades: 9–12
- Enrollment: 2,147 (2023-2024)
- Student to teacher ratio: 16.22 (2023-2024)
- Campus size: 4.6 acres (0.02 km^{2})
- Campus type: Urban
- Colors: Purple; White
- Athletics: Baseball • basketball • cheerleading • cross country • football • golf • soccer • softball • swimming & diving • tennis • track & field • volleyball • wrestling
- Athletics conference: UIL
- Mascot: Bison
- Website: www.dallasisd.org/sunset
- Sunset High School (the United States)

Recorded Texas Historic Landmark
- Designated: 2015
- Reference no.: 18209

Dallas Landmark
- Designated: May 28, 2014
- Reference no.: H/144
- Last updated: February 25, 2019; 7 years ago

Sunset High School is a public secondary school located in the North Oak Cliff area of Dallas, Texas, United States. The school enrolls students in grades 9-12 and is a part of the Dallas Independent School District (DISD). The school serves a portion of the Dallas and Cockrell Hill catchments. In 2015, the school was rated "Met Standard" by the Texas Education Agency.

== History ==
Opened in 1925, Sunset was the second high school in the Oak Cliff area, preceded only by Adamson High School. The origin of the school's name is uncertain; however, it may be due to its location. At the time it opened, Sunset was the westernmost school in the DISD and the subdivision surrounding the school on the western side of Dallas was called "Sunset Heights".

The school opened in 1925 with 1,400 students and 39 teachers as southwest Oak Cliff became increasingly developed. At the time, it was the high school with the largest capacity in DISD; it had the same general architectural plan as Forest Avenue, North Dallas and Oak Cliff (now W. H. Adamson) high schools. Its opening relieved Oak Cliff High of an overcrowding problem.

The mascot is the American bison; it was chosen since early students had to cross open fields to get to school.

In the summer of 2006, Anthony Tovar, a Mexican American raised in Dallas who was previously an assistant principal at W. H. Adamson High School and Moises Molina High School, began work as the principal of Sunset. He gained a reputation of being an excellent principal partly due to his hands-on, involved approach in which he actively communicated with students. In 2013, he planned to resign due to frustration with DISD central office reforms, but he later rescinded his resignation. That year Tovar had been placed on a "growth plan" (a DISD notice asking the principal to improve his school's metrics or face termination). Tovar left DISD in 2013 but stated that he was not forced to resign; in 2015, he returned as an interim assistant principal at Kathlyn Joy Gilliam Collegiate Academy.

In 2009, the school had 155 teachers and 2,200 students.

On May 28, 2014, Sunset High School was designated a Dallas Historical Landmark by vote of the Dallas City Council. The City of Dallas Historical Commission and DISD supported the nomination. In April 2015, the Texas Historical Commission named Sunset High School a Texas Historical Landmark. On September 26, 2015, Sunset High School Celebrated the 90th Anniversary of the school and officially unveiled and dedicated its "Texas Historical Landmark" marker and "Dallas Historical Landmark" marker. It also formally dedicated the Sunset Byron Rhome Football Fieldhouse with a huge ceremony at the school attended by some 700 people.

=== Athletics ===
Until 2021, Sunset was only one of two high schools in the DISD to win a State Football Championship, having won the now-discontinued "Big City" State Championship in 1950 (W. H. Adamson having won the other title in 1924, as Oak Cliff High School). The school was also state runner-up in 1942 and 1949. They were state semi-finalists in 1940, 1941 and 1955. David W. Carter High School won the 1988 Class AAAAA title but was later forced to forfeit the win. In 2021, South Oak Cliff High School broke the drought by winning the 2021 Class 5A Division II state title.

Sunset won the State Basketball Championship in 1944.

Sunset won the State Track and Field Championship in 1953,. Future USA Olympic Silver Medalist Eddie Southern (1956) won four state championships - 120 yard hurdles in 1954 and 1955 and 220 yard (20.7) and 440 yard dash (47.2) in 1955, setting state and national high school records in the latter two. In 1969, Don Randell won both the Shot Put State (67’11.5”) Championship and the mythical National (64’3/4”) Championship at the Golden West Invitational track meet in Sacramento, CA.

The Sunset Golf Team won the state championship in 1938, 1943, 1944, 1945 and 1952. Future PGA Touring Pro and Home Pro at the Oak Cliff Country Club, Earl Stewart, Jr. would win the State Golf Championship in 1937, 1938 and 1939. In 1952, Sunset's Jimmy Powell won the individual state championship in golf.

Sunset also won two state titles in UIL One Act Play in 1944 and 1947.

In 1929, Sanger Brothers Department Store donated the Sanger Trophy to the Dallas Independent School District to be awarded annually to one of the six original DISD High Schools accumulating the most points in athletics. The Sanger Trophy was eventually awarded to Sunset for having won the Trophy more than any other of the Schools. The Sanger Trophy was restored in 2011 and now resides in the Old Red Museum of Dallas Culture and History, representing all six original Dallas High Schools.

== Academic performance ==
In 2006, 53% of the students passed the TAKS math test and 56% passed the science test. In 2008, 57% passed the math test and 62% passed the science test; in 2008, the reading/language arts pass percentage was 82%, and the social studies pass percentage was 91%.

In 2005, the school's graduation rate was 38%. In 2013, it was 57%.

== Feeder patterns ==
As of the 2024-25 school year the school is fed by two middle schools:

- W. E. Greiner Exploratory Arts Academy, fed by:
  - Lida Hooe Elementary School
  - Rosemont Lower School
  - Winnetka Elementary School
- Raul Quintanilla Sr. Middle School STEAM Academy, fed by:
  - Anson Jones Elementary School
  - George Peabody Elementary School
  - Louise Wolff Kahn Elementary School

== Athletics ==
The Sunset Bisons compete in the following sports:

- Baseball
- Basketball
- Cross Country
- Football
- Golf
- Soccer
- Softball
- Swimming and Diving
- Tennis
- Track and Field
- Volleyball
- Wrestling

== Notable alumni ==
- Hank Foldberg, (1944), All America football player at West Point, 1946; member of Sunset 1944 State Championship basketball team
- Dan Foldberg, (1946), Army officer; All-America football player at West Point, 1950
- Louise Latham, (1940), film, television and Broadway actress; "Bonanza"; "Gunsmoke"; Hawaii Five-O"; "Murder, She Wrote"; "Designing Women"; Alfred Hitchcock's "Marnie"; Sanger Trophy Honoree
- Linda Darnell, film actress; co-star with Tyrone Power; "Forever Amber; "Unfaithfully Yours"; "Letter to Three Wives"; star on "Hollywood Walk of Fame"; Sanger Trophy Honoree
- Henry Calvin, (1935), (born Wimberly Goodman), TV actor; played Sergeant Garcia on Disney's TV series "Zorro"
- Earl Stewart, Jr., (1938), professional golfer who played on PGA Tour in 1950s and 1960s; head golf coach at SMU in 1970s and 1980s; only golf pro to ever win a major tournament on his home course
- Don January, (1947), professional golfer; four-time NCAA champion at North Texas State University; winner of 10 PGA Tour titles and 22 Senior Tour events; winner of 1967 PGA Championship; Sanger Trophy Honoree
- Gordon D. Gayle, (1934), Brigadier general in the Marine Corps
- Jerry Rhome, (1960), runner-up for 1964 Heisman Trophy at Tulsa; member of College Football Hall of Fame; played professionally for Cowboys, Browns, Oilers and Rams; coach of Super Bowl XXII champion Washington Redskins; Sanger Trophy Honoree
- Billy Lee Brammer, (1947), journalist and novelist
- Rudy Jaramillo, (1970), played baseball for University of Texas; former hitting coach for Texas Rangers for 15 years, also for Astros and Cubs; Texas Baseball Hall of Fame; Hispanic Heritage Baseball Hall of Fame at Rangers Ballpark in Arlington, Texas
- John Cerminaro, (1965), principal horn player of the New York Philharmonic, Los Angeles Philharmonic, and Seattle Symphony Orchestra
- Terry Southern, (1941), author of Candy, The Magic Christian, and other novels; was screenwriter on Easy Rider, Dr. Strangelove and other notable movies; contributed to scripts on Saturday Night Live in early 1980s; taught writing at NYU and Columbia University in '80s and '90s; class of 1942; died in 1995
- Bill Meeks, (1940), music industry and radio station jingles entrepreneur
- Frank Slay, Jr., (1947), wrote lyrics tossing "Silhouettes" by the Rays; co-wrote "Tallahassie Lassie" by Freddy Cannon; produced "Incense and Peppermint" by The Strawberry Alarm Clock
- Dick Penner, (1955), retired English professor and co-composer of "Ooby Dooby", Roy Orbison's rockabilly classic
- John M. Stemmons, (1927), donated right-of-way for Stemmons Freeway; President, Dallas Citizens Council, Greater Dallas Council of Churches, Dallas County United Fund, Dallas Better Business Bureau, Dallas Real Estate Board and Dallas County Flood Control District; Honorary Consul to Sweden; Linz Award; Sanger Trophy Honoree
- Betty Jameson, (1939), professional golfer, one of founders of Ladies Professional Golf Tour (LPGA); won 13 LPGA titles, including three majors; Sanger Trophy Honoree
- Bettye Mims Danoff, (1940), one of founders of Ladies Professional Golf Tour (LPGA): won 1947 Texas Women's Open title that stopped Babe Didrikson Zaharias' 13 tournament winning streak
- Robert S. Folsom, (1944), Mayor of Dallas; President of Dallas School Board; developer; President of Methodist Hospital Board; Hugh Prather Award; only four-sport letterman in SMU history; Sanger Trophy Honoree
- Davey Williams, (1945), Major League Baseball player; entire career with New York Giants; appeared in 1953 All-Star Game; winner of 1954 World Series; coached for Giants, 1956 and 1957; Texas Baseball Hall of Fame; Sanger Trophy Honoree
- Carl Warwick, (1954), played Major League Baseball for Dodgers, Colt 45's, Orioles, Cubs; Won 1964 World Series with St. Louis Cardinals; tied World Series History with three pinch hits; Texas Baseball Hall of Fame
- Clay Armstrong, PhD, (1952), physiologist; much present knowledge on ion channel structure and function traced to him; Louisa Gross Horwitz Prize; Sanger Trophy Honoree
- Yvonne Craig, (1955), played Batgirl in "Batman" TV series; also roles in "The Many Loves of Dobie Gillis", "The Six Million Dollar Man", "Love American Style", "Star Trek"; appeared with Elvis Presley, Bing Crosby and Dennis Hopper; began career with stint in the Ballet Russe de Monte Carlo
- Eddie Southern, (1955), 1956 Olympic Silver Medalist, 400 Meter Hurdles; 1959 NCAA 440 Yard Champion; Member, University of Texas World Record 440 and 880 Yard Relay Teams; Texas Track and Field Coaches Association Hall of Fame; Sanger Trophy Honoree
- Jerry Mays, (1957), All Southwest Conference at SMU; member of 1962 American Football League champion Dallas Texans; captain of Kansas City Chiefs in Super Bowl I; member of Super Bowl IV championship team; 6-Time All-AFL; All-Time All-AFL team; 1970 NFL Pro Bowl; Sanger Trophy Honoree
- Jack N. James, (1937), assistant director, Jet Propulsion Laboratory of the California Institute of Technology
- Edward Edwards, (1968), actor with minor roles in over 50 television shows since 1974, in series such as "House," "Desperate Housewives," "24," "Commander in Chief" and "CSI: Crime Scene Investigation"
- Mickey Jones, (1959), musician, movie and television actor; drummer for Bob Dylan's World Tour; also for Trini Lopez and Johnny Rivers; numerous film and television credits as a "bad guy"
- Michael Yeargan, (1964), winner of two Tony Awards for "Best Scenic Design in a Musical", "Light in the Piazza", 2005 and "South Pacific", 2008.

== Fundraising ==
The Sunset High School Alumni Association is a 501(c)3 non-profit that raises money in support of teachers, students and the school. The Sunset Foundation is a group of alumni who raise money and award college scholarships to Sunset High School students.

== See also ==
- Recorded Texas Historic Landmarks in Dallas County
- List of Dallas Landmarks
