= Homer Fuller =

American basketball player (1920–2007)

Personal information
- Born: January 9, 1920 Annona, Texas, U.S.
- Died: March 25, 2007 (aged 87) Dallas, Texas, U.S.
- Listed height: 6 ft 3 in (1.91 m)
- Listed weight: 220 lb (100 kg)

Career information
- High school: Annona (Annona, Texas)
- College: East Texas A&M (1939–1942)
- Position: Shooting guard / small forward

Career history

Playing
- 1944–1945: Oshkosh All-Stars

Coaching
- 1945–1954: W. H. Adamson HS

William Homer Fuller (January 9, 1920 – March 25, 2007) was an American professional basketball player. He played in the National Basketball League for the Oshkosh All-Stars during the 1944–45 season averaged 5.3 points per game. At East Texas A&M University he played basketball and tennis.

After college, Fuller tried to join the Navy but was denied due to vascular problems in his legs. He became a school teacher in the Dallas, Texas area while also coaching and refereeing high school basketball and football. He moved up the ranks in education to become a Deputy Assistant Superintendent, retiring in 1981. Fuller also refereed collegiately for the Missouri Valley Conference and holds the distinction of being on the officiating crew of the first college football game in the Houston Astrodome.
