= Midland College =

Public college in Midland, Texas, U.S.

Midland College (MC)
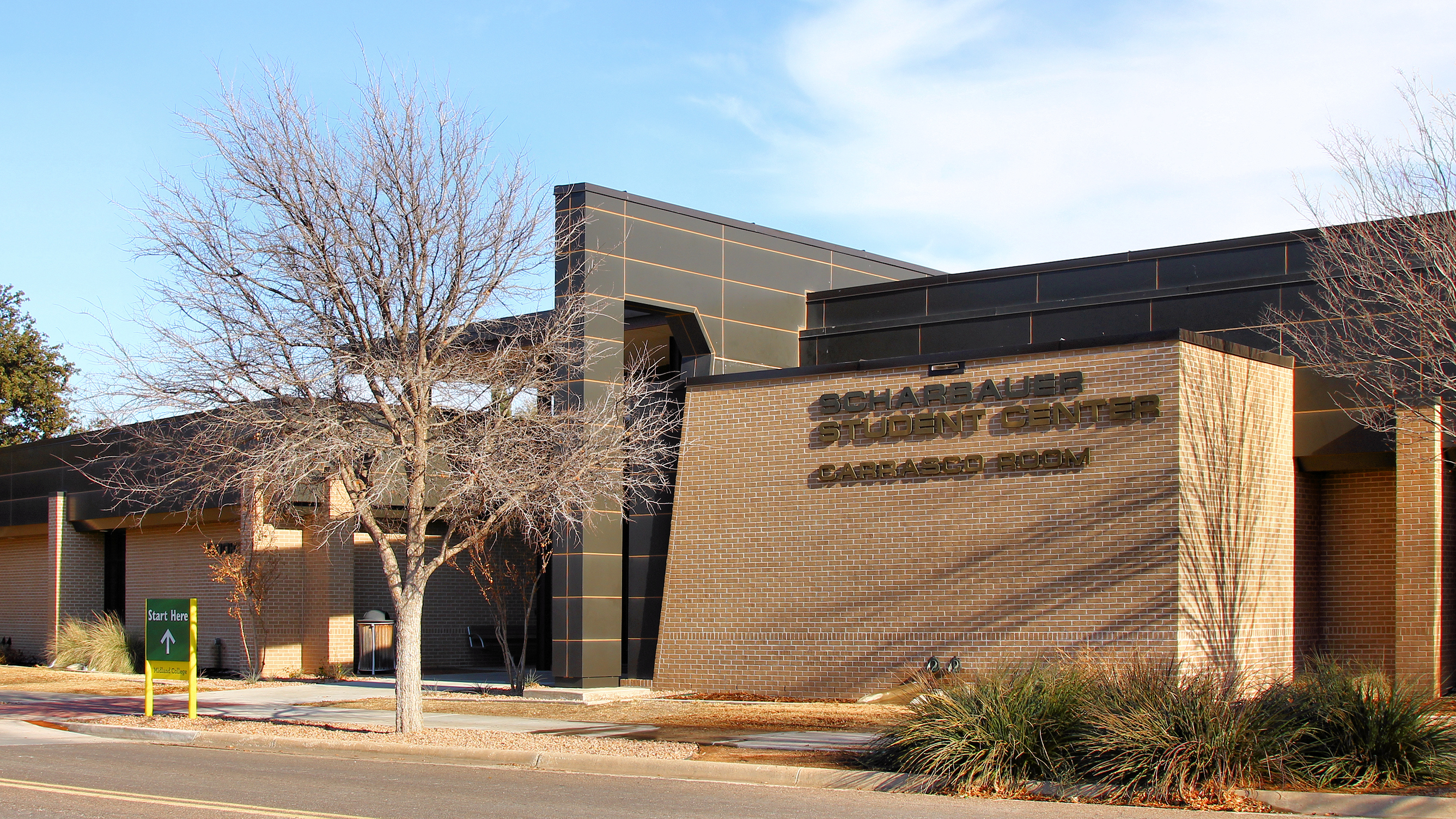
- The Scharbauer Student Center at Midland College.
- Type: Public community college
- Established: 1972
- President: Damon Kennedy
- Students: 7,281
- Location: Midland, Texas, U.S. 32.0291°N 102.1053°W
- Campus: 224 acres (91 ha)
- Colors: Green and yellow
- Nickname: Chaps
- Sporting affiliations: NJCAA Division I
- Mascot: Chaparral
- Website: www.midland.edu
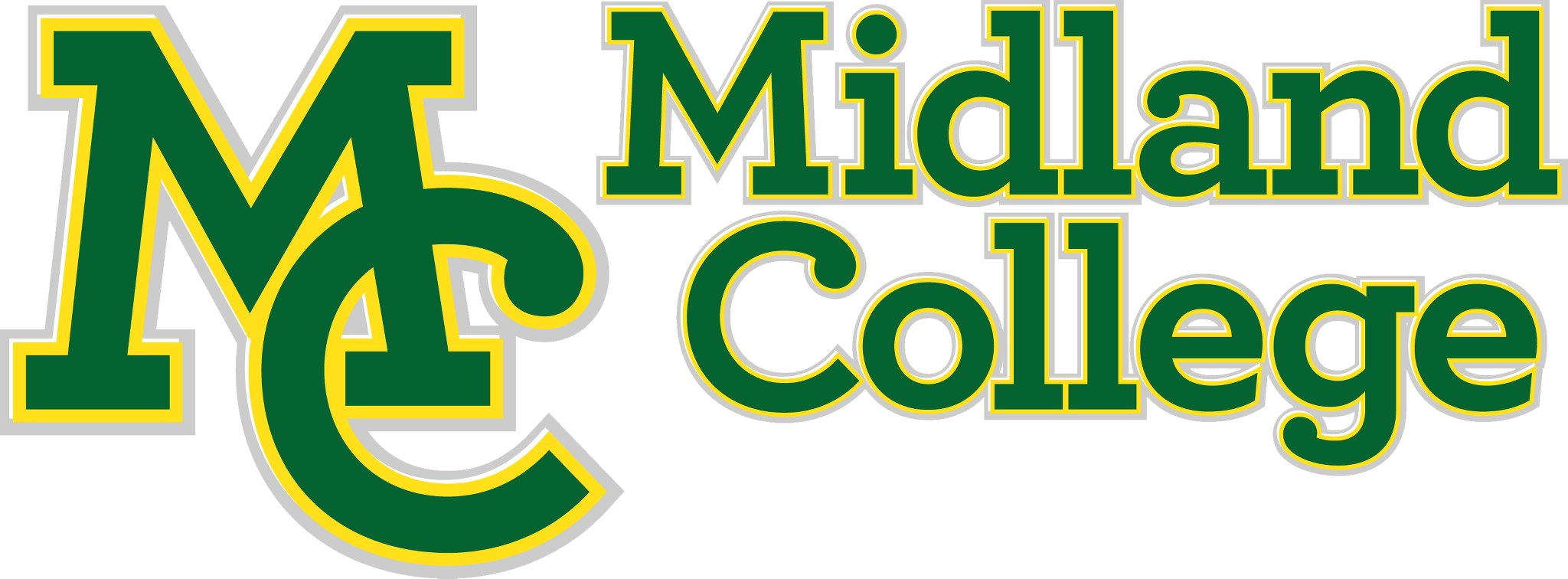

Midland College (MC) is a public community college in Midland, Texas, United States. It was established as an independent junior college in 1972 and held its first classes on campus in 1975. Since that time, the campus has expanded to a 704,752-square-foot (65,473.6 m^{2}) main campus on 224 acres (0.91 km^{2}) in Midland. It also has numerous locations in other parts of Midland and in Fort Stockton, the Pecos County seat.

== History ==
Midland College began in September 1969 as the Midland campus of the Permian Junior College system. It was recreated in 1972 with the formation of the Midland College District.

== Service area ==
As defined by the Texas Legislature, the official service area of Midland College is all of Crockett, Midland, Pecos, Reagan, and Terrell counties.

== Campus ==
=== Main campus ===
Following the formation of the Midland College District in 1972, bonds in the amount of $5,100,000 were issued for the construction of a 115-acre (0.47 km^{2}) campus. Groundbreaking at the new campus was held October 23, 1973.

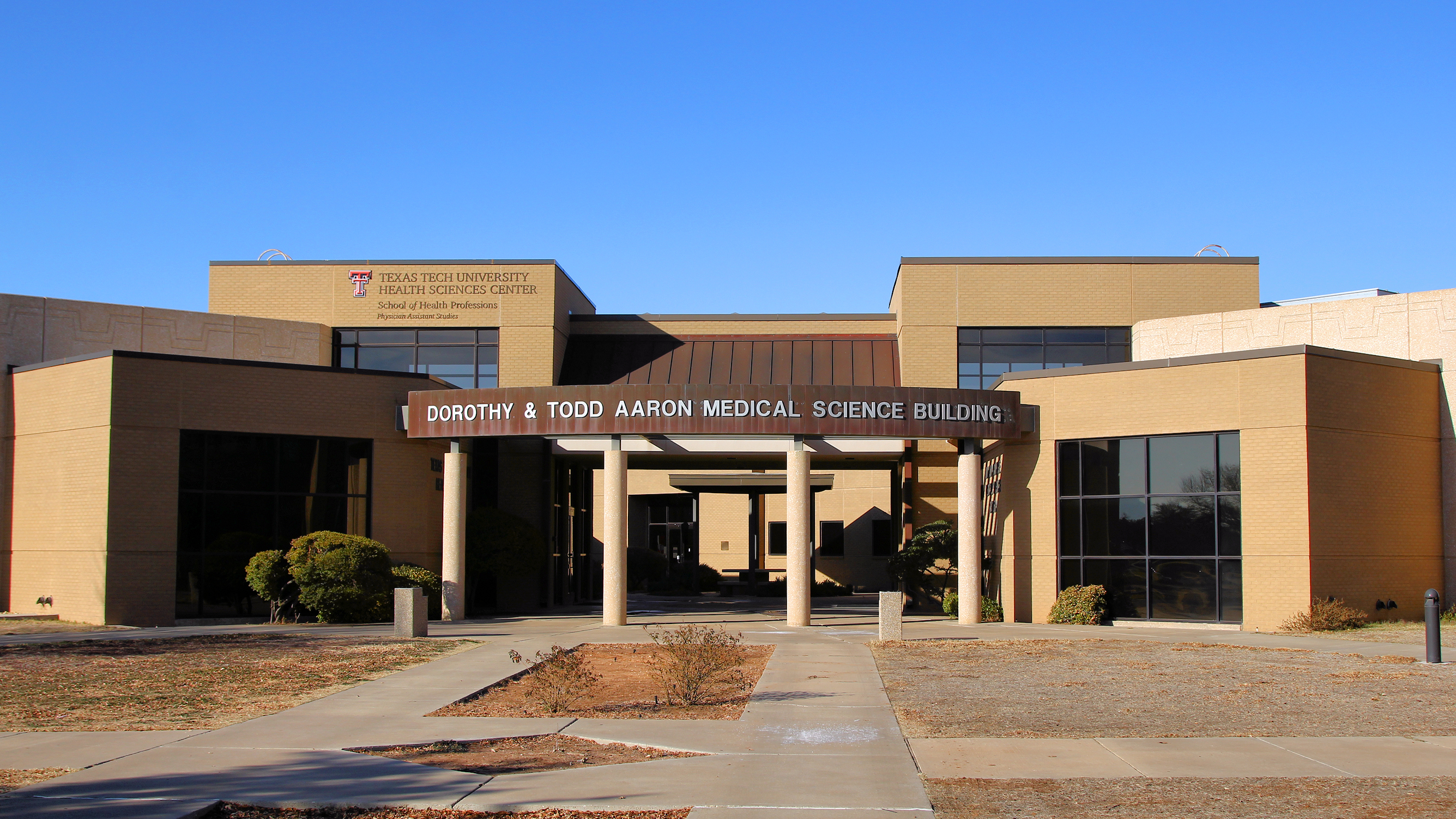
The Dorothy and Todd Aaron Medical Science Building

Opened in the spring of 1975:

- Pevehouse Administration Building
- Abell-Hanger Science Faculty Building

Opened in the fall of 1975:

- Murray Fasken Learning Resource Center
- Dorothy and Clarence Scharbauer Jr. Student Center
- Technology Center
- Physical Education Building

Opened in 1978:

- Allison Fine Arts Building
- Al G. Langford Chaparral Center

Opened in the following years:

- Davidson Family Health Sciences Building
- Dolly Neal Chapel
- Dorothy and Todd Aaron Medical Science Building
- F. Marie Hall Academic Building
- Helen L. Greathouse Children's Center
- Jack E. Brown Dining Hall
- Leona G. and John E. Fox Science Building

Also, four residence halls are on the Midland College main campus (see below).

=== Off-campus facilities ===
- The Advanced Technology Center, located at 3200 W. Cuthbert in Midland, delivers workforce education programs that support the development of a skilled technical workforce for Midland and the Permian Basin. The facility contains more than 80,000 square feet (7,400 m^{2}) of instructional space that features high-tech computer classrooms with Internet access and a tiered lecture hall.
- The Aviation Maintenance Technology Facility, located at Midland International Airport, Hangar E, 2405 Windecker, offers students training on actual aircraft as they work towards certification in airframe maintenance and powerplant maintenance.
- The Bill Pace Cogdell Learning Center, located at 201 W. Florida, provides ABE, ESL, and GED courses, and houses the MC Business and Economic Development Center.
- The Petroleum Professional Development Center, located at 3600 N. Garfield, Jack E. Brown Conference Center, provides continuing education for the Permian Basin energy industries.
- The Williams Regional Technical Training Center, located at 1309 West I-10 in Fort Stockton, provides university parallel, occupational/technical certificate and associate degree programs, and courses offered in collaboration with the Fort Stockton Independent School District.

== Academics ==
The college offers 100+ degree and certificate programs, as well as a variety of continuing education programs. It also offers a bachelor's degree in organizational management and provides on-campus access to upper-level degrees offered at seven University Center partners.

Midland College is accredited by the Commission on Colleges of the Southern Association of Colleges and Schools to award certificates and associate and baccalaureate degrees. It is also approved by the Texas Higher Education Coordinating Board.

=== University Center ===
The Midland College University Center offers students several options for either beginning or completing their education. Programs and courses are now offered by seven area and online universities: Texas Tech University, Lubbock Christian University, the University of Texas of the Permian Basin, Sul Ross State University, Angelo State University, Howard Payne University, and Western Governors University. Midland College offers more than fifty associate degree and certificate options plus a Bachelor of Applied Technology in Organizational Management and Bachelor of Applied Science in Health Services Management.

=== Early College High School ===
Early College High School (ECHS) at Midland College is located on the main campus in the Allison Fine Arts Building. The school welcomed its first freshman class on August 24, 2009. The goal for ECHS is that by the time "the students receive their high school diploma, they will also have an associate's degree from Midland College." In 2022, ECHS @ MC was designated a National Blue Ribbon School.

== Special designations ==
In 2010, Midland College became the first institution in West Texas and the fourth community college in the nation to be designated an All-Steinway School.

In 2013, Midland College became the first community college to be designated a Conn-Selmer School.

== Student life ==
Clubs, intramural sports, cheerleading, student government, and all other student-related activities operate through the Student Activities Office.

=== Residence halls ===
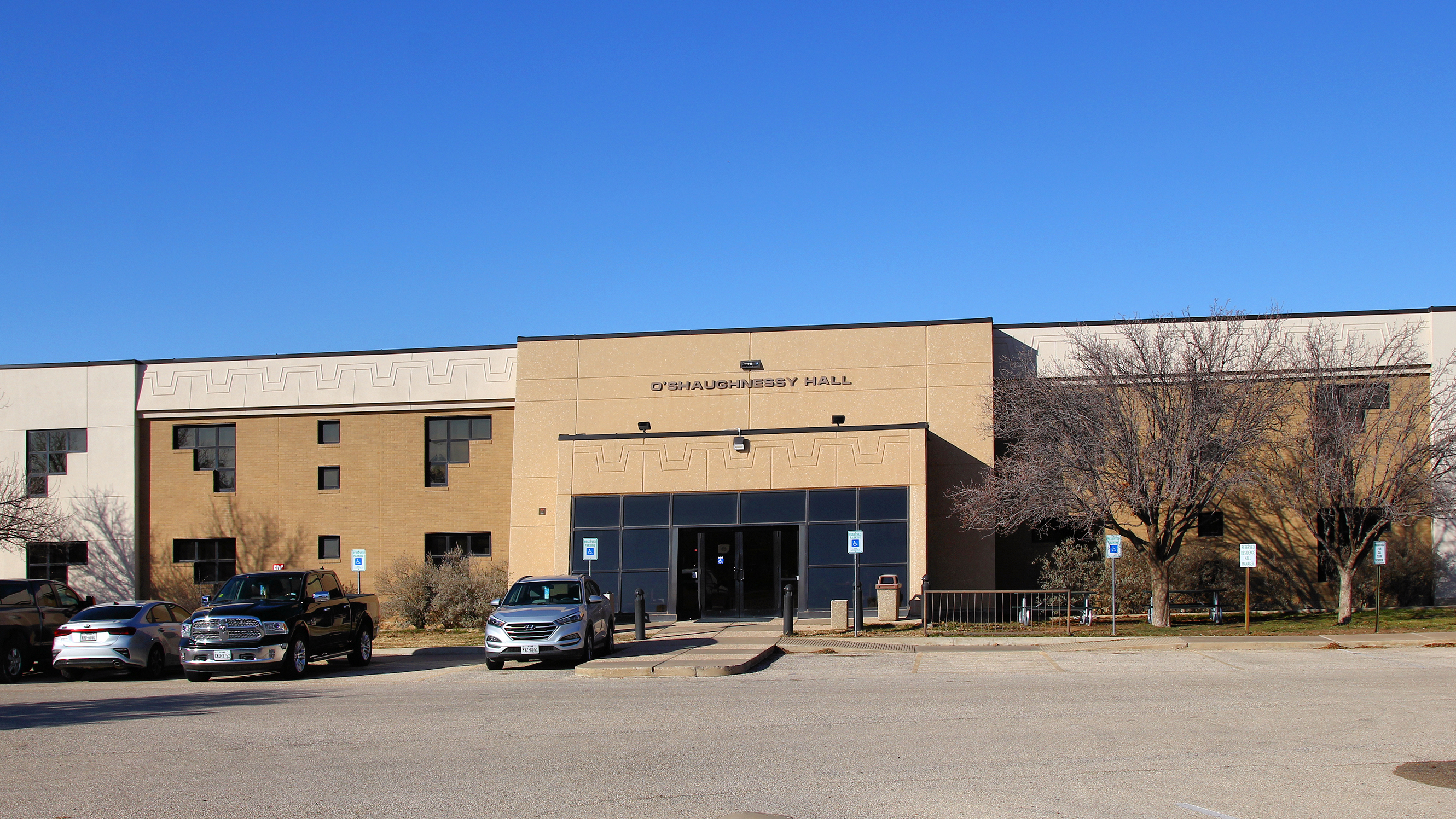
O'Shaughnessy Hall

The main campus has three residence halls for students: O'Shaughnessy Hall, Nadine and Tom Craddick Hall, and David E. Daniel Residence Hall.

=== Student publications ===
- Chaparral - The MC student news/feature magazine is published once each year, during the spring semester.
- Tableau - The MC student literary magazine is published once each year during the fall semester.

The student publications office at Midland College also maintains its own website (see below, in External Links)

== Athletics ==
The Midland College Chaparrals have won 21 National Championships in sports since 1975, as well as produced 192 All-Americans. A member of the Western Junior College Athletic Conference, Midland College fields teams in:

- Baseball
- Men's basketball
- Women's basketball
- Men's golf
- Softball
- Volleyball

The college's mascot is a Chaparral.

== Notable alumni ==
- Jerome Beasley, basketball player
- Mookie Blaylock, basketball player, NBA All-Star
- Anatoli Boisa, basketball player for the national team of Georgia (country).
- Chad Campbell, professional golfer
- Tucker Davidson, baseball pitcher
- Kenneth Ferrie, English professional golfer with multiple wins on European PGA Tour
- Daeshon Francis (born 1996), basketball player in the Israeli Basketball Premier League
- Ricky Grace, American-Australian basketball player, NBL Hall of Famer (Perth Wildcats)
- Nathan Jawai, Australian basketball player (Galatasaray)
- Nyaduoth Lok, basketball player
- Milt Palacio, basketball player
- Spud Webb, basketball player, 1986 NBA Slam Dunk Contest champion
- Jonathon Simmons, NBA player for Orlando Magic
- Darrell Williams (born 1989), basketball player for Hapoel Tel Aviv of the Israeli Premier League
