= Cockrell Hill, Texas =

City of Cockrell Hill, Texas
- City
- Location of Cockrell Hill in Dallas County, Texas
- Coordinates: 32°44′17″N 96°53′19″W
- Country: United States
- State: Texas
- County: Dallas

Area
  - Total: 0.58 sq mi (1.51 km^{2})
  - Land: 0.58 sq mi (1.51 km^{2})
  - Water: 0 sq mi (0.00 km^{2})
- Elevation: 630 ft (190 m)

Population (2020)
  - Total: 3,815
  - Density: 6,540/sq mi (2,530/km^{2})
- Time zone: UTC-6 (CST)
  - Summer (DST): UTC-5 (CDT)
- ZIP code: 75211
- Area codes: 214, 469, 945, 972
- FIPS code: 48-15796
- GNIS feature ID: 2409498
- Website: https://cityofcockrellhill.us/

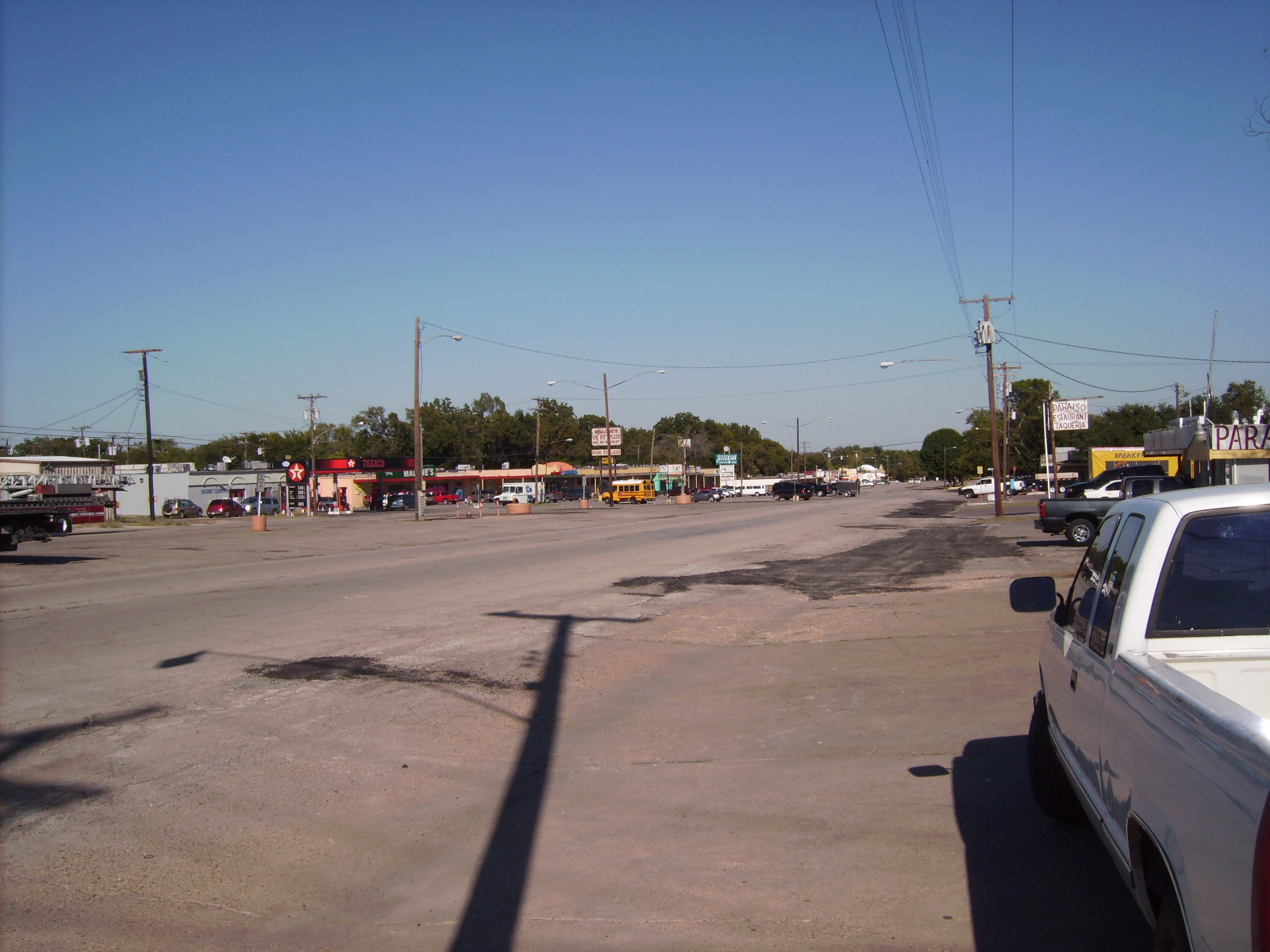
Jefferson Boulevard, the main commercial street in Cockrell Hill

Cockrell Hill is an enclave city in Dallas County, Texas, United States. The population was 4,193 at the 2010 census, and 3,815 in 2020. It is completely surrounded by the city of Dallas and is part of the Dallas–Fort Worth metroplex.

== History ==
Cockrell Hill was established by the pioneer Brentwood Allen Cockrell and his son, Woodrow. They established the town as a way of making a living, and ran it like a business. The Cockrell place was known to travelers on the stage line that ran from Dallas to Fort Belknap and on to El Paso and the west. The settlement developed as an agricultural crossroads and by the late 1800s had a few scattered homes, a small store, and a school. Water became the overriding issue for the town's continued growth. Frank Jester, a local developer, laid out the plan for the modern community of Cockrell Hill in 1911. A first attempt at incorporation in 1925 proved unsuccessful, and the following year a vote to disincorporate was approved. The second incorporation passed on July 21, 1937, when the population was 459. The town grew to a population of 1,246 in 1941. Many of the new residents worked in war-related industries located in the surrounding areas. In 1952 the population was 2,194, in 1990 it was 3,916, and in 2000 it was 4,445. In May 2006, Councilman Luis D. Carrera defeated C. P. Slayton and John Mendiola defeated Richard Hall and joined Silvia Ulloa, Richard Perez and Sammy Rodriquez to become the first all-Hispanic City Council in North Texas.

== Geography ==
According to the United States Census Bureau, the city has a total area of 0.6 square miles (1.6 km^{2}), all land.

== Demographics ==
Historical population
Census	Pop.	Note	%±
1940	1,246		—
1950	2,207		77.1%
1960	3,104		40.6%
1970	3,515		13.2%
1980	3,262		−7.2%
1990	3,746		14.8%
2000	4,443		18.6%
2010	4,193		−5.6%
2020	3,815		−9.0%
U.S. Decennial Census

=== 2020 census ===
As of the 2020 census, there were 3,815 people and 965 families residing in the city.

The median age was 32.6 years. 28.5% of residents were under the age of 18 and 10.2% of residents were 65 years of age or older. For every 100 females there were 108.1 males, and for every 100 females age 18 and over there were 105.2 males age 18 and over.

100.0% of residents lived in urban areas, while 0% lived in rural areas.

There were 1,063 households in Cockrell Hill, of which 51.3% had children under the age of 18 living in them. Of all households, 51.6% were married-couple households, 18.2% were households with a male householder and no spouse or partner present, and 22.8% were households with a female householder and no spouse or partner present. About 12.9% of all households were made up of individuals and 4.7% had someone living alone who was 65 years of age or older.

There were 1,136 housing units, of which 6.4% were vacant. Among occupied housing units, 55.9% were owner-occupied and 44.1% were renter-occupied. The homeowner vacancy rate was 0.2% and the rental vacancy rate was 5.4%.

Racial composition as of the 2020 census
Race	Number	Percent
White	717	18.8%
Black or African American	70	1.8%
American Indian and Alaska Native	74	1.9%
Asian	16	0.4%
Native Hawaiian and Other Pacific Islander	1	<0.1%
Some other race	1,788	46.9%
Two or more races	1,149	30.1%
Hispanic or Latino (of any race)	3,513	92.1%

== Education ==
=== Primary and secondary schools ===
Dallas Independent School District serves students in Cockrell Hill. All of the schools serving Cockrell Hill are in the City of Dallas.

As of 2024, a portion is zoned to Celestino Mauricio Soto Jr. Elementary School, L. V. Stockard Middle School, and Moisés E. Molina High School. Parts of southern Cockrell Hill are served by L. O. Donald Elementary School, Zan Wesley Holmes Middle School, and Kimball High School. Parts of northern Cockrell Hill are served by Anson Jones Elementary School, Quintanilla Middle School, and Sunset High School.

There is a private Catholic K–8 school adjacent to Cockrell Hill, Mount Saint Michael Catholic School, established in 1986 as Prince of Peace Christian School, renamed to in 1990 to Prince of Peace Community School and serving as a non-diocesan private school since 1995. It received its current name on July 1, 2007, to avoid confusion with other area schools with the same name.

=== Community colleges ===
All of Dallas County (Cockrell Hill included) is in the service area of Dallas College (formerly Dallas County Community College). Dallas College operates Mountain View College, located near Cockrell Hill in Dallas.

== Public safety ==
Law enforcement is carried out by the Cockrell Hill Police Department, which employs paid and reserve sworn police officers. The current police chief is Daryle Ryan.

The Cockrell Hill Police Department has suffered one line of duty death. On May 30, 1999, Police Officer Tiffany Hickey died six days after she sustained injuries in a motor vehicle collision during pursuit of a suspect. Officer Hickey was the passenger in the patrol car, being driven by her field training officer (FTO), when they attempted to stop a vehicle for speeding and running a red light. Officer Hickey radioed dispatch to notify them of the chase but, due to an antiquated radio system, dispatch never heard the call because another officer was transmitting. Approximately three minutes later the FTO swerved to avoid another vehicle in an intersection and struck a light pole. Officer Hickey remained in serious condition before succumbing to her injuries. Officer Hickey had served with the agency for only 1 month.

Fire safety is regulated by the all-volunteer Cockrell Hill Fire Department, which contracts its emergency ambulance services to the Dallas Fire Department.

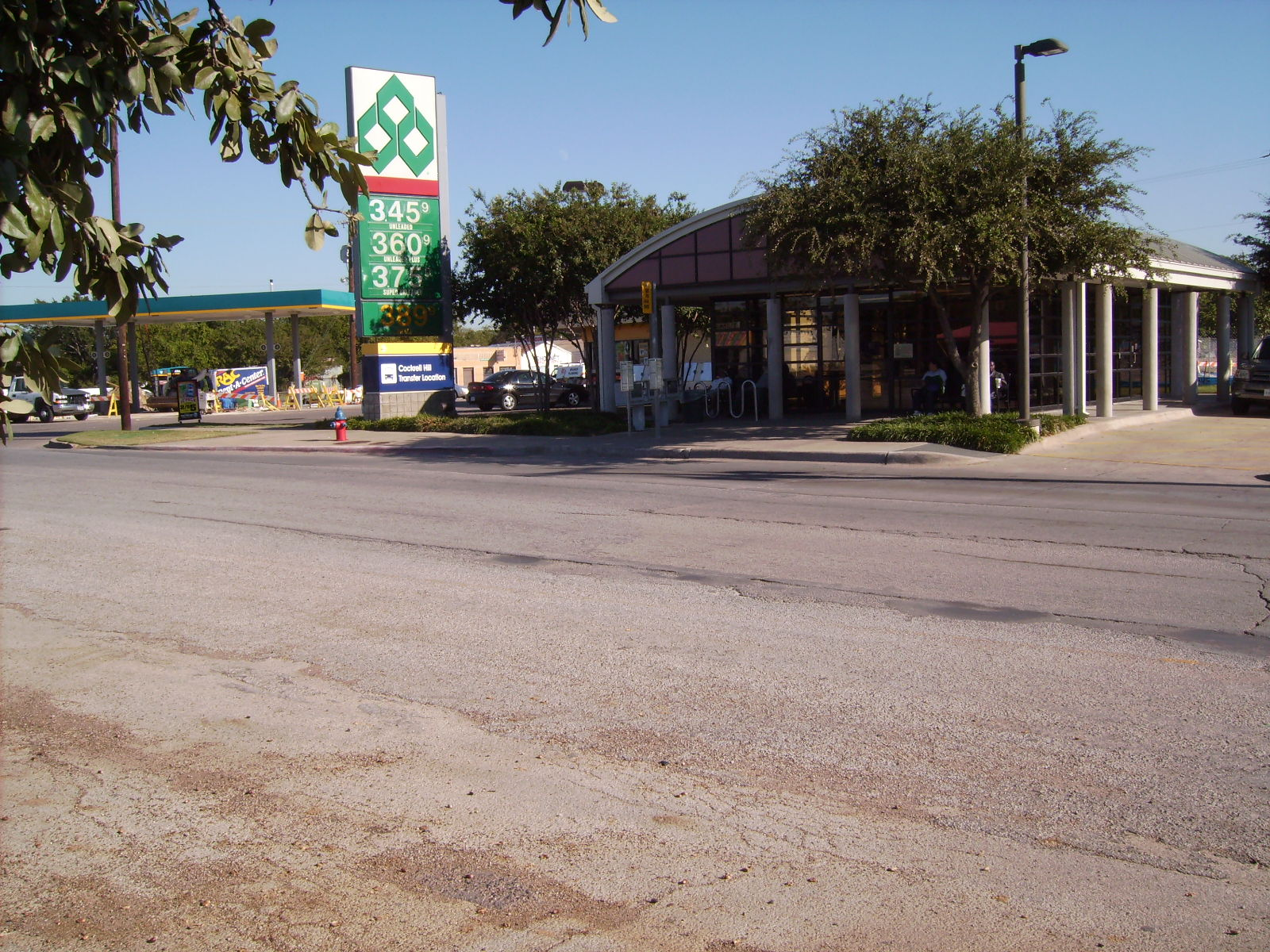
Cockrell Hill Transfer Location

== Transportation ==
Cockrell Hill can be reached by several bus lines in the Dallas Area Rapid Transit system. The main bus stop is the Cockrell Hill Transfer Location.
