= Elda Vokel =

American actress

Elda Voelkel
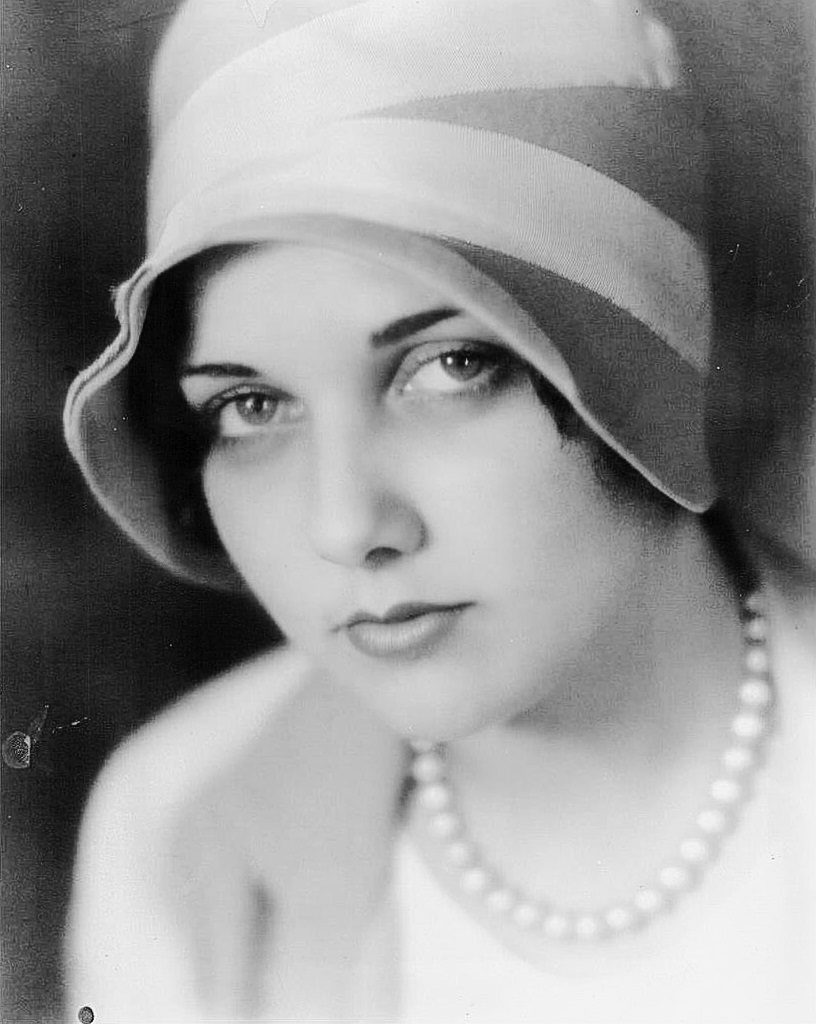
- Vokel in 1929
- Born: March 6, 1911; Brownwood, Texas, U.S.
- Died: March 6, 2001 (aged 90); Greenwich, Connecticut, U.S.
- Other name: Elda Vokel
- Spouses: William Keighley (m. 1931; div. 1936) Charles Irving Hartley (m. 1940; died 1986)

Elda Voelkel (sometimes spelled "Vokel") Hartley (March 6, 1911 – March 6, 2001) was an American stage and motion picture actress. Following a brief career as a Hollywood actress, which lasted from 1930 to 1932 and during which she accumulated four screen credits, Voelkel married filmmaker Irving Hartley, with whom she produced numerous documentary films on a wide range of subjects. In 1976, she created the Hartley Film Foundation, which was dedicated to promoting greater understanding of religion and spirituality.

== Early life and education ==
Emily Elda Voelkel, the daughter of Leonidas ("L.C." or "Leo") and Emily (Lockwood) Voelkel, was born in Brownwood, Texas, and grew up in McKinney and Dallas. She graduated from Oak Cliff High School in Dallas. Voelkel gained experience at the Little Theater in Dallas and studied expression. She enjoyed sketching and once entertained the dual ambition of becoming an artist and a novelist. She spent two years studying at Southern Methodist University, before departing for New York City to attend drama school.

== Career ==
Voelkel appeared on Broadway in the comedy The Greeks Had a Word for It, in 1931. In June of that year she came to Santa Barbara, California with a troupe. Dorothy Hall and Wanda Lyon co-starred with her in the play which was written by Zoë Akins. The Belasco and Curran show also featured Armand Kallz and Montagu Love.

The Fox Film Corporation signed Voelkel to a contract after she played two ingenue theatrical roles in New York City. Her first assignment was Bad Girl. However, she lost the part because of objections regarding her southern accent. She was cast in bit parts in The Vagabond King (1930), Only The Brave (1930), and had an uncredited role in She Wanted A Millionaire (1932).

Voelkel returned to the New York stage prior to reentering motion pictures. She was temporarily given the feminine lead, opposite Warner Oland, in Charlie Chan's Chance (1932). Before filming began she was replaced by Marian Nixon. Her final film role was in The First Year (1932). The movie starred Charles Farrell and Janet Gaynor. Directed by William K. Howard, the romantic comedy was taken from a popular farce, penned by Frank Craven.

Following the end of her acting career and her 1940 marriage to filmmaker Irving Hartley, Voelkel (thereafter known as Elda Hartley) began producing documentary films, including newsreels and travelogues, with her husband. Beginning in 1965, she turned to world religions and spirituality as the primary subject matter of her films, and to that end she co-founded the Hartley Film Foundation. She died in 2001, on her 90th birthday.

== Personal life ==
In 1931, Voelkel began a romantic relationship with William Keighley. He was the Belasco stage director who selected her for the role of Polaire in The Greeks Had A Word For It. Keighley and Voelkel married in 1931 and were later divorced in October 1936. In 1940, Voelkel married Charles Irving Hartley (1902–1986).

Voelkel died on her 90th birthday in Greenwich, Connecticut.
