= East Texas A&M Lions men's basketball =

2026–27 East Texas A&M Lions men's basketball team
- University: East Texas A&M University
- First season: 1916–17 (110 years ago)
- History: East Texas Normal Normalites (1916–1917); East Texas State Normal Normalites (1917–1919); East Texas State Normal Lions (1919–1923); East Texas State Teachers Lions (1923–1957); East Texas State Lions (1957–1996); Texas A&M–Commerce Lions (1996–2024)
- Head coach: Jaret von Rosenberg (10th season)
- Location: Commerce, Texas
- Arena: The Field House (capacity: 3,055)
- Conference: Southland Conference
- Nickname: Lions
- Colors: Blue and gold
- All-time record: 1,382–1,082 (.561)

NCAA Division II tournament Elite Eight
- 1997, 2005

NCAA Division II tournament appearances
- 1996, 1997, 1998, 2005, 2015, 2017, 2018, 2019, 2022

NAIA tournament champions
- 1955
Other NAIA tournament results
Semifinals	1953, 1955, 1978
Quarterfinals	1953, 1954, 1955, 1958, 1977, 1978
Appearances	1939, 1940, 1942, 1948, 1949, 1950, 1953, 1954, 1955, 1958, 1964, 1974, 1977, 1978, 1979

Conference tournament champions
- Lone Star: 1977, 1978, 2005, 2015

Conference regular-season champions
- Lone Star: 1934, 1936, 1939, 1940, 1942, 1948, 1950, 1953, 1954, 1955, 1957, 1958, 1964, 1974, 1975, 1977, 1978, 1984, 1990, 1996, 1998, 2005, 2020

Uniforms
Home	Away	Alternate

For information on all East Texas A&M University sports, see East Texas A&M Lions

The East Texas A&M Lions men's basketball team (formerly the East Texas State Lions and the Texas A&M–Commerce Lions) is the men's intercollegiate basketball program representing East Texas A&M University. The school competes in the Southland Conference (SLC) in Division I of the National Collegiate Athletic Association (NCAA). The team plays its home games at the University Field House on the university campus in Commerce, Texas. They are currently coached by Jaret von Rosenberg.

The Lions were members of the National Association for Intercollegiate Basketball (NAIB) from 1940 to 1952, the National Association of Intercollegiate Athletics (NAIA) from 1952 to 1982, and joined the NCAA for the 1982–83 season. Between 1982 and 2022, the team competed in the Lone Star Conference of Division II. In 2022, the team joined the Southland Conference in the Division I.

The Lions won one NAIA National Championship in the 1954–55 season, 21 Lone Star Conference Championships, and have made National Playoff tournaments 24 times, 15 as a member of the NAIA and 9 as a member of Division II.

== History ==
=== Early years and NAIB membership ===
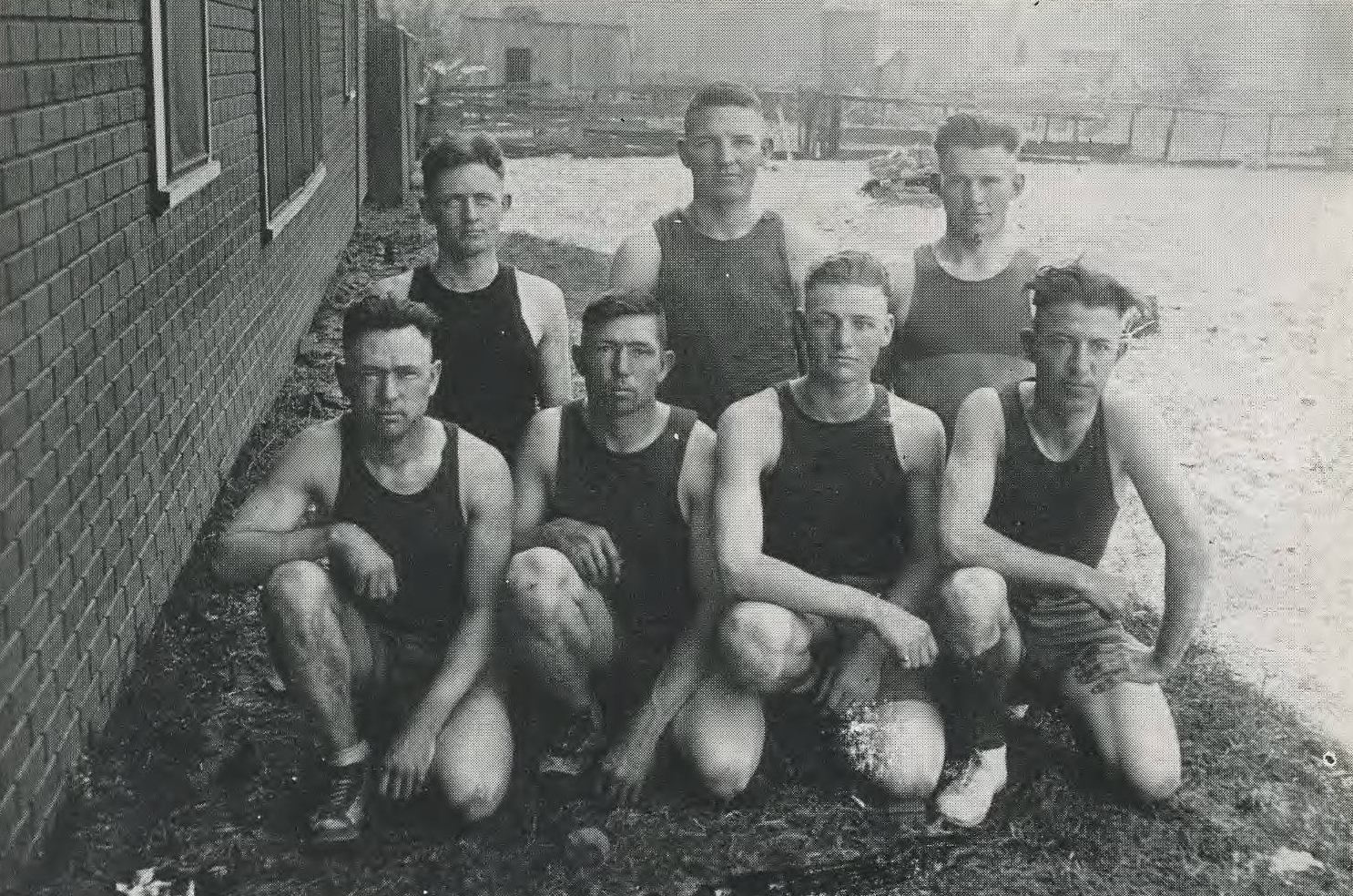
The East Texas State men's basketball team in 1920

The men's team was formed in 1916, and then joined the Lone Star Conference (LSC) in 1931 and won their first conference championship under Jules V. Sikes in 1934. Sikes left Commerce to become head football coach at the University of Kansas and returned to Commerce in 1954 as head football coach. Sikes was replaced by S. J. Petty, who led the Lions to an LSC title in 1936. Dennis Vinzant became head coach in 1937 and the team saw its first national tournament in 1940 as they were invited to the NAIB national tournament in Kansas City, losing in the first round to Pittsburg State, 55–33.

=== Joining the NAIA ===
The Lions joined the National Association of Intercollegiate Athletics (NAIA) for basketball for the 1940–1941 season. Due to World War II breaking out, seasons in the mid 1940s were either shortened or cancelled, and Vinzent stopped coaching basketball after the 1945 season after notching a 92–60 record and two Lone Star Conference Championships. Darrell Tully assumed head coaching duties and led the Lions to a conference title in 1948 and two appearances in the NAIA postseason playoffs. Milburn Smith led the team to the NAIA National Tournament in 1950 and conference title before becoming the head football coach at the university and having tremendous success. Jack Woodruff coached for one season in 1951 before leaving.

=== Championships under Bob Rogers ===
Bob Rogers arrived in Commerce in 1952 and from 1952 to 1956, the Lions had an immense amount of success. Rogers amassed a record of 113–34, Conference Championships in 1953, 1954, and 1955. Additionally, the program went to the NAIA National Tournament all of those years as well. The 1953 team finished in NAIA Final Four, losing to Hamline College and then losing the National third place game to Indiana State University by 3 points. In the 1954 tournament, the Lions defeated North Texas, Portland State, and Geneva College before losing to Southwest Missouri State in overtime. Entering the 1955 tournament, ET finally broke through by sailing through the tournament and defeating Southeastern Oklahoma State University 71–54 in the National Championship Game. It was the final time the Lions would make the National tournament under Rogers, despite having winning records in 1956 and a conference title in 1957 before leaving Commerce to become head coach for Texas A&M University.

=== Norman Pilgrim era ===
Norman Pilgrim became head coach and the Lions had another run of success under his tenure. Pilgrim coached from 1957 to 1967 and he won two Lone Star Conference Championships in 1958 and 1964. The team returned to the NAIA Elite 8 in 1958. In 1964 ET qualified for the postseason yet again, but lost in the NAIA District playoff to St. Mary's. In 1966, the Lions played Texas Western University's (now The University of Texas at El Paso) historic color barrier breaking team. The game was featured in the Walt Disney film Glory Road. This caused controversy as in the film, the East Texas squad and fans were shown to be very hostile to the Texas Western Black players. In reality, the Lions suited up 3 Black players and the game was played in El Paso and resulted in a 73-51 Miner win, rather than the close and tense affair played in Commerce. Pilgrim amassed a 152–126 record before retiring.

=== Jim Gudger years ===
From 1969 to 1982, Jim Gudger coached the Lions with mostly successful seasons. The team had won the Lone Star Conference 3 times (1974, 1977, 1978) and were selected for the National Tournament times as well. Losing in the first round in 1974, Gudger's 1977 team went to the Elite 8, where they bowed out to Texas Southern. In 1978 the team lost to eventual National Champion Quincy in the NAIA final four, and lost in the first round to St. Mary's in 1979. Gudger retired in 1982 after winning 202 games, second most in program history. 1982 was also the final year the Lions would compete in the NAIA.

=== NCAA membership & Jerry Matthews/Paul Peak years ===
In 1982, the East Texas State and Lone Star Conference left the NAIA and joined the NCAA. Jerry Matthews coached from 1983 to 1990, winning 99 games and winning conference championships in 1984 and 1990. Paul Peak coached team from 1991 to 1999. Under Peak, the Lions won the LSC in 1996 and 1998. The team went to the NCAA tournament for the first time since joining the NCAA in 1996, losing to Central Missouri in the First Round. In 1997 the Lions qualified for the NCAA Elite 8 before losing to Northern Kentucky. In 1998 the Lions returned to the NCAA tournament for the third straight year, losing in the first round.

=== Sam Walker era ===
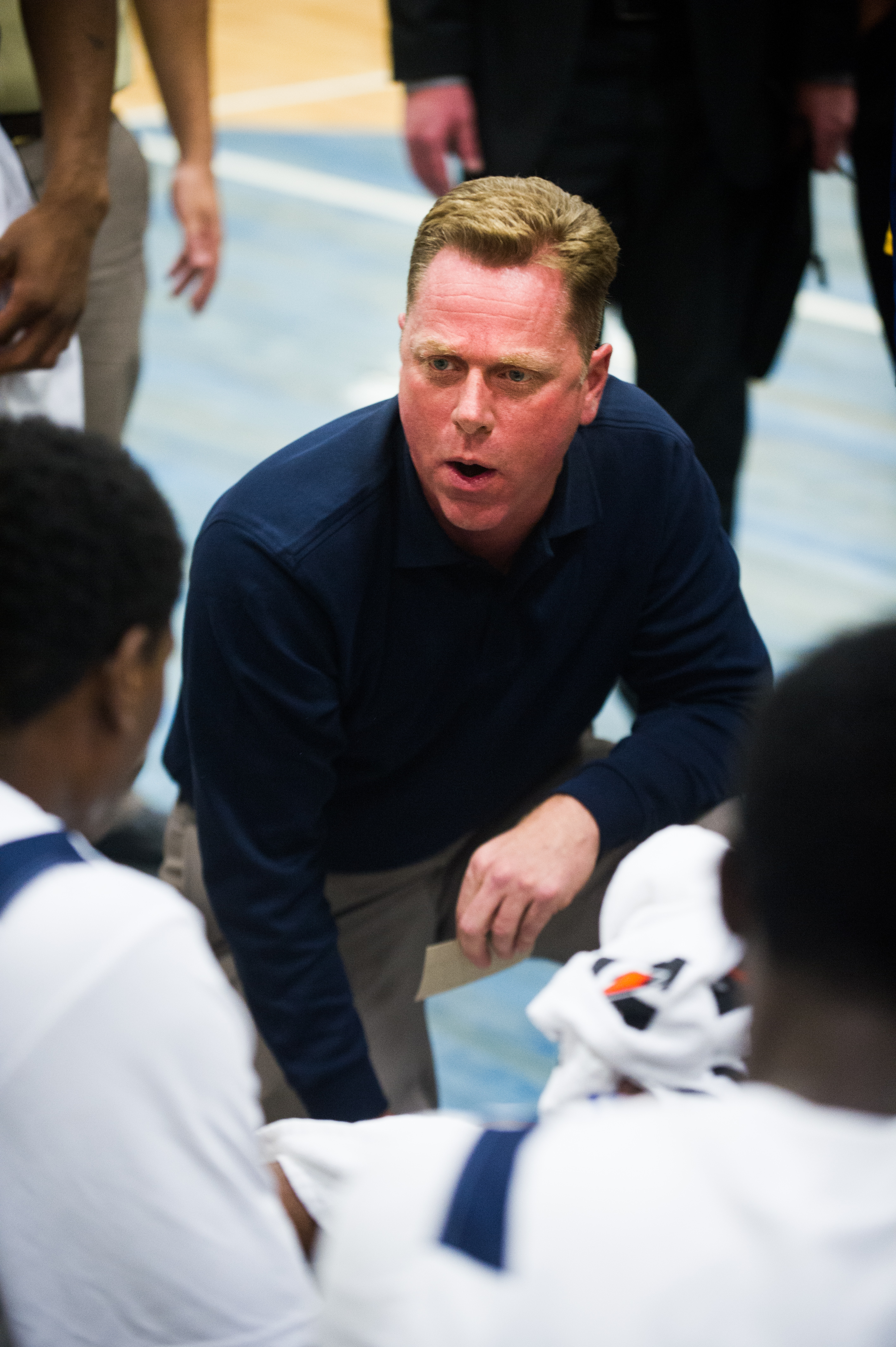
Sam Walker, head coach from 2000 to 2017, is the winningest coach in program history

Peak's assistant coach Sam Walker became head coach in 2000. Under Walker, the Lions won 285 games, had 10 winning seasons, and a Lone Star Conference Championship in 2005 and 2015. Walker's 2005 team went to the NCAA Elite 8 and won the Lone Star Conference Championship in 2015 and went back to the NCAA tournament, before losing in the first round to conference foe Angelo State in the NCAA first round. In Walker's final season in 2017, the Lions again qualified for the NCAA Tournament. Walker retired from coaching in 2017 to take another position with the university. His 285 wins make him the winningest coach in program history.

=== Current era ===
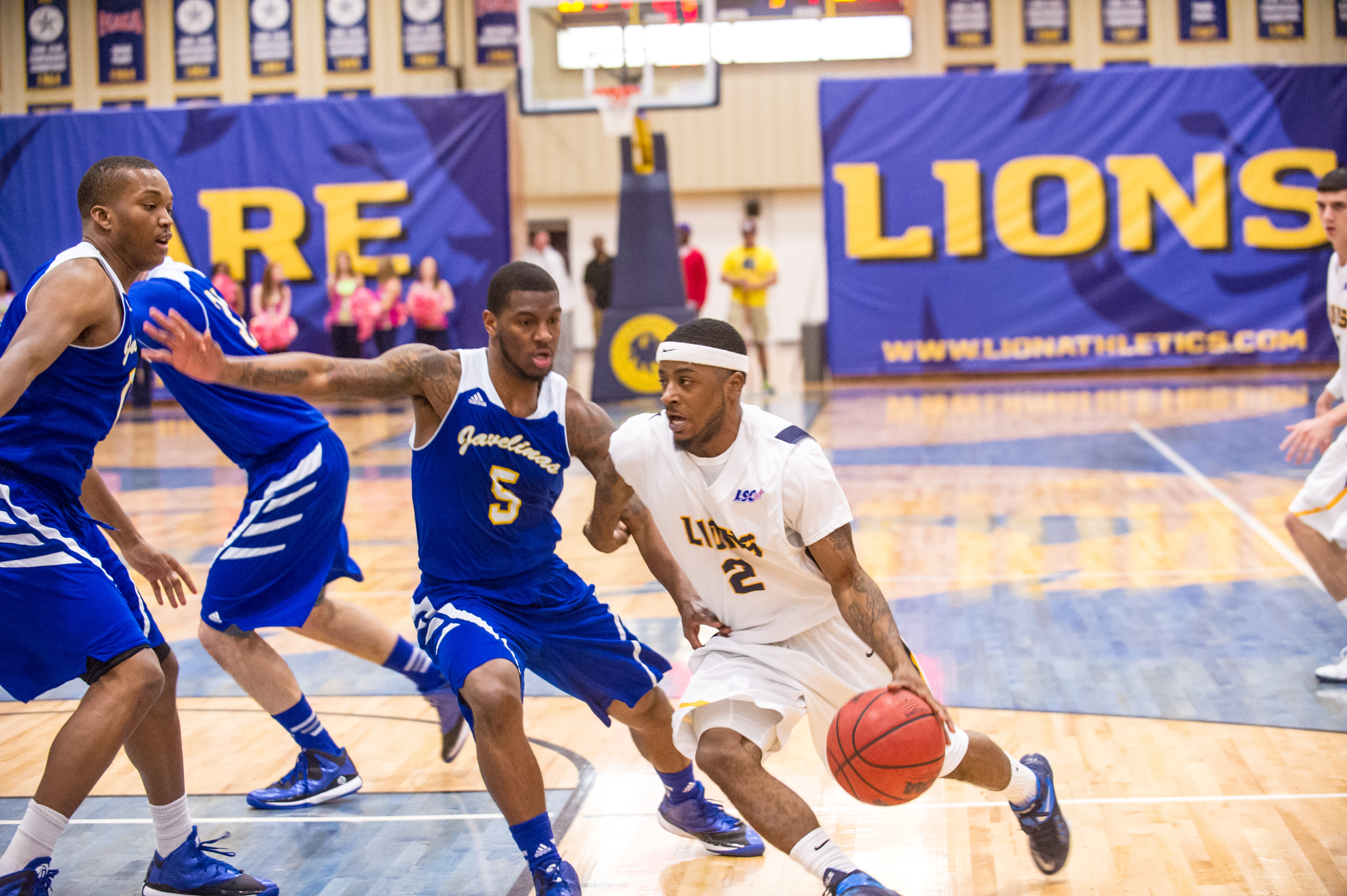
The A&M-Commerce men's basketball team in action against the A&M-Kingsville Javelinas in 2015

Jaret von Rosenberg became the head coach in 2017. The Lions finished second overall in the Conference during the 2017–18 and the 2018–19 seasons and also qualified for the NCAA tournament, finishing as NCAA South Central Region semi-finalists both times. After falling in the LSC semi-finals during the 2019–20 season, the Lions missed the LSC Tournament in 2020-21 after recording a 7-7 record. In 2021–22, the Lions returned to both the LSC and Regional Tournaments, but suffered first round exits in both.

In September 2021, the Lions accepted an invitation to join the Southland Conference and NCAA Division I. They debuted in the Southland Conference in the 2022–23 season and began their four-year transition process to garner full-time Division I status.

=== Coaches ===
#	Name	Term	Games	Wins	Losses	Ties	Win%	Conf. Wins	Conf. Losses	Conf. Ties	Conf. Win%	PW	PL	CCs	NCs
1	Johnny Garrity	1916	6	3	3	0	.500	0	0	0	–	0	0	0	0
2	H.D. Phillips	1917–1918	15	5	10	0	.333	0	0	0	–	0	0	0	0
3	E.M. Tipton	1919	5	2	3	0	.400	0	0	0	–	0	0	0	0
4	Cecil Cushman	1920	8	5	3	0	.625	0	0	0	–	0	0	0	0
5	Russell Jerrigan	1921–1923	30	14	16	0	.467	0	0	0	–	0	0	0	0
6	Joe Murphy	1924–1927	55	27	28	0	.491	0	0	0	–	0	0	0	0
7	Will Hill Acker	1928–1930	65	46	19	0	.708	0	0	0	–	0	0	0	0
8	J.V. Sikes	1931–1934	73	36	37	0	.493	22	16	0	.579	0	0	1	0
9	S.J. Petty	1935–1936	43	30	13	0	.698	12	4	0	.750	0	0	1	0
10	Dennis Vinzent	1937–1945	152	92	60	0	.605	39	26	0	.600	0	1	3	0
11	Darrell Tulley	1946–1949	95	59	36	0	.621	32	16	0	.667	4	3	2	0
12	M.A. Smith	1950	22	13	9	0	.591	5	3	0	.625	0	0	0	0
13	Jack Woodruff	1951	24	11	13	0	.458	5	5	0	.500	0	0	0	0
14	Bob Rogers	1952–1956	147	113	34	0	.769	48	10	0	.828	20	3	4	1
15	Norman Pilgram	1957–1967	278	152	126	0	.547	81	70	0	.536	5	3	2	0
16	Phil Andrews	1968	27	9	18	0	.333	3	11	0	.214	0	0	0	0
17	Jim Gudger	1969–1982	392	202	190	0	.515	123	106	0	.537	11	5	3	0
18	Jerry Matthews	1983–1990	225	99	126	0	.440	42	53	0	.442	0	0	2	0
19	Paul Peak	1991–1999	252	134	118	0	.532	61	59	0	.508	3	3	2	0
20	Sam Walker	2000–2017	487	285	202	0	.585	119	109	0	.502	2	2	2	0
21	Jaret Von Rosenberg	2017-Present	263	130	133	0	.494	78	86	0	.476	2	2	2	0

== Arena ==
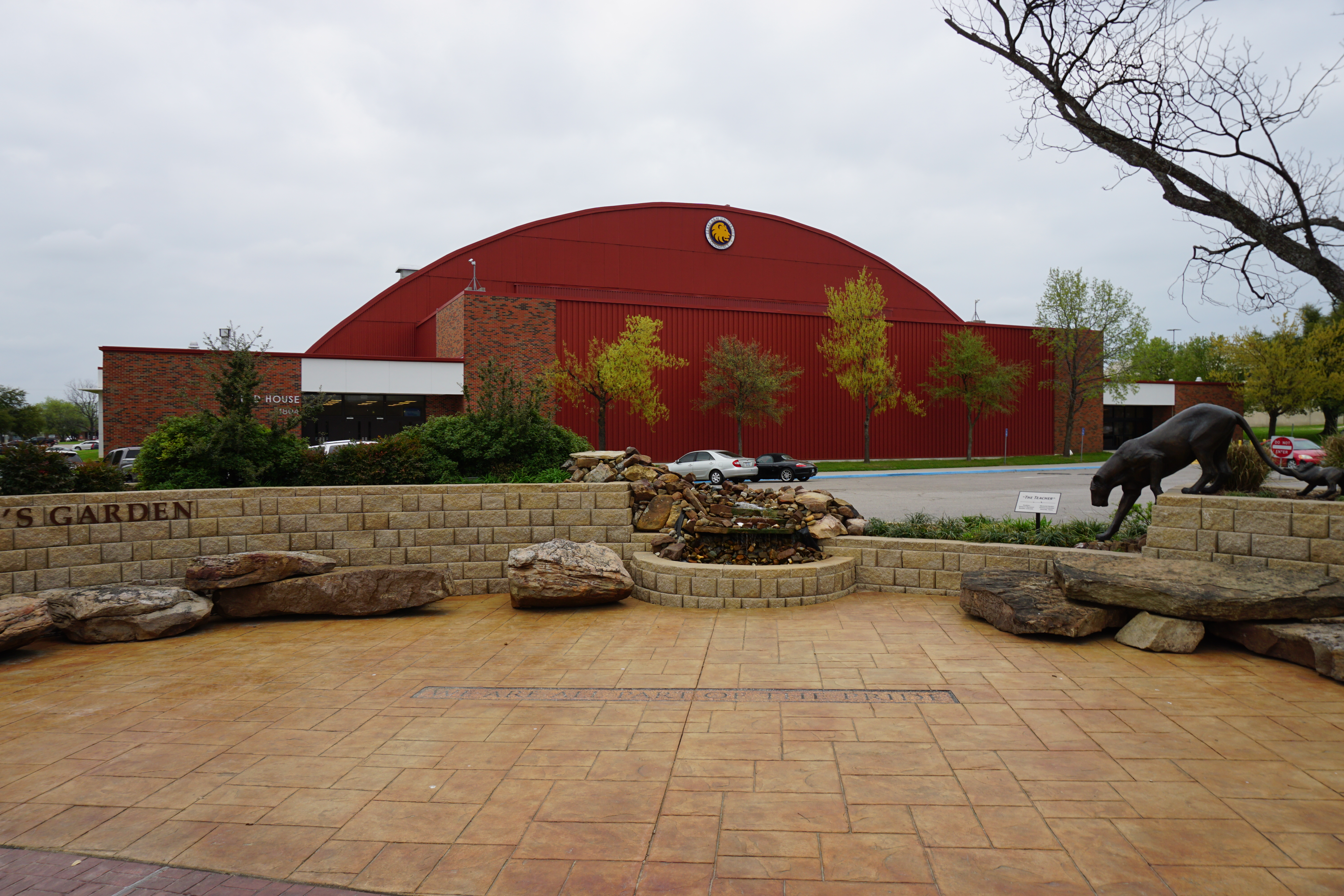
Texas A&M–Commerce Field House

The East Texas A&M men and women's basketball teams both share the university field house along with volleyball . The field house was constructed in 1950 and has been home to Men's basketball for over six decades. The Field House covers 69,000 square feet and will seat 3,055 people for either a volleyball or basketball contest. The facility is also the host to the university's Athletic Administration staff, the Sports Medicine Department and the Health and Human Performance Department; in addition to the offices for the basketball, cross country and track and field, golf, soccer and volleyball teams.

The Field House is shaped like an airplane hangar and has space for three basketball courts crossways. The floor allows three games to be played at the same time under one roof. The one lengthwise court is reserved for East Texas A&M basketball and volleyball matches. With an arched roof, 58 feet from the ground at the highest point, is supported on steel beams that are stationed at one end. The university recently upgraded the hardwood court and placed a giant lion head logo in the center of the court similar to the one at Memorial Stadium.

== Notable former players ==
- Bob Carpenter a former basketball player who won an NBL Championship in 1941 with the Oshkosh All-Stars, he also played in the NBA for the Fort Wayne Pistons and Tri-Cities Blackhawks.
- Jake Carter a former basketball player who played in the NBL and NBPL. In the 1949-50 season he played in the NBA for the Denver Nuggets and the Anderson Packers.
- Homer Fuller a former basketball player who played in the NBL for the Oshkosh All-Stars in the 1944-45 season.
- Bill Gaines a former basketball player drafted by the San Diego Rockets in 1968 NBA draft in the first round, and also drafted by Houston Mavericks of the ABA, he appeared in one game for the Mavericks before being cut.
- Ross Hodge a former basketball player at A&M-Commerce who is currently the head coach at West Virginia University.
- Lee Johnson a former basketball player drafted in the first round of the 1979 NBA draft to the Houston Rockets, Johnson spent the 1980 season with the Rockets and Pistons and also played for the Rochester Zeniths of the CBA and was awarded CBA Rookie of the Year and CBA Playoffs MVP after guiding the Zeniths to a CBA championship. He spent most of his career playing for teams in Italy, Israel, and France. Johnson was part of the Arrigoni Rieti during the 1979-80 season and won the Korać Cup. Johnson also won three consecutive Israeli League Championships and three consecutive Israeli Cups during his time with Maccabi Tel Aviv. In 1991, he won the French League Championship with Olympique Antibes
- John Lotz a former basketball player at East Texas State who later became head coach for Florida, after serving as an assistant coach at North Carolina.
- Shelby Metcalf was a member of the East Texas State Lions Men's team that won the NAIA 1954-55 National Championship, after his playing career he went on to coach at Texas A&M for 27 seasons.
- Mike Miller a former basketball player at East Texas State who went on to become the head coach at Texas State and Eastern Illinois. Currently, Miller is an assistant coach for the Washington Wizards in the NBA.
- Devondrick Walker basketball player for Rockingham Flames of the NBL1 West. Helped lead the Rockingham Flames to an NBL1 West championship and was named NBL1 West Grand Final MVP and NBL1 West League MVP.
- Kevin Widemond a former basketball player who played for Overense in 2009, Widemond died due to a heart attack during a game.
- Darrell Williams (born 1989), former professional basketball player that played for teams in Belgium, Serbia, Israel, France, Puerto Rico, Italy, and Mexico. In 2015 while at A&M-Commerce Williams was named South Central region player of the year, a Daktronics first team All-American and the Texas Association of Basketball Coaches' (TABC) small college player of the year.

== See also ==
- East Texas A&M Lions women's basketball
