= W. H. Adamson High School =

School in Dallas, Texas, United States

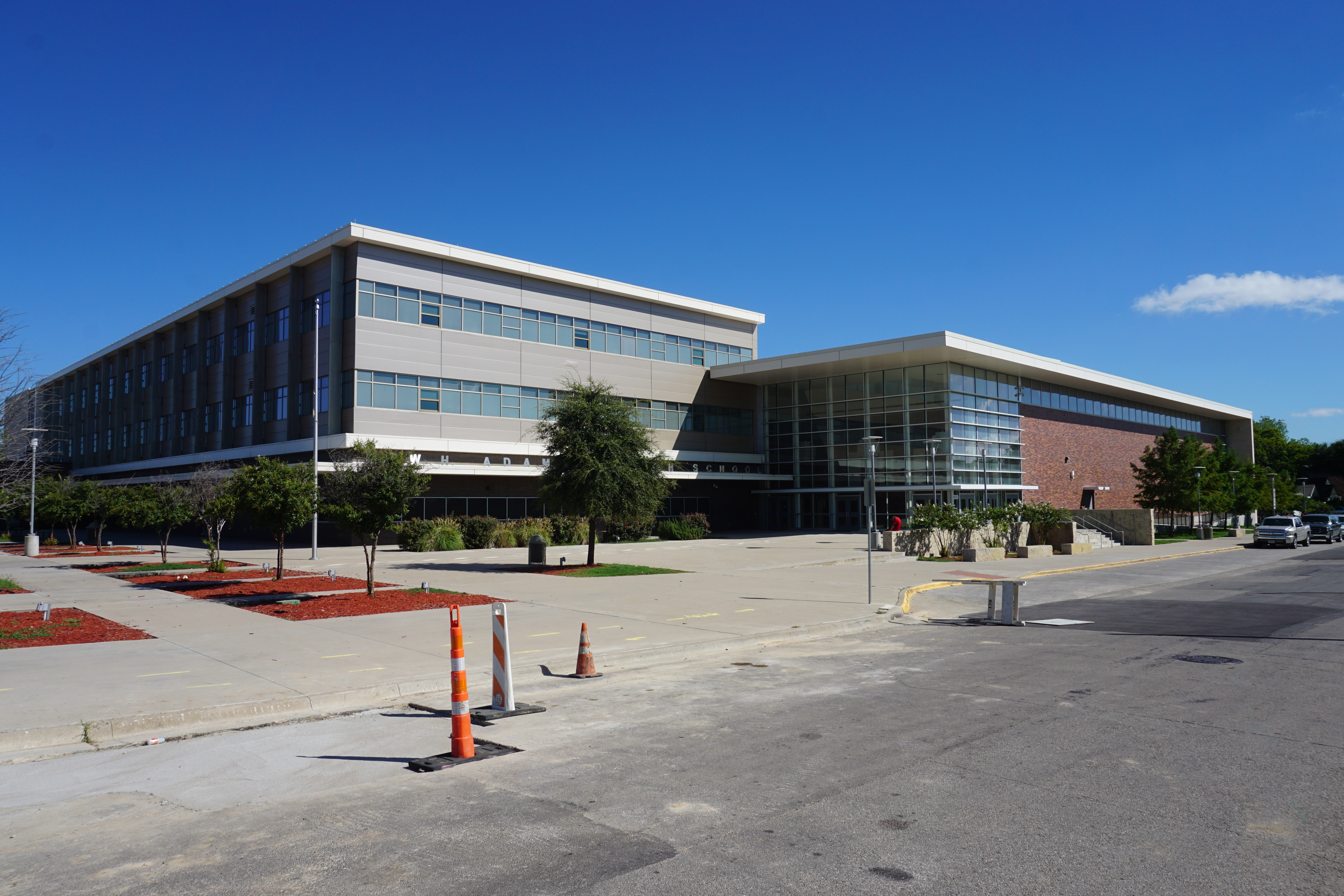

Location
- 309 East Ninth Street; Dallas, Texas 75203; United States; 32°44′54″N 96°49′13″W

Information
- Former name: Oak Cliff High School
- School type: Public, high school
- Motto: All Together Adamson. Learning Today. Leading Tomorrow.
- School district: Dallas Independent School District
- Principal: Stephanie Amaya
- Faculty: 98.62 (FTE)
- Grades: 9–12
- Enrollment: 1,398 (2023-2024)
- Student to teacher ratio: 14.18
- Colors: Royal Blue; White
- Athletics: Baseball • Basketball • Cross Country • Football • Golf • Soccer • Softball • Swimming & Diving • Tennis • Track & Field • Volleyball • Wrestling
- Athletics conference: UIL
- Mascot: Leopard
- Website: www.dallasisd.org/adamson
- W.H. Adamson High School
- U.S. National Register of Historic Places
- Dallas Landmark
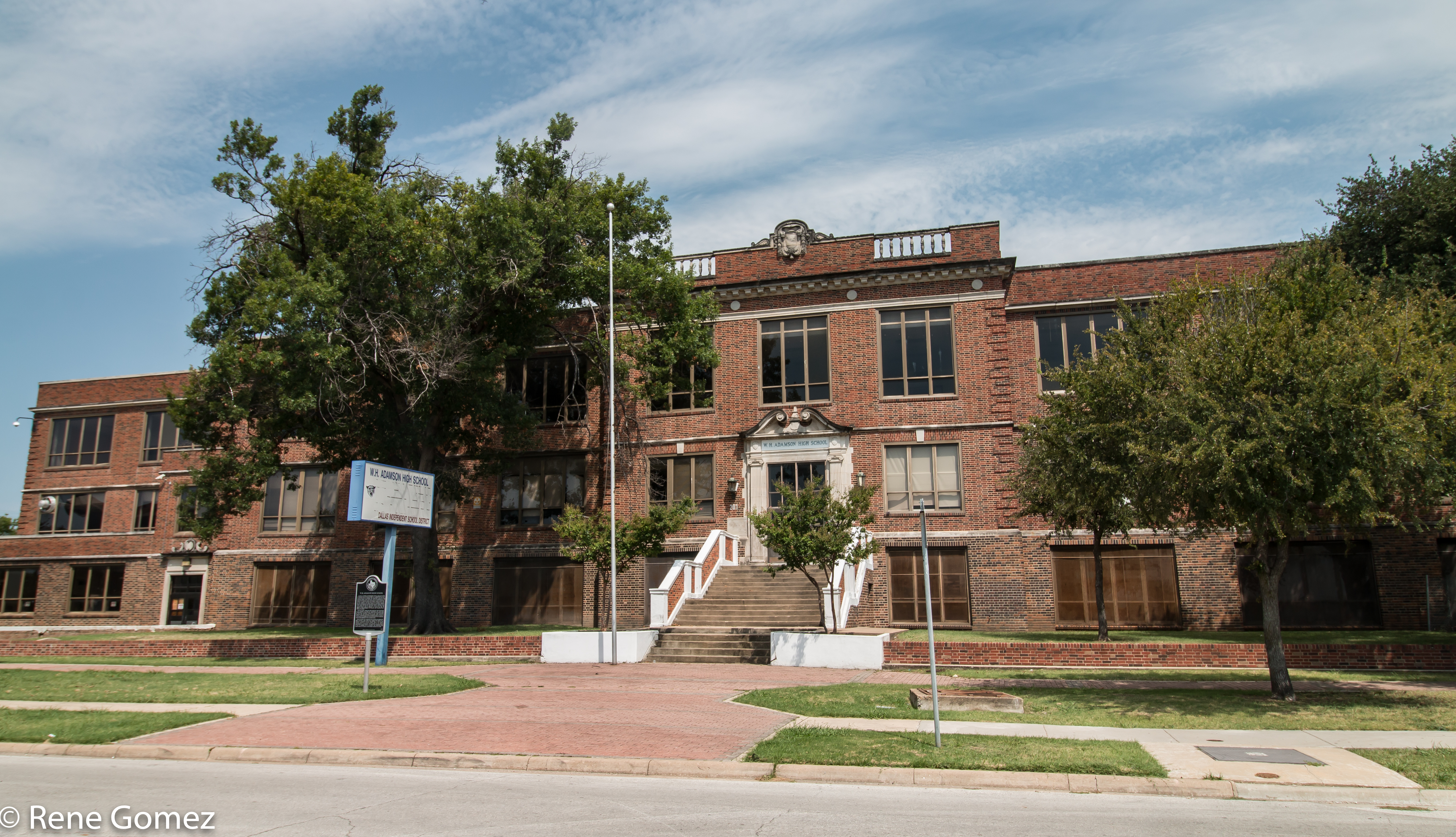
- Former Adamson High School in 2017

- Location within Texas Location within the United States
- Location: 201 E. 9th St., Dallas, Texas
- Area: 9 acres (3.6 ha)
- Built: 1915
- Built by: Holmboe Co., J.J. Fritch, Roland Construction Co.
- Architect: W.B. Ittner; Roscoe DeWitt; M. Lemmon; Gordon, Hefley & Hall
- Architectural style: Colonial Revival
- NRHP reference No.: 11000343
- DLMK No.: H/139

Significant dates
- Added to NRHP: June 8, 2011
- Designated DLMK: June 8, 2011

William Hardin Adamson High School, formerly Oak Cliff High School, is a public secondary school located in the Oak Cliff area of Dallas, Texas, United States. It is part of the Dallas Independent School District and is classified as a 5A school by the UIL. In 2015, the school was rated "Met Standard" by the Texas Education Agency.

== History ==
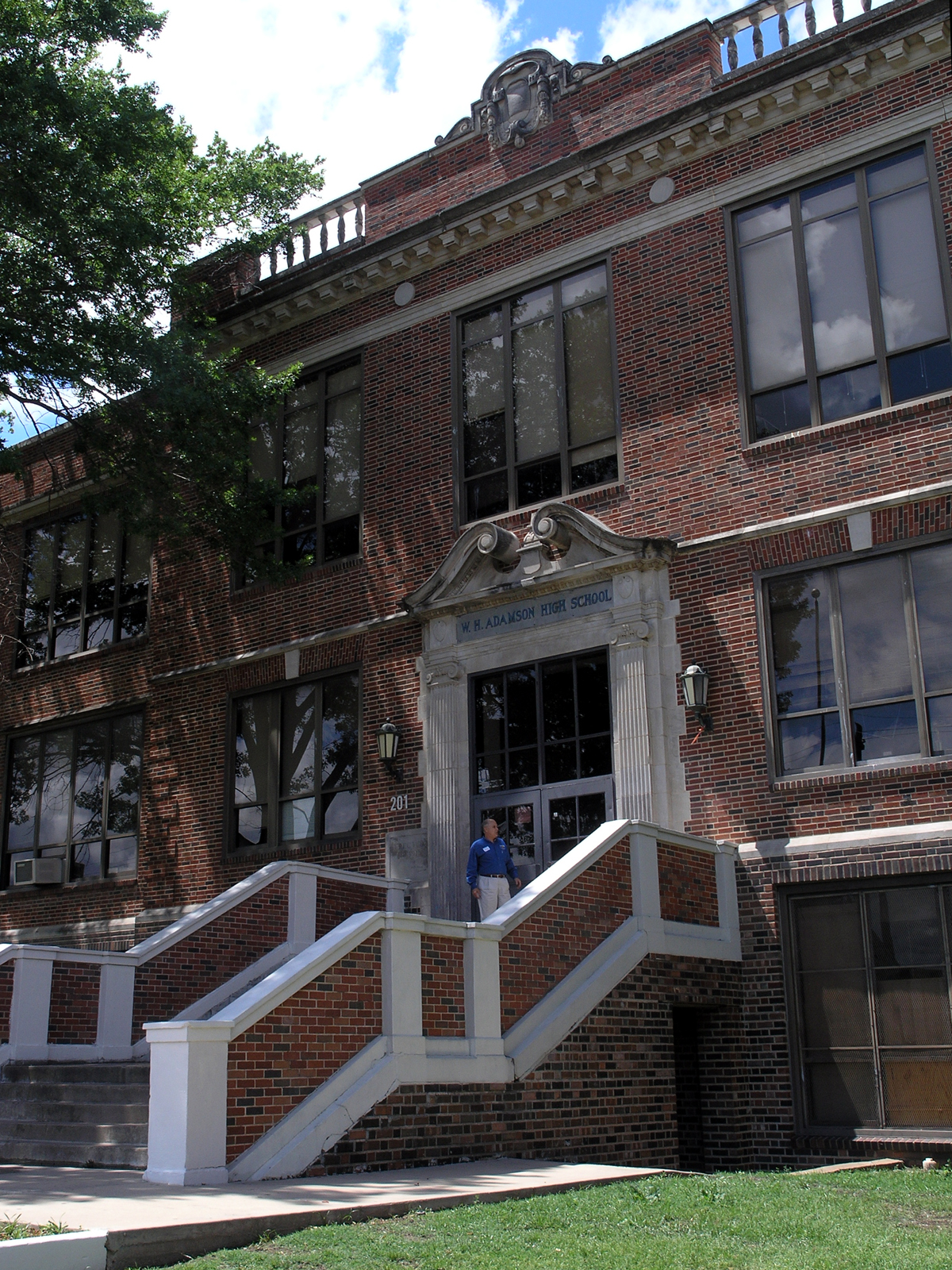
Old campus

In 1891 the newly-incorporated Town of Oak Cliff voted to seek bids on a school building. The newspaper reported: "Resolved by the city council of Oak Cliff that the mayor be instructed to advertise for plans for a modern three-story brick school building with brick cross walls [sic] to be erected at Oak Cliff, Texas, to contain twelve rooms for school purposes and the cost of said building, complete, not to exceed the sum of $22,000,…" The cornerstone was laid at the corner of Patton and Tenth streets for the school in September, 1892 under the auspices of the Masonic grand lodge of Texas.

In 1891 William Hardin Adamson was named superintendent and Oak Cliff Central School operated at that location until a new building was constructed to house the high school in 1915 at the corner of Ninth and Beckley. The old building was then operated as an elementary school until 1926 when it was torn down and the students assigned to John H. Reagan and James Bowie schools and later to the new Ruthmeade School (now John F. Peeler). The lot at 201 East Ninth Street has been the site of a Dallas high school facility since 1915.

The school is named for William Hardin Adamson, who became superintendent of the Oak Cliff School District shortly after moving to Oak Cliff in 1901. In the decade after the City of Dallas annexed the Town of Oak Cliff and merged school districts, the Dallas ISD built Oak Cliff High School to relieve crowding at Dallas High School, built just 8 years prior. Adamson was named principal of the new school. He served as principal until 1934 and died a year later on 26 May 1935 at age 71. A week after his death, the school system renamed Oak Cliff High School after Adamson.

The 1924 Oak Cliff High School football team won the state championship, one of only two DISD high schools to win a state football title (Sunset, in 1950 with the now-discontinued "City" championship, is the other). Carter High School was forced to forfeit its 1988 Class AAAAA title, so its state championship no longer counted.

Overcrowding problems at Oak Cliff High School were relieved by the 1925 opening of Sunset High School.

Adamson High School was one of six high schools for white students in Dallas in the 1930s and 1940s; the only other high school in Oak Cliff was Sunset High School, which was located about 19 blocks from Adamson High. Black students in the Oak Cliff area were not permitted to attend Adamson or Sunset and were forced to commute to Booker T. Washington, Lincoln, or James Madison High Schools until Franklin D. Roosevelt High School was opened in 1963.

The location of Adamson High School is just four blocks from the Texas Theater where Lee Harvey Oswald, the accused assassin of President John F. Kennedy, was captured.

During the Cold War, Adamson also became a fallout shelter. In the new building, a secret compartment room was added in the art room underground.

Around 2009, DISD planned to raze Adamson. Some Adamson alumni created a movement to have Adamson declared a Dallas landmark so that the district would be unable to raze the existing campus. DISD acquired other property so it could build the new Adamson.

The new Adamson was built on the site of the Oak Cliff Christian Church, which DISD had demolished after preservationists had not found a buyer for the facility. Houses and apartments were also acquired and demolished for the new facility.

On June 8, 2011, the old W. H. Adamson High School building was granted historical status by the Dallas City Council. Additionally in June 2011 the school was listed on the National Register of Historic Places.

Today there are two buildings. The new building is in use while, as of 2014, the old building is no longer occupied.

== Athletics ==
The W.H. Adamson Leopards compete in the following sports:

- Baseball
- Basketball
- Cross Country
- Football
- Golf
- Soccer
- Softball
- Swimming and Diving
- Tennis
- Track and Field
- Volleyball
- Wrestling

Adamson is one of the oldest football programs in Texas, it being the 9th oldest

== Facilities ==
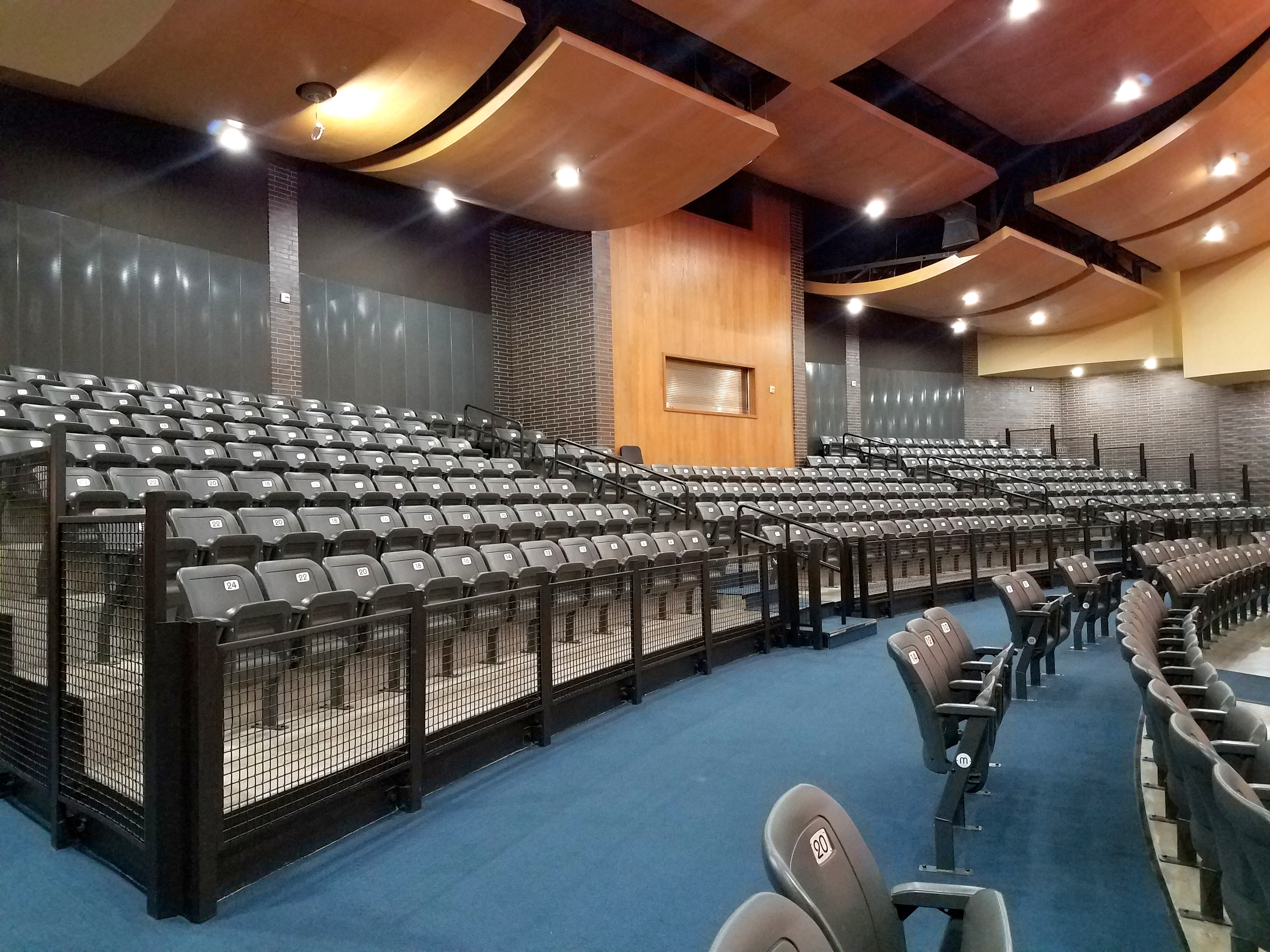
The auditorium of the new main building has 580 seats.

The current, main building has 223,496 square feet (20,763.5 m^{2}) of area. The auditorium of the main building has 580 seats. It has ROTC facilities, including a gun range; a coffee-shop operated by students; child development facilities; and facilities for disabled students.

In 2015 some alumni argued that the old building should be more heavily utilized.

There is also a separate automotive technology building.

== Demographics ==
As of 2008 Adamson had almost 1,240 students, with about 80% being from low income families and 94% being Hispanic and Latino. As of that year many of the students learned English as a second language, and the largest group of students who were not U.S. born originated from Ocampo, Guanajuato. That year the head ESL teacher, Marcia Niemann, stated that some students in the ESL program take jobs outside of school to finance family members in Mexico and the U.S., and that most parents of ESL students had educations below the equivalent of the 9th grade.

As of 2008 the school had 85 teachers, including 16 who were bilingual. That year the school had four full-time ESL teachers, four bilingual ESL teaching assistants, and two non-bilingual ESL teaching assistants.

== Culture ==
In 1978 band director Moisés Molina started the Mariachi Azul y Blanco; Molina, who died in 1994 from hemochromatosis, is the namesake of Moises E. Molina High School.

== Feeder patterns ==
- W. H. Adamson High School
  - Hector P. Garcia Middle School
    - Felix G. Botello Elementary School
    - James Bowie Elementary School
    - James S. Hogg Elementary School
    - John F. Peeler Elementary School
    - John H. Reagan Elementary School

== Notable alumni ==
- Jay Avrea - professional baseball player
- Charles P. Cabell - U.S. Air Force four-star general and deputy director of the Central Intelligence Agency (1953–1963)
- Yvonne Craig - Batgirl from the 1960s TV series Batman
- Samuel David Dealey - Navy submarine hero
- E. King Gill - Texas A&M University's 12th man
- Larry Groce - noted singer, songwriter, musician and radio host.
- Pinky Higgins - professional baseball player
- Ray Wylie Hubbard (Class of 1963) - country-western singer-songwriter
- James L. Holloway Jr. (class of 1915) - U.S. Navy four-star admiral and superintendent of the U.S. Naval Academy (1947–1950)
- Michael Martin Murphey (class of 1963) - country-western music artist
- Barrick Nealy (class of 2002) - former professional football player and coach
- Kal Segrist - former Major League Baseball utility infielder, and fifth head coach of the Texas Tech Red Raiders baseball team.
- B. W. Stevenson (class of 1967) - country pop music artist
- Elda Voelkel (Hartley) (class of 1928?) - actress; producer and distributor of documentary and spiritual films
- Jim Wright (class of 1939) - elected to Texas State House of Representatives (1947), mayor of Weatherford (1948), elected to U.S. Congress (1955), Speaker of the United States House of Representatives (1987–1989)
- Alvin Porter - professional football player

== See also ==
- National Register of Historic Places listings in Dallas County, Texas
- List of Dallas Landmarks
