= Bill Gaines (basketball) =

American basketball player

Personal information
- Born: March 10, 1946 (age 80)
- Listed height: 6 ft 4 in (1.93 m)
- Listed weight: 185 lb (84 kg)

Career information
- High school: James Madison (Dallas, Texas)
- College: Henderson County CC (1964–1966); East Texas A&M (1966–1968)
- NBA draft: 1968: 15th round, 185th overall pick
- Drafted by: San Diego Rockets
- Position: Guard
- Number: 15

Career history
- 1968: Houston Mavericks

Career highlights
- Junior College All-American (1965); 2× All-Texas Eastern Conference team (1965, 1966); Second-team All-LSC (1967)
- Stats at Basketball Reference

William Roosevelt Gaines (born March 10, 1946) is a former basketball player who played the guard position. He starred at Henderson County Community College and East Texas State University (now East Texas A&M University) before playing briefly with the Houston Mavericks in the American Basketball Association (ABA).

Gaines attended James Madison High School in Dallas, Texas, where he played basketball and football alongside his brother Henry. After missing out most of his senior season following a football injury that required a surgery, he signed a letter of intent to play for the University of Wichita. He never played for Wichita and later started his college career at Henderson County CC in the National Junior College Athletic Association where he was twice All-Texas Eastern Conference and once Junior College All-American. In 1966, he won the Texas Eastern Conference (TEC) while leading it in scoring with a 30.6 point average and was named to the TEC All-Conference team.

The following season, he signed a letter of intent with North Texas State University but later transferred to East Texas State University (now known as Texas A&M Commerce) where he averaged 16.8 points and 6.2 rebounds his first season and made the All-Lone Star Conference second team. He missed a large part of the following season, but still led the team with 326 points, for an average of 25.1 points per game.

Gaines was drafted by the San Diego Rockets as the first pick in the fifteenth round of the 1968 NBA draft and by the Houston Mavericks in the 13th round of the American Basketball Association (ABA) draft. He signed with the Mavericks during the summer and appeared in the team's opening game of the 1968–69 season, scoring two points. He was waived by the Mavericks a week later, along with Rich Dumas.
