= Darrell Williams (basketball) =

American basketball player (born 1989)

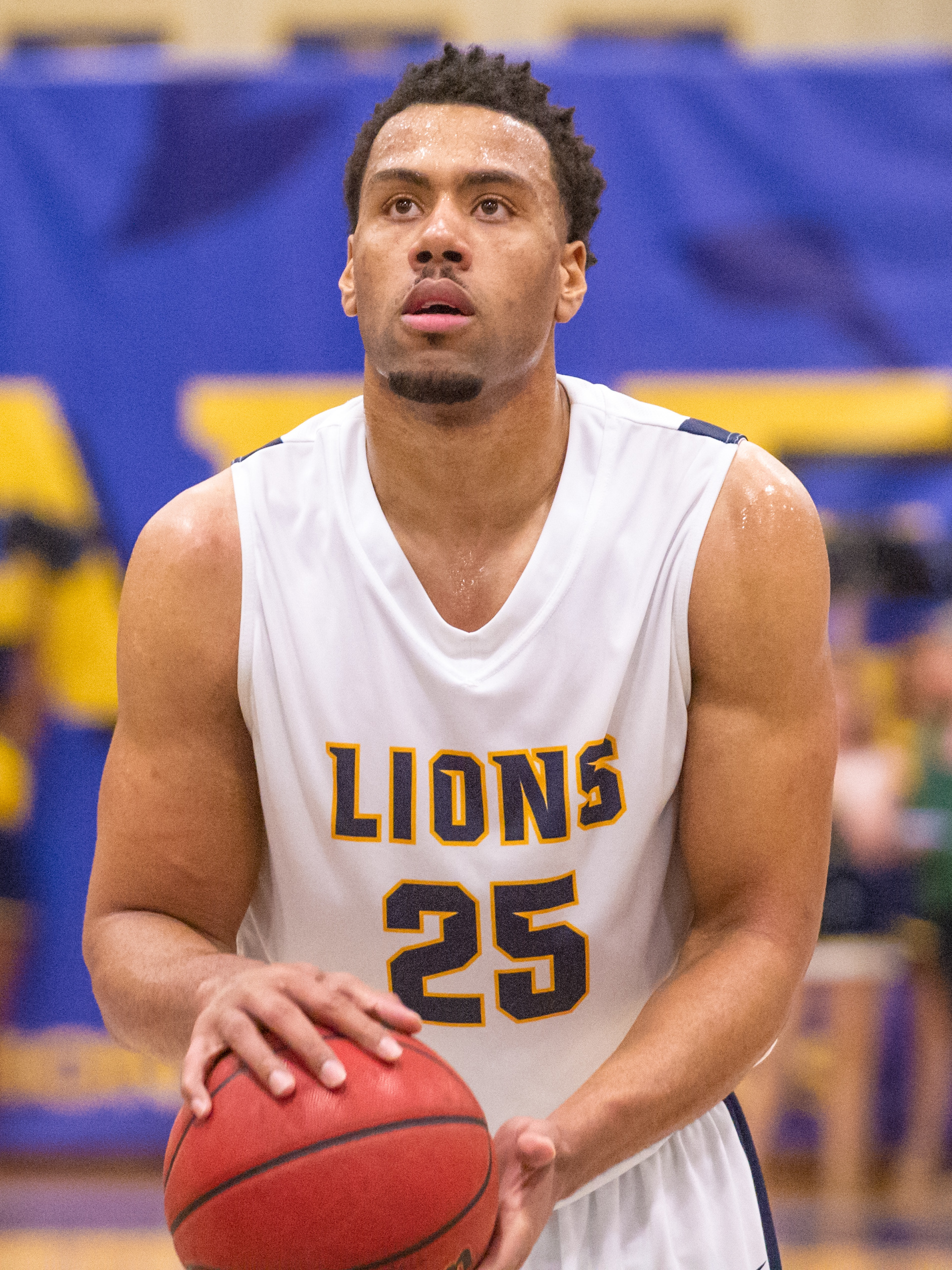
- Williams playing for East Texas A&M in 2015.

Personal information
- Born: September 15, 1989 (age 37) Chicago, Illinois, U.S.
- Listed height: 6 ft 8 in (2.03 m)
- Listed weight: 245 lb (111 kg)

Career information
- High school: Dunbar Vocational (Chicago, Illinois)
- College: Chipola (2008–2009); Midland (2009–2010); Oklahoma State (2010–2011); East Texas A&M (2014–2015)
- NBA draft: 2015: undrafted
- Playing career: 2015–2020
- Position: Power forward / center

Career history
- 2015–2016: Verviers-Pepinster
- 2016: Partizan
- 2016–2017: Hapoel Tel Aviv
- 2017: Bnei Herzliya
- 2017–2018: Yeşilgiresun
- 2018–2019: Le Portel
- 2019: Atléticos de San Germán
- 2019: Vanoli Cremona
- 2019: Sigortam.net İTÜ BB
- 2020: Fuerza Regia de Monterrey

Career highlights
- Daktronics NCAA Division II All–American (2015); LSC Newcomer of the Year (2015); LSC Player of the Year (2015); TABC Small College Player of the Year (2015)

Darrell Williams (born September 15, 1989) is an American former professional basketball player.

== High school ==
Williams played at Dunbar Vocational High School in Chicago where he led his team to a district title with a 10–0 mark as a senior and guided his team to a regional semifinals loss in Class 4A. In the district finale against Bowen he scored 20 points and also had 20 rebounds and blocked 8 shots.

== College career ==
=== Freshman year ===
Williams played at Chipola College during his freshman season. He averaged 7.4 points and six rebounds per game at Chipola College. He led the Indians to finish third place in the NJCAA national tournament with a 34–2 mark. In the third-place game against Connors State College he scored 18 points, grabbed 14 rebounds and dished out four assists as the Indians defeated the Cowboys, 102–70, at the NJCAA national tournament.

=== Sophomore year ===
During his sophomore season he played at Midland College. He averaged a double-double with nearly 14 points and more than 10 rebounds per game during that season. While also shooting 54.2 percent from the floor, and making 147 of 271 shots. He led his team to a 30–3 record as the Chaparrals fell to eventual NJCAA national champion Howard in the regional finals. He also had 13 double–doubles that season and was one of the highest ranked junior college prospects.

=== Junior year ===
After drawing offers from Gonzaga, DePaul, Kansas State, Oklahoma, Texas, and Oklahoma State, Williams chose to sign as a transfer to Oklahoma State for his junior season. He played in 23 games for the Cowboys and started 12. He led the team in rebounding with 7.3 boards per contest, grabbing 168 rebounds in 23 games, averaged 7.1 points per contest while shooting 47.3 percent from the floor.

=== Sexual assault allegations ===
On December 12, 2010 Williams attended a party in Stillwater. At this party two women claimed that Williams sexually assaulted them. Hearings followed, and though there was no physical evidence or witnesses, the district attorney believed the alleged victims' claims. On July 23, 2012, Williams was convicted on sexual assault charges and spent three months in jail. In April 2014, the Oklahoma Court of Appeals overturned the conviction. The case will not be re-tried.

=== Senior year ===
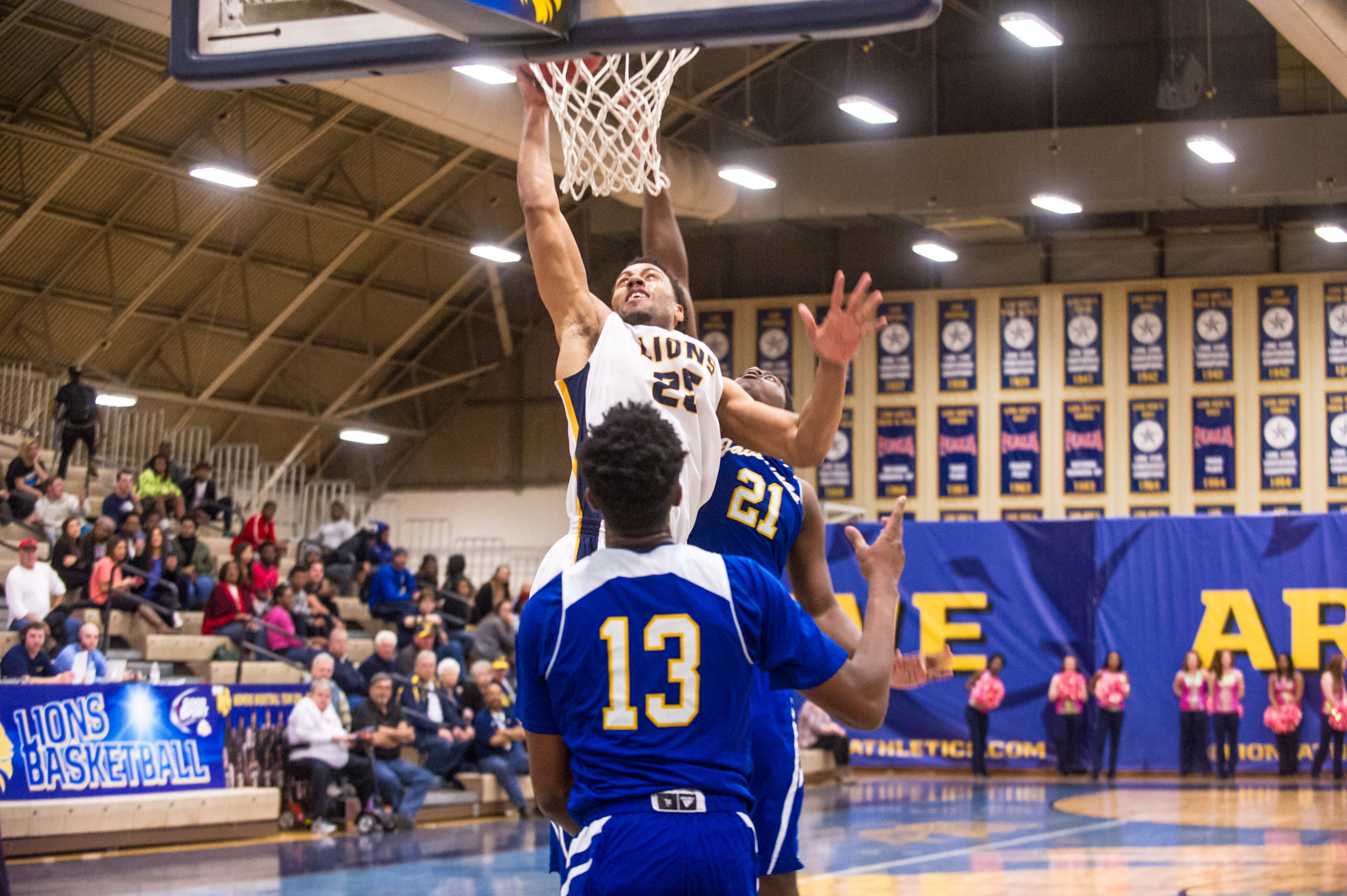
Williams dunking against A&M–Kingsville in 2015.

Williams spent his senior season at Texas A&M University–Commerce (now East Texas A&M University) for the Lions he averaged a double-double with 18.5 points per game and 12.4 rebounds per game. He finished second in the NCAA DII with 23 double-doubles. He also led the Lions to a 24–8 record and a championship victory in the Lone Star Conference (LSC) tournament, Williams was named the game's MVP. In the championship game against Angelo State he scored 15 points, had 13 rebounds and also a double-double. He was awarded LSC newcomer of the year and player of the year honors. He was also named the South Central region player of the year, a Daktronics first team All-American and the Texas Association of Basketball Coaches' (TABC) small college player of the year.

== Professional career ==
After going undrafted in the 2015 NBA draft, he joined the Chicago Bulls for the 2015 NBA Summer League. In 5 games, he averaged 3.8 points and 4.6 rebounds per game.

In August 2015, he signed his first professional contract with VOO Wolves Verviers-Pepinster of the Scooore League in Belgium. In 10 games, he averaged 17.2 points and 10.7 rebounds per game in 26.2 minutes on the court.

On January 8, 2016, Williams signed with Serbian club Partizan Belgrade for the rest of the season. He took the number 25. On January 16, 2016, Williams has officially made his debut for Partizan in the ABA League against Krka and for 14 minutes on the court, he scored 4 points and had 4 rebounds.

On July 8, 2016, Williams signed with Hapoel Tel Aviv of the Israeli Premier League. On April 16, 2017, he parted ways with Hapoel after averaging 11.7 points and 6.9 rebounds per game in Israeli League. Seven days later, he signed with Bnei Herzliya for the remainder of the season.

In 2017, Williams was once again invited to an NBA Summer League roster, this time with the Golden State Warriors. In three games, he averaged 5.5 minutes, 3.3 points and 2.0 rebounds per game.

On November 6, 2017, Williams signed with Turkish club Yeşilgiresun Belediye.

On June 27, 2018, Williams signed with French club ESSM Le Portel.

On June 11, 2019, Williams signed with Puerto Rican Club Atléticos de San Germán.

On July 15, 2019, Williams signed with Italian club Vanoli Cremona. After the pre-season his contract was terminated by the team and he has signed a contract with Sigortam.net İTÜ BB of the Basketball Super League on September 23, 2019. After playing only 3 games, his contract has been terminated by his club.

On January 7, 2020, Williams signed with Mexican club Fuerza Regia de Monterrey In 6 games with the club, he averaged 13.8 minutes, 5.8 points and 2.8 rebounds per game. Williams was let go from the team on January 25, 2020.
