= Hartley Film Foundation =

US nonprofit organization

Hartley Film Foundation is a 501(c)(3) organization dedicated to cultivation and support of documentaries on world religions and spirituality. This non-profit organization supports filmmakers through seed grants with fiscal sponsorship. The foundation is located in Westport, Connecticut, and has a staff of two and board of eleven members.

== Background ==
Hartley Film Foundation, incorporated in 1971, was the vision of founder Elda E. Hartley. She had a long career in filmmaking. Elda married filmmaker Irving Hartley, with whom she partnered to make newsreels and travel films from the 1930s through the 1960s. Some of the images that now illustrate American history were shot by Irving Hartley, including the explosion of the Hindenburg zeppelin in 1937. He and Elda also produced a series of Pan Am travelogues, a prototype for travel shows on television today.

Elda worked as North Carolina State's Director of Visual Education and, in the 1930s, she helped found the Documentary Film Association, which exhibited at the first New York World's Fair.

Elda's vision of the future foundation began in 1965, while on a vacation tour to Japan with Alan Watts. She decided to make a film on Zen and Watts volunteered to narrate the film. At the age of 56, Elda Hartley was on her way to producing documentary films on world religions and spirituality – the beginning of her third career.

She completed films about the world's spiritual and religious traditions (including documentaries such as Requiem for a Faith and The Sufi Way), and collaborated with Margaret Mead, Joseph Campbell, Edgar Mitchell, Jean Houston, Ram Dass, Alan Watts, Huston Smith and Larry Dossey, among others.

Hartley often said that the goal of her work was greater than simply making films, and so she founded the Hartley Film Foundation. She died on her 90th birthday, March 6, 2001.

Hartley Film Foundation continues to honor her legacy through its support of established filmmakers who travel the world to document stories that further global and interfaith understanding. The Foundation strives to reach the widest possible audience with films such as Hiding and Seeking, A Jihad for Love, Love Free or Die, God's Next Army, Praying with Lior, Taking Root and Little White Lies. The non-profit foundation sells on its Web site those documentaries that fulfill Hartley's mission and message. Hartley sponsors the Full Frame Inspiration Award annually at the Full Frame Documentary Film Festival in Durham, North Carolina. The foundation also provides audience outreach consultation support to its fiscal sponsees through Active Voice, communications specialists who use media as a catalyst for social change.
