= Moisés E. Molina High School =

Molina High School

Location
- 2355 Duncanville Road; Dallas, Texas 75211; 32.723088°N 96.910709°W

Information
- Type: Public, Secondary
- Motto: Pride and Excellence in Education.
- School district: Dallas Independent School District
- Principal: Daisy Rivera
- Faculty: 150
- Teaching staff: 137.45 (FTE)
- Grades: 9-12
- Enrollment: 2,017 (2023-2024)
- Student to teacher ratio: 14.67
- Colors: Black and Teal
- Mascot: Jaguar
- Trustee dist.: 6, Carla Ranger
- Area: 6, James Ponce
- Website: www.dallasisd.org/molina

Moisés E. Molina High School is a public secondary school in the Oak Cliff area of Dallas, Texas (USA). Molina High School is part of the Dallas Independent School District and serves students from parts of southwestern Dallas and majority of Cockrell Hill.

In 2015, the school was rated "Met Standard" by the Texas Education Agency.

== History ==
The school opened in August 1997 across Duncanville Road from Mountain View College, a community college operated by the Dallas County Community College District.

The school is named for Moisés E. Molina, a musician and retired Dallas ISD teacher; he served as a band director for W. H. Adamson High School for over 15 years. He attended the University of Texas at Arlington and North Texas State University.

He died in 1994 from hemochromatosis.

== Athletics ==
The Molina Jaguars compete in the following sports:

- Baseball
- Basketball
- Cross Country
- American football
- Golf
- Soccer (Association football)
- Softball
- Swimming and Diving
- Tennis
- Track and Field
- Volleyball
- Wrestling
- Flag Football

== Extracurriculars ==
The school used to have the Ballet Folklórico Jaguara, an extracurricular dance program. In August 2001, the program was featured in Texas Dance Magazine.

The school also has the Jaguar Marching Band, Choir, Mariachi, Orchestra, Dance Company, Cheerleading, the Rosettes (Drill Team), etc.

== School demographics ==
The attendance rate for students at the school is 92%, in contrast to a state average of 96%. 80% of the students at Molina are economically disadvantaged, 7% are enrolled in special education, 9% are enrolled in gifted and talented programs, and 22% are considered to be "limited English proficient."

As of 2006 the ethnic makeup of the school is 89% Hispanic American, 9% African American, 1% White, non-Hispanic, 1% Asian/Pacific Islander American, and less than 1% American Indian/Alaskan Native.

The average class sizes at Molina are 23 students for English, 23 for foreign language, 23 for mathematics, 28 for science, and 22 for social studies.

Teachers at the school carry, on average, 10 years of teaching experience and 9% of the teachers on staff are first-year teachers.

== Feeder patterns ==
As of the 2024-25 school year the school is fed by one middle school:

- L. V. Stockard Middle School, fed by:
  - Leila P. Cowart Elementary School
  - Nancy J. Cochran Elementary School
  - Anson Jones Elementary School
  - Mary McLeod Bethune Elementary School
  - Celestino Mauricio Soto Jr. Elementary School
