= Cliff Lake =

Cliff Lake may refer to:

- Cliff Lake (Idaho), a glacial lake in Elmore County, Idaho
- Cliff Lake (Maine), a lake in Northwest Piscataquis, Maine
- Cliff Lake (Utah), a lake near Mount Powell in the Uinta Mountains, Utah
- Cliff Lake (Washington), a lake in Mount Rainier National Park
- Lake Cliff, a lake in Dallas, Texas
  - Lake Cliff, Dallas, Texas, a neighborhood in the Oak Cliff area of Dallas, Texas
- Cliff Lake (ice hockey), Canadian ice hockey player
