= Stevens Park =

Stevens Park may refer to:

USA

- Stevens Park Estates, Dallas, a neighborhood named for John P. Stevens in the Oak Cliff area of Dallas, Texas
- Stevens Park Village, Dallas, a neighborhood named for John P. Stevens in the Oak Cliff area of Dallas, Texas
- Stevens Park, Hoboken, a park in Hoboken, New Jersey

United Kingdom

- Stevens Park, Quarry Bank, a park in West Midlands, England

== See also ==
- Stevens (disambiguation)
