= Stevens =

Stevens may refer to:

== People ==
- Stevens (surname), including a list of people with the surname

=== Given name ===
- Stevens Baker (1791–1868), farmer and member of the Legislative Assembly of Lower Canada
- Stevens T. Mason (1811–1843), territorial governor of the Michigan Territory, first governor of the state of Michigan
- Stevens Thomson Mason (Virginia politician) (1760–1803), a colonel in the American Continental Army and senator from Virginia, grandfather of the above

== Places ==
=== United States ===
- Stevens, Pennsylvania, an unincorporated community
- Stevens, South Dakota, a ghost town
- Stevens County, Kansas
- Stevens County, Minnesota
- Stevens County, Washington
- Stevens Park (disambiguation), multiple locations
- Stevens Point, Wisconsin
- Stevens Township (disambiguation), multiple locations
- Stevens Village, Alaska, a census-designated place
- Lake Stevens, Washington, a lake and the surrounding city
- Stevens Creek, various creeks
- Stevens Pass, a pass through the Cascade Mountains in Washington
- Stevens Knoll, a hill that played a part in the Civil War Battle of Gettysburg

=== Other ===
- Stevens Rock, Antarctica
- 38540 Stevens, an asteroid
- Stevns Municipality, Denmark
  - Stevns Peninsula, Denmark

== Military ==
=== United States ===
- Fort Stevens (Oregon)
- Fort Stevens (Washington, D.C.)
- Battle of Fort Stevens (1864)
- USS Stevens (DD-86), U.S. Navy World War I destroyer
- USS Stevens (DD-479), U.S. Navy World War II destroyer

== Schools ==
- Stevens School (disambiguation)
- Stevens High School (disambiguation)
- Stevens Institute of Technology, Hoboken, New Jersey

== Businesses ==
- Stevens Arms, American firearms maker also known as the J Stevens Arms & Tool Co and the J Stevens Arms Co
- Stevens Motorcycles, a British company that made motorcycles from 1934 to 1938
- Stevens Vehicles, a British electric car and van manufacturer
- Stevens, The Kitchen Specialists, a New Zealand kitchenware retailer owned by the James Pascoe Group

== Automotive ==
- Stevens (constructor), a former racing car constructor
- Stevens-Duryea, early U.S. car

== Other uses ==
- Stevens Inquiries, a British government report
- Stevens grip, a percussion technique for holding four mallets
- Stevens' power law, a psychophysical theory
- Stevens MRT station, a mass rapid transit station in Singapore
- Stevens Field, an airfield in Colorado
- SS Stevens, a floating dormitory
- Stevens Center, a performance venue in Winston-Salem

== See also ==
- Steven (name)
- Stephens (name)
- Stephens (disambiguation)
- Justice Stevens (disambiguation)
- Stephen (disambiguation)
- Steve (disambiguation)
