= Stevens Park Golf Course =

Golf course in Dallas, Texas, US

- Interactive map of Stevens Park Golf Course
- 32°45′24″N 96°50′50″W

Club information
- Location: Dallas, Texas, United States
- Established: 1927
- Type: Public
- Tota holes: 18
- Website: https://www.stevensparkgolf.com/
- Designed by: Jack Burke Sr.
- Par: 70
- Length: 6,285 yards (5,747 m)

Stevens Park Golf Course is a public golf course in the Kessler area of Dallas, Texas United States. Often described as the "Little Augusta" of North Texas, the course is located just west of Downtown Dallas and nestled between the Stevens Park Estates and Kessler Park neighborhoods.

== History ==
Stevens Park golf course was opened in 1924 in Oak Cliff as the second municipal course in Dallas. Park golf course was originally designed by Jack Burke Sr. (father of 1956 Masters champion Jack Burke Jr.) in 1924 with 9 holes and later expanded to 18 holes.

In 2011, the course underwent an $8 million renovation by Fort Worth-based Colligan Golf Design. The complete renovation produced new routing with new tee boxes, fairways, greens, and 38 new sand bunkers. Infrastructure for irrigation and cart-paths were a $4.5 million part of the renovation budget.

As part of the renovation, trees were added throughout the golf course along with rosebushes to enhance the beauty of the course and complement the surrounding Kessler Park neighborhood. 2021 review from Dallas city hall showed over 42,000 rounds of golf with over $1 million in revenue beneficial to the city with the citation from GolfWeek 2014 listing Stevens Park among the 50 best municipal golf courses in the United States.

In 2017, design critic Andy Johnson wrote a review of the property highlighting six holes.

Stevens Park golf course was added to the National Register on June 17, 1994 as part of the Kessler Park Historic District.
