= West Kessler, Dallas =

Coordinates: 32°45′08.14″N 96°51′20.56″W

West Kessler (which also comprises the "annexed" neighborhood of Stevenswood) is a neighborhood named for George E. Kessler in Kessler, Dallas, Texas (USA).

Most of the neighborhood is bounded by Hampton Road on the west, Davis Street (SH 180) and the L. O. Daniel neighborhood on the south, the Twelve Hills Nature Center to the east, and the Stevens Park Golf Course on the north. The Stevenswood annex includes Bison Trail and Stevens Wood Lane & Court to the east of Oak Cliff Boulevard.
