= Steve Johnson (tight end) =

American football player (born 1965)

No. 85
- Position: Tight end

Personal information
- Born: June 22, 1965 (age 61); Huntsville, Alabama, U.S.
- Listed height: 6 ft 6 in (1.98 m)
- Listed weight: 245 lb (111 kg)

Career information
- High school: Oneonta (AL)
- College: Virginia Tech
- NFL draft: 1988: 6th round, 154th overall pick

Career history
- New England Patriots (1988–1989); Dallas Cowboys (1990)

Career NFL statistics
- Receptions: 1
- Receiving yards: 5
- Stats at Pro Football Reference

Steven Emil Johnson (born June 22, 1965) is an American former professional football player who was a tight end for the New England Patriots of the National Football League (NFL). He played college football for the Virginia Tech Hokies. He was selected in the sixth round of the 1988 NFL draft by the Patriots.

Johnson later became president and owner of Johnson Commercial Development. Based in Bristol, Virginia, it is one of the largest commercial developers in the Southeast. One of its projects, The Pinnacle in Bristol, Tennessee, was among the largest commercial projects in the country.

In 2013, Johnson gifted $1 million toward the construction of the Virginia Tech Indoor Practice Facility, and the university named the adjacent Steve Johnson Practice Fields in his honor.
