= Kessler Plaza, Dallas =

Coordinates: 32.74850°N 96.86147°W

Kessler Plaza is a neighborhood located in the Kessler area of Dallas, Texas, United States. It is the southernmost of the Kessler neighborhoods.

Development of Kessler Plaza began in the 1930s and continued into the 1950s. Architectural styles range from eclectic Tudor to Colonial Revival to ranch style. The last parcel of land was developed in the 1970s, reflecting a contemporary mode.

Kessler Plaza is noted for its picturesque cottages that display brick or Austin stone exteriors. Tenth Street and Marvin Avenue have the largest concentration of these cottages. Most have two bedrooms, although newer homes in the area have three.

As one of the older Oak Cliff neighborhoods, Kessler Plaza has remained desirable over the years. Many residents belong to the Kessler Plaza Neighborhood Association, founded in 1993 as well as the Old Oak Cliff Conservation League, a non-profit organization dedicated to preserving older homes and strengthening neighborhoods in the Oak Cliff area.

== See also ==
- George E. Kessler
