= Kiest station =

DART rail station in Dallas, Texas

Kiest
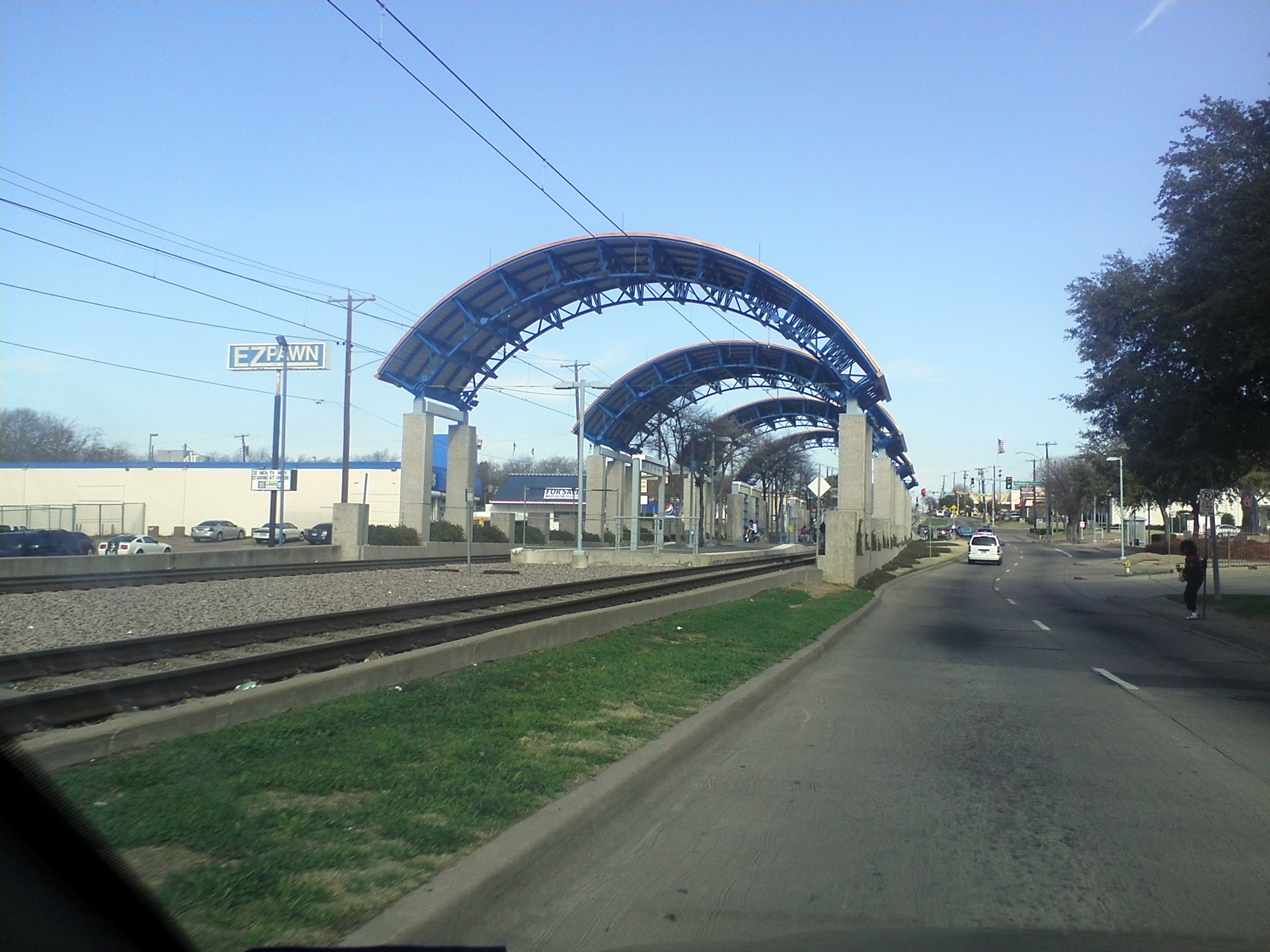

General information
- Location: 3500 South Lancaster Road; Dallas, Texas 75203
- Coordinates: 32°42′26″N 96°48′4″W
- System: DART rail
- Owner: Dallas Area Rapid Transit
- Platforms: Island platform
- Connections: DART: 217

Construction
- Parking: 465 free spaces, no overnight
- Cycle facilities: One rack
- Accessible: Yes

History
- Opened: May 31, 1997

Services
Preceding station	DART	Following station
VA Medical Center toward UNT Dallas	Blue Line	Illinois toward Downtown Rowlett
Location

Kiest station is a DART rail station in Dallas, Texas. It serves the Oak Cliff neighborhood on Kiest Boulevard and Lancaster Road (SH 342). It opened on May 31, 1997, and is a station on the Blue Line, serving nearby residences and businesses.
