= Kidd Springs, Dallas =

Neighborhood of Texas, United States

Kidd Springs

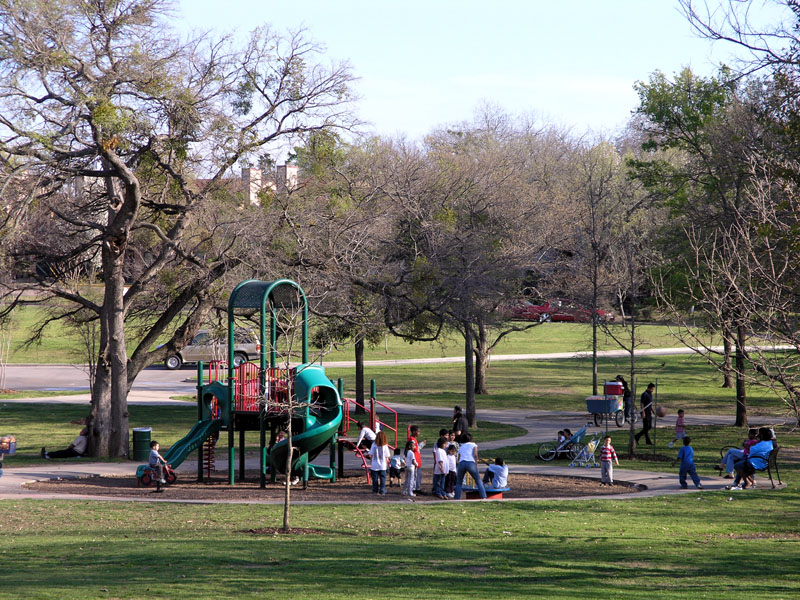
Kidd Springs Park

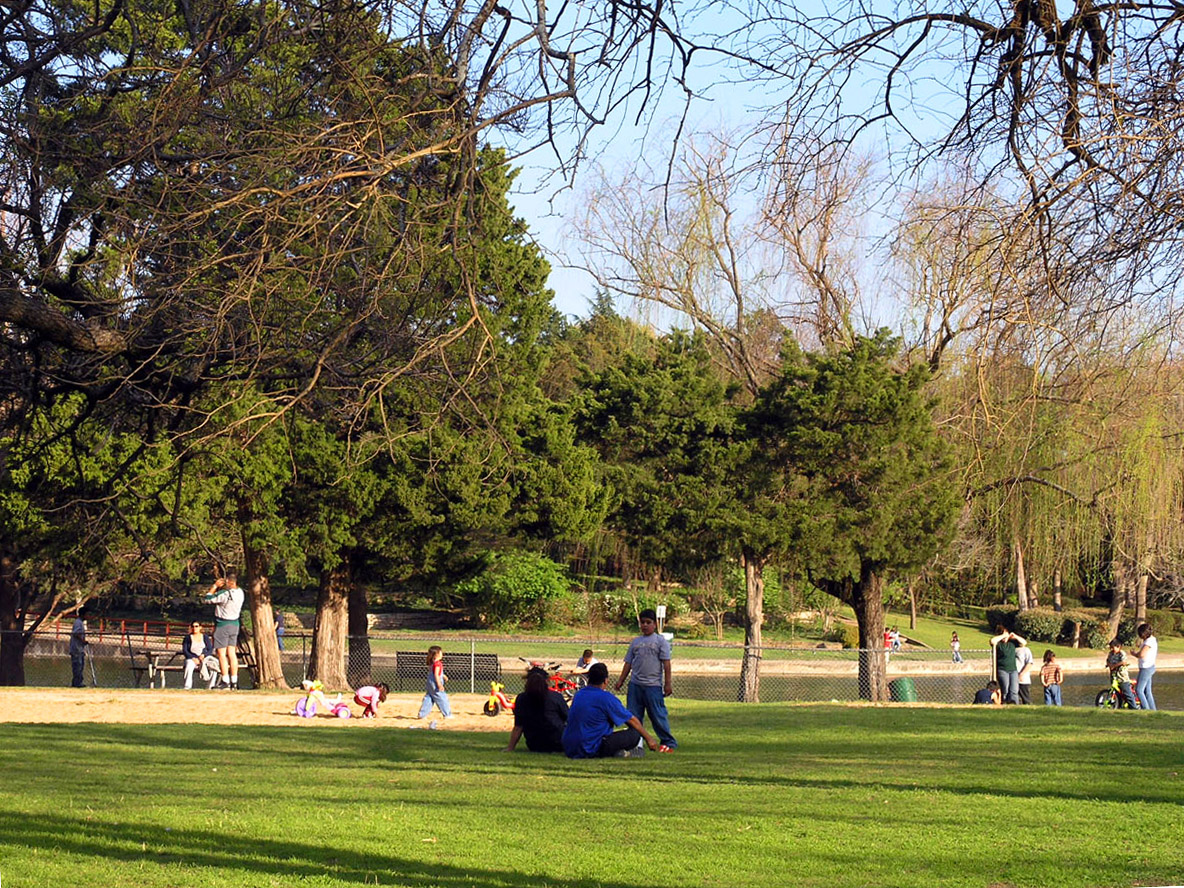
Another view of the park, showing the park's lake

Kidd Springs is a neighborhood in the North Oak Cliff area of Dallas, Texas (USA). James Kidd purchased land in the area in the 1870s which included the spring now bearing his name.

It is also home to a park/recreation area of the same name. The park had its beginnings as a private park in 1895 when the Kidd Springs Fishing & Boating Club began construction of the small spring fed lake. The park became part of the Dallas Parks and Recreation system in 1947.

The Kidd Springs Neighborhood is roughly bounded by Zang Boulevard on the East, Tyler Street on the West, Colorado Boulevard on the North, and West Davis Street (SH 180) on the South. Within the boundaries of Kidd Springs is Miller and Stemmons Historic District which is listed on the National Register of Historic Places. Both Kessler Park neighborhood and the Bishop Arts District are near Kidd Springs.
