= Ferris Plaza =

Public park located in downtown in Dallas, Texas, United States

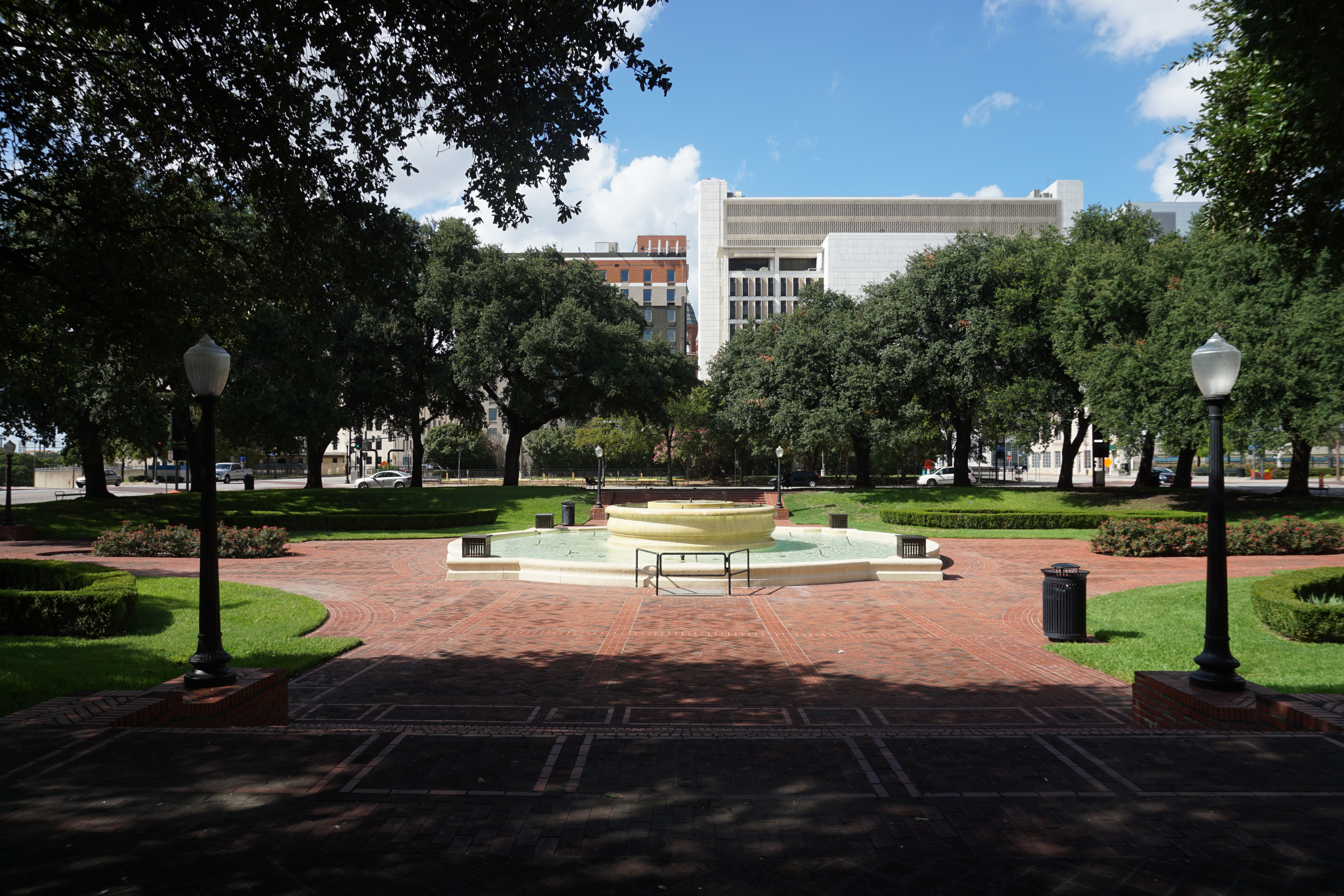
- Ferris Plaza Park in 2016
- Interactive map of Ferris Plaza
- Type: Public
- Location: 400 South Houston St, Dallas, Texas
- Coordinates: 32°46′35″N 96°48′24″W
- Area: 0.9-acre (3,600 m^{2})
- Operated by: City of Dallas
- Status: open all year

Ferris Plaza is a 0.9-acre (0.36 ha) public park located in downtown Dallas, Texas, United States. The park is located to the east of the Dallas Union Station, between Wood Street and Young Street.

== History ==
Ferris Plaza was originally proposed in the Kessler Plan in 1910 as a green space in front of the Union Station. The park was named after Royal Andrew Ferris, a banker and railroad entrepreneur in Dallas.
