= Hampton Hills =

Hampton Hills may refer to:

- Hampton Hills, Dallas, Texas
- Hampton Hills, New Jersey
