= Stevens Park Estates, Dallas =

Stevens Park Estates
- Country: United States
- State: Texas
- Counties: Dallas
- City: Dallas
- Area: Kessler
- Elevation: 489 ft (149 m)
- ZIP code: 75208
- Area codes: 214, 469, 972
- Website: http://www.stevenspark.org/

Stevens Park Estates is a neighborhood in north Oak Cliff, Dallas, Texas, United States.

Annie L. Stevens began the development of the neighborhood in 1925, with help from her brother Walter, on land she inherited from her parents. Before platting the neighborhood, Annie donated 40 acres to the city of Dallas for the establishment of Stevens Memorial Park, named in honor of her parents Dr. John H. and Mary Armstrong Stevens. Much of the original park is now Stevens Park Golf Course.

The Stevens Park Estates addition was planned as part of the Kessler District, a series of parks and neighborhoods through the lower watershed of the Coombs Creek, part of the Kessler Plan concept.

In 2018, Stevens Park Estates became the 20th conservation district in Dallas.
