= Oak Cliff =

Neighborhood of Dallas, Texas, U.S.

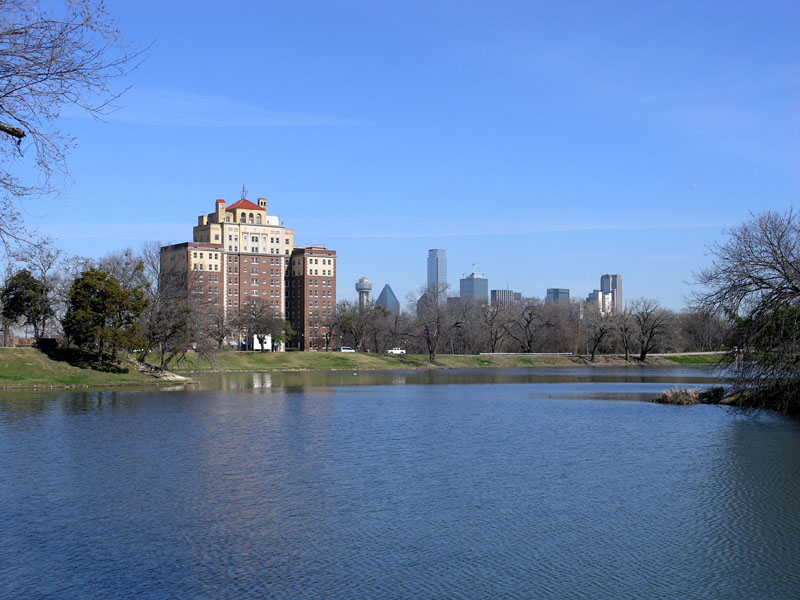
Downtown Dallas as seen from Lake Cliff Park.

Oak Cliff is a neighborhood located in Dallas, Texas, United States that was formerly a separate town in Dallas County; established in 1887 and annexed by Dallas in 1903, Oak Cliff has retained a distinct identity as one of Dallas' older established neighborhoods.

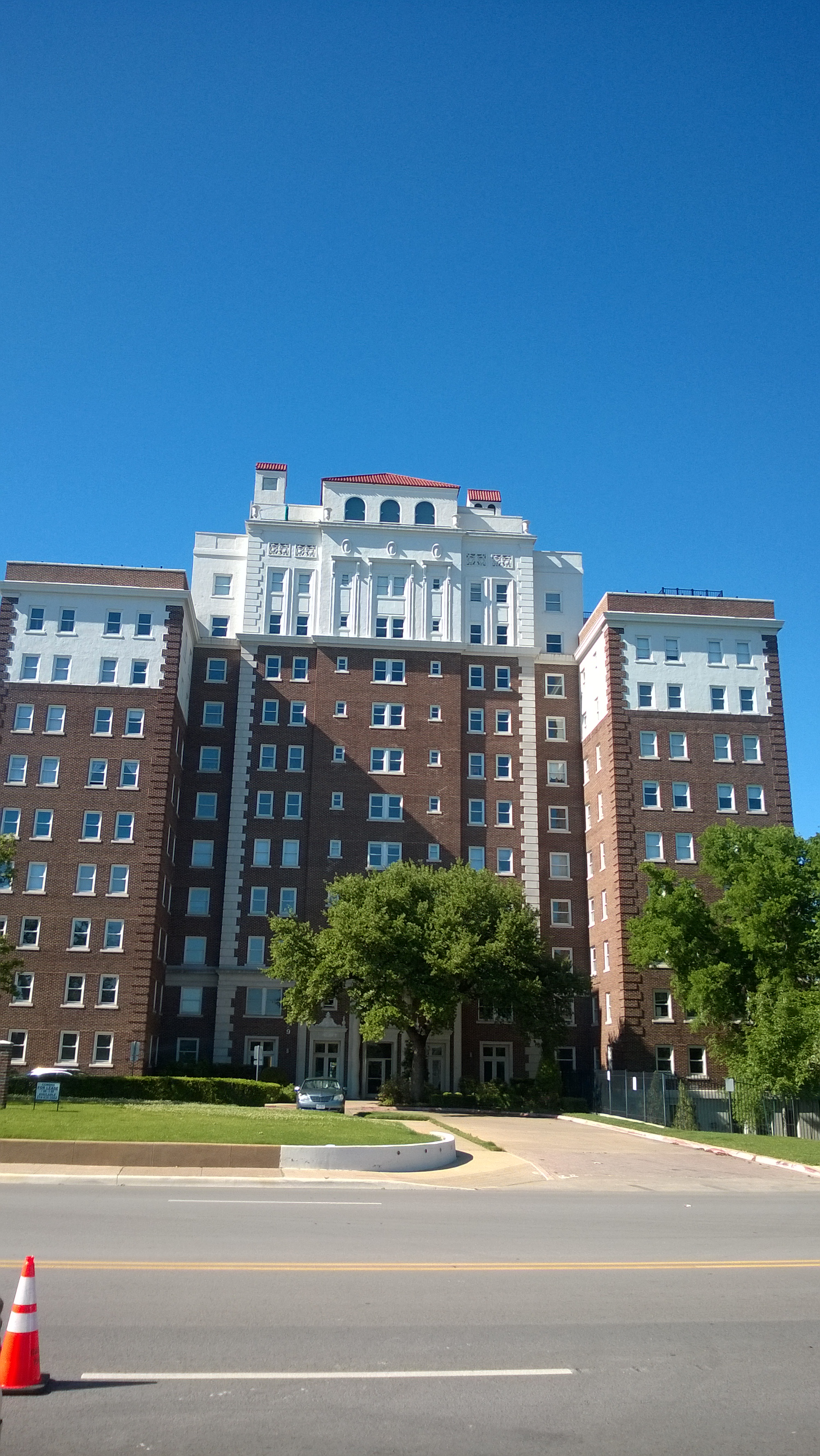
Lake Cliff Condominiums in Oak Cliff.

Oak Cliff has neighborhoods dating to the turn and middle of the 20th century, as well as many parks, and is adjacent to the central business district of downtown Dallas.

The boundaries of Oak Cliff are roughly Interstate 30 on the north, Loop 12 on the west, Interstate 45 on the east, the Trinity River on the northeast and Interstate 20 on the south. No officially recognized or universally accepted boundaries exist for what constitutes Oak Cliff.

== History ==
Oak Cliff was founded in 1887, when John S. Armstrong and Thomas L. Marsalis bought a farm of 320 acres (1.3 km^{2}) on the west side of the Trinity River for $8,000. The farm was subdivided into 20-acre (81,000 m^{2}) blocks, and the plat of the new town made. Armstrong and Marsalis began to develop the land into an elite residential area, which proved to be a success by the end of 1887, with sales surpassing $60,000. After a disagreement between the partners, Marsalis secured complete control over Oak Cliff's development. Armstrong went on to create his own elite residential development on the north side of Dallas, known as Highland Park.

According to the first plat filed, the original township of Oak Cliff extended as far north as First Street, later named Colorado Boulevard just north of Lake Cliff, then known as Spring Lake, and as far south as a pavilion below 13th Street. It was bounded on the east by Miller Street, later named Cliff Street, and on the west by Beckley Avenue. Jefferson Boulevard was the route of a steam railroad, and the principal north-south thoroughfare was Marsalis Avenue, then called Grand Street.

On November 1, 1887, lots worth $23,000 were sold in the newly opened Marsalis Addition (Oak Cliff) before noon, and on the following day, 91 lots were sold for $38,113. Figures published later in November gave the new suburb a population of 500. Marsalis developed the Oak Cliff Elevated Railway to provide the first transportation link to his new development, using a small shuttle train pulled by a "dummy" engine. The transportation system was modeled on one in New York City and was promoted as "the first elevated railway in the South". The railroad ran special trains to Oak Cliff Park, the home ground of the Dallas Hams. In reality, the railroad operated at ground level almost its entire course down Jefferson Boulevard and towards Lake Cliff; it only became slightly elevated as it crossed the Trinity River. This steam railway was continued for many years for commuters and pleasure seekers. Marsalis began two other development projects with the intent to promote Oak Cliff as a vacation resort. One was Oak Cliff Park, later called Marsalis Park and Zoo, a 150-acre (0.6 km^{2}) park that included a two-mile-long (3 km) lake and a 2,000-seat pavilion in which dances and operas were held. Another was the Park Hotel, modeled after the Hotel del Coronado in San Diego, which included several mineral baths fed by artesian wells.

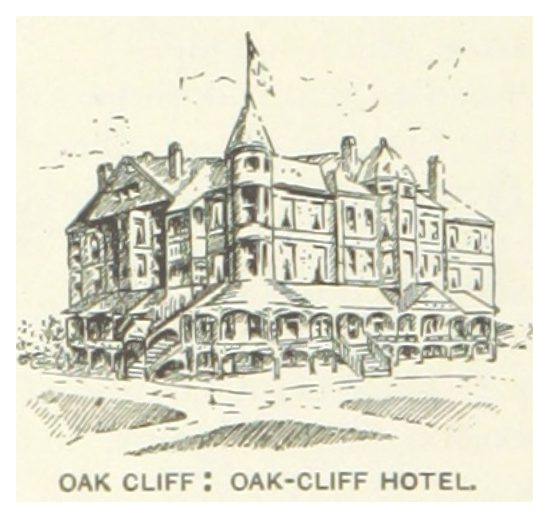
The hotel c. 1890

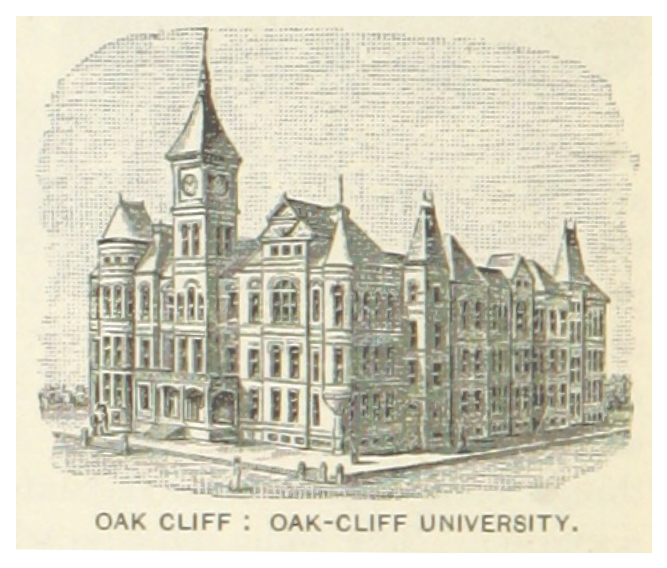
The Female University Projekt of T. L. Marsalis, president of the Dallas Land and Loan Company (c. 1890)

Oak Cliff incorporated in 1890 with a population of 2,470, and secured a post office, which operated until 1896. The community had four grocery stores, two meat markets, a hardware store, and a feed store. Businesses included the Texas Paper Mills Company (later Fleming and Sons), Oak Cliff Planing Mill, Oak Cliff Artesian Well Company, Patton's Medicinal Laboratories, and the Oak Cliff Ice and Refrigeration Company. A number of new elite residential areas developed by the Dallas Land and Loan Company had pushed the community's boundaries westward to Willomet Street. Oak Cliff's first mayor was Hugh Ewing. In 1891, the community's first newspaper, the Oak Cliff Sunday Weekly, was published by F. N. Oliver.

Over the next three years, Oak Cliff's development continued, but during the depression of 1893, the demand for vacation resorts decreased, and the community's growth stagnated, forcing Marsalis into bankruptcy. Consequently, the Park Hotel was converted into the Oak Cliff College for Young Ladies. Another educational institution, the Patton Seminary, was established two years later by Dr. Edward G. Patton. By 1900, Oak Cliff was already no longer an elite residential and vacation community. Many of the lots once owned by the Dallas Land and Loan Company were subdivided by the Dallas and Oak Cliff Real Estate Company and sold to the middle and working classes, a trend which lasted well into the early 1900s. The census of 1900 reported Oak Cliff's population as 3,640.

In 1902, an interurban electric streetcar line controlled by the Northern Texas Traction Company was constructed passing through Oak Cliff and connected Dallas to Fort Worth. This line discontinued service in the late 1930s. Smaller residential streetcar service ran throughout Oak Cliff's neighborhoods, spanning over 20 miles (32 km). Known as a streetcar suburb, Oak Cliff's characteristic twists and turns are largely due to the area's topography, and the paths and turnabouts created by the streetcar service. Residential streetcar service ended in January 1956.

Oak Cliff was annexed by Dallas in 1903, after numerous attempts beginning in 1900. The proposal had met with little success, until the community's depressed economy produced a vote in favor of annexation by 18 votes. In April 1908, the Trinity River flooded its banks, rising to a height of 37.8 feet (11.5 m) by April 21; rains continued into May, finally raising the river's height to 51.3 feet (15.6 m). The only bridge remaining that connected Oak Cliff with Dallas after the flood was the Zang Boulevard Turnpike, an earthen fill with a single steel span across the river channel, slightly to the north of the present Houston Street Viaduct. About this time, George B. Dealey, publisher of the Dallas Morning News, returned from a trip to Kansas City with the idea of securing for Dallas an intracity causeway similar to the one there. From his proposal sprang the Houston Street Viaduct (originally named the Oak Cliff Viaduct), begun October 24, 1910, and opened to traffic February 22, 1912, acclaimed as the longest concrete bridge in the world. (This latter designation was later disputed as a publicity stunt.)

In 1909, a disastrous fire occurred in Oak Cliff, consuming 14 blocks of residences, including the Briggs Sanitorium.

In April 1921, the Ku Klux Klan declared a chapter within Dallas, making themselves known by not only beating and branding a local black hotel elevator operator, but by also parading in downtown Dallas with nearly 800 hooded Klansmen in attendance. The Dallas chapter, known as Klavern 66, moved its meeting hall into Oak Cliff due to a large increase in members shortly after being announced. Klavern 66 was able to spread its influence by producing its own newspaper, Texas 100% American, which was projected to circulate around 18,000 copies. In March 1922, another well-known Ku Klux Klan beating occurred, this time in Oak Cliff, against a tailor named W. J. Gilbert, as reported by the Fort Worth Star-Telegram.

The Great Depression caused Dallas’ economy to suffer, resulting in the Oak Cliff's black community contributing to about one-half of the city's unemployed population. As black people were known to be considered first for layoffs, a need for low-income housing quickly arose. As a result, 86% of Oak Cliff's black population was forced into inhabitingsub-standard housing, commonly located on what was considered as the most undesirable and unlivable parts of Dallas. Violence broke out in Oak Cliff between its black and white citizens over this issue. The Dallas mayor at the time, Woodall Rodgers, was documented as criticizing Oak Cliff's black community for inciting the violence and not being accepting of their residential segregation.

On April 2, 1957, a tornado ripped through Oak Cliff as part of the Early-April 1957 tornado outbreak sequence, killing 10 people and causing more than $1 million ($11.5 million in 2025 dollars) in damages.

== Politics ==
=== Dallas City Council ===
Oak Cliff is represented by four members of the Dallas City Council, of a total of 14 council members for the city as a whole. Using the boundaries described above, two of the council districts fall completely in Oak Cliff (Districts 1 and 4), while two others partially represent Oak Cliff (Districts 3 and 8).

- District 1: Chad West
- District 3: Zarin Gracey
- District 4: Maxie Johnson
- District 8: Tennell Atkins

=== Dallas County Commissioners Court ===
Oak Cliff is represented by two members of the Dallas County Commissioners Court. Both of these commissioners represent other areas of Dallas County, but Oak Cliff is within their district boundaries.

- District 1: Dr. Elba Garcia
- District 3: John Wiley Price

=== Texas House of Representatives ===
Oak Cliff is represented by several members of the Texas Legislature. All of the representatives listed below represent portions of Oak Cliff.

- House District 100: Venton Jones
- House District 103: Rafael Anchia
- House District 104: Jessica Gonzalez
- House District 110: Toni Rose
- House District 111: Yvonne Davis

=== Texas Senate ===
Oak Cliff is represented by two members of the Texas Senate. Senator Royce West represents most of Oak Cliff, while a portion of west Oak Cliff is represented by Senator Nathan Johnson.

- Senate District 16: Nathan Johnson
- Senate District 23: Royce West

== Neighborhoods ==
- Arcadia Park (Dallas)
- Beckley Club Estates
- Beverly Hills
- Bishop Arts District
- Brentwood
- Brettonwoods
- Bronx Park
- Brooklyn Heights
- Carver Heights
- Cedar Crest
- Cedar Haven
- Cedar Oaks
- Crestwood
- Dells District
- Druid Hills
- Elmwood
- El Tivoli Place
- Encinos Park
- Five Mile (Dallas)
- Glen Oaks (Dallas)
- Hampton Hills
- Hideaway Valley
- Kernwood
- Kessler Circle
- Kessler Highlands
- Kessler Park
- Kessler Plaza, Dallas
- Kiest - Polk
- Kiest Square
- Kiestwood
- Kiest Forest Estates
- Kimball Estates
- Kings Highway Conservation District
- Kidd Springs
- Lake Cliff
- Las Haciendas (Marion dr)(Dallas)
- Las Villas (Dallas)
- Legendary Hollow
- Los Encinos
- Loupot Heights
- L.O. Daniel
- Mountain Creek (Dallas)
- North Bishop Avenue Commercial Historic District
- North Cliff
- Oakland Terrace
- Oakland Hills, Woodtown
- Oak Park Estates
- Oak Tree Colony (The Countrytown)
- Pinnacle Park
- Polk Terrace
- Ravinia Heights
- Rolandale
- Ruthmeade Place
- Skyline Heights
- Southern Hills
- Stevens Park Estates
- Stevens Park Village
- Summit Lawn
- Sunset Crest
- Sunset Hills (Dallas)
- Tenth Street Historic District
- The Bottoms
- The States (Dallas)
- Timbergrove Circle(Kessler Park Dallas)
- Trinity Heights
- Twin Oaks
- Vista Real
- Western Park
- Westmount (Dallas)
- Wheatland Estates
- Winnetka Heights
- Wynnewood

In addition, the Oak Cliff area encompasses Cockrell Hill, a separate municipality that is an enclave of Dallas.

== Transportation ==
=== Light rail ===
- Dallas Area Rapid Transit
  - Dallas Zoo Station
  - Tyler/Vernon Station
  - Hampton Station
  - Westmoreland Station

=== Streetcar ===
The Dallas Streetcar is a 1.6-mile (2.6 km) modern-streetcar line connecting Oak Cliff with downtown Dallas. It opened in April 2015, and extensions are planned.

=== Highways ===
- Interstate 30
- Interstate 35E
- U.S. Highway 67

== Education ==
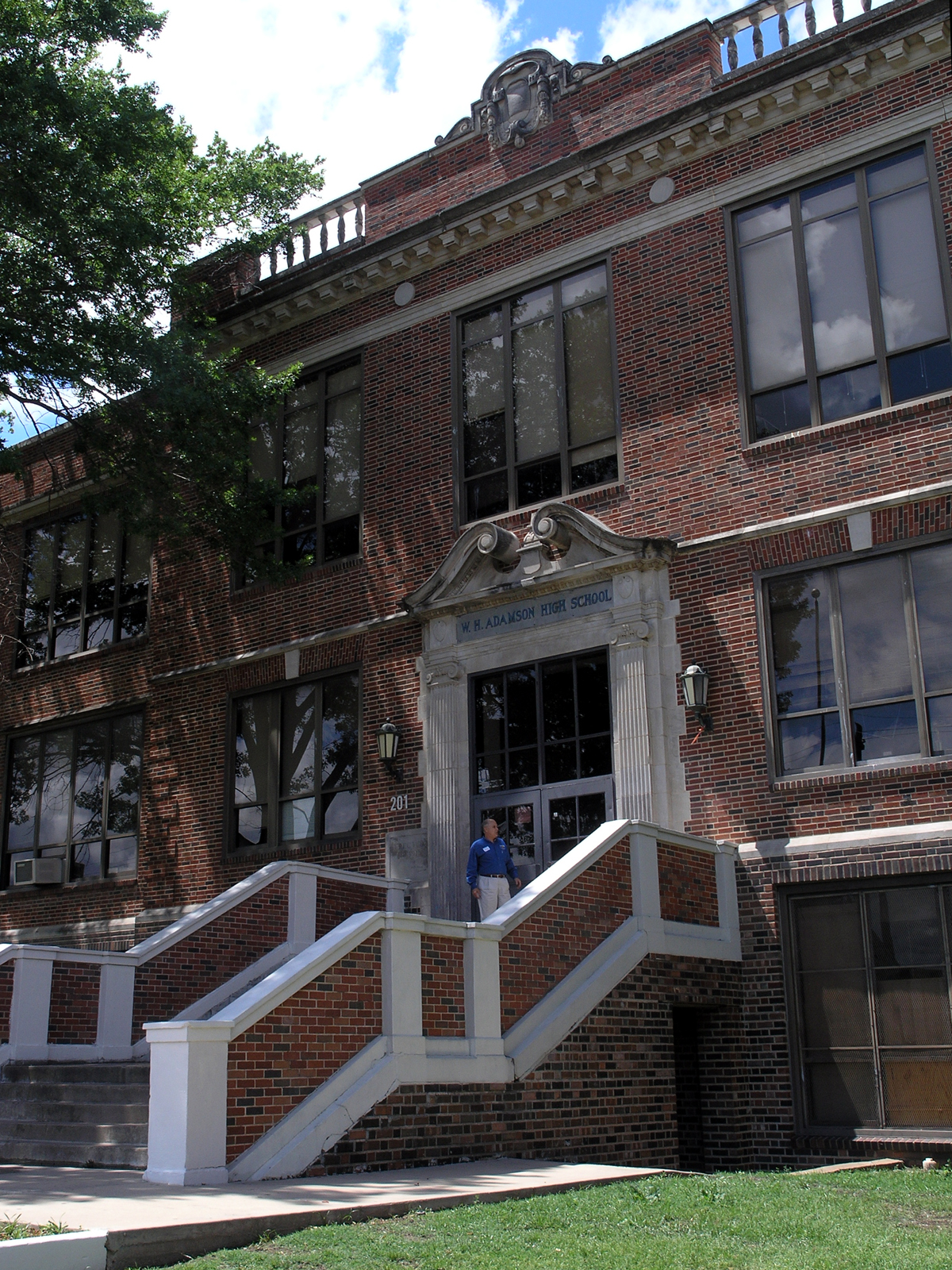
W. H. Adamson High School

=== School desegregation ===
In apprehension to the Brown vs. Board of Education Supreme Court ruling in 1954, the city of Dallas resisted desegregating their schools with the help of federal judges such as Judge William H. Atwell, the chief judge of the United States District Court for the Northern District of Texas. To combat the inevitability of desegregation of schools, Dallas in 1961 initiated a "Stairstep Plan". The proposed plan stated that all Dallas Independent School District (DISD) schools would begin desegregation one grade level per year, beginning with the first grade. DISD declared all of its schools desegregated in 1967, which was later found to be inherently false. In July 1971, of the total 180 DISD schools, 159 schools were found to meet the criteria to be classified as a one-race school (90% of the student population being either Black, Mexican American or Anglo). At the conclusion of the case in August 1971, Judge William M. Taylor of the District Court for the Northern District ruled in favor of a majority-to-minority transfer program. The program stated that all DISD students who attended schools where their race made up the majority of the student population would integrate into schools where their race was a minority by offering free transportation by bus. For the next few decades, Oak Cliff schools, along with those in South Dallas, became the focus of a long-running and bitter court battle over desegregation, one overseen by federal judge Barefoot Sanders. All of DISD's schools were officially declared desegregated by the city in 2003.

=== Public ===
The Dallas Independent School District operates district public schools.

Zoned high schools within the Oak Cliff area:

- W.H. Adamson High School - 4A - Western (The replacement campus opened in 2012)
- Sunset High School - 5A
- Franklin D. Roosevelt High School - 4A - eastern
- South Oak Cliff High School - 5A - southern
- David W. Carter High School - 5A
- Justin F. Kimball High School - 4A
- Moisés E. Molina High School - 5A
- A.W Brown Fellowship Leadership Academy Charter School

Optional high schools within the Oak Cliff area:

- New Tech High School
- Barack Obama Male Leadership Academy (all male)
- Yvonne A. Ewell Townview Magnet Center
- Dr. Frederick D. Haynes III Global Preparatory Academy at Paul Quinn College
- Kathlyn Joy Gilliam Collegiate Academy

In 2011, the district closed Maynard Jackson Middle School. Prior to summer 2011, the community often complained about poor conditions at the school. DISD rezoned the students to Kennedy Curry Middle School in southern Dallas.

Zan Wesley Holmes Jr. Middle School, which opened in 2012, is in Oak Cliff.

Rosemont Elementary School is located in North Oak Cliff. In 2015, The Dallas Morning News wrote that it had "strong academics, passionate students, and devoted parents" and that it "is considered a neighborhood gem in North Oak Cliff". The parents stated that principal Anna Brining had worked to make the school strong; in 2015, the DISD notified Brining that her contract would not be renewed.

In addition, Life School, a state charter-school operator, has a kindergarten-grade 12 Oak Cliff campus.

=== Private ===
==== High schools ====
- Bishop Dunne Catholic School - TAPPS
- Tyler Street Christian Academy - TAPPS

==== Postsecondary ====
- University of North Texas at Dallas
- Paul Quinn College
- Christ for the Nations Institute
- Mountain View College (part of the Dallas College system)

== In popular culture ==
Oak Cliff has been home to a long list of musicians. When T-Bone Walker made his debut with Columbia in 1929, he lived in Oak Cliff and recorded as Oak Cliff T-Bone. Edie Brickell's second album included a song about life in Oak Cliff titled "Oak Cliff Bra". Other musicians from Oak Cliff include Michael Martin Murphey, Yella Beezy, Stevie Ray Vaughan, B. W. Stevenson, The D.O.C., Ray Wylie Hubbard and Jimmie Vaughan. The experimental death metal quintet Mē◦āt◦us was also from Oak Cliff. Actors Yvonne Craig (television's first Batgirl) and Stephen Tobolowsky lived in Oak Cliff.

Oak Cliff is home to the Sour Grapes art collective, founded by Carlos Donjuan, with his brothers Arturo and Miguel in 2000. The collective has murals throughout the Dallas area.

Former NBA Player and now Hall of Famer Dennis Rodman grew up in Oak Cliff.

Omar Gonzalez, a defender for Toronto in Major League Soccer and the U.S. national team, was born and raised in Oak Cliff.

Oak Cliff is the home of the Texas Theatre, located in West Jefferson Boulevard, where former resident Lee Harvey Oswald, the man suspected of killing U.S. President John F. Kennedy and shooting Dallas Police officer JD Tippit at 10th and Patton Streets, was arrested. The theater has appeared in many books and movies on the Kennedy assassination, including Oliver Stone's 1991 film, JFK. On November 22, 1963, Warren "Butch" Burroughs, who ran the concession stand at the theatre, said that Oswald came into the theater between 1:00 and 1:07 pm; he also claimed he sold Oswald popcorn at 1:15 pm. Julia Postal later said that Burroughs initially told her the same thing, although he later denied this. Theatre patron Jack Davis also corroborated Burroughs' time, claiming he observed Oswald in the theatre prior to 1:20 pm.

Oak Cliff is the setting of City Limit; the novel by Lantzee Miller is a coming-of-age story and metaphorical portrait of the beginning of Oak Cliff's recent rebirth and self-redefinition.
