= Trinity Park =

Trinity Park may refer to:

- Trinity Park, Queensland, a suburb of Cairns, Australia
- Trinity Park, Texas, an unincorporated community in the United States
- Trinity Historic District, a historic neighborhood in Durham, North Carolina
- Trinity Park (Baseball Park), a former minor league baseball park that was located in Dallas, Texas.
