= Beckley Club Estates =

Coordinates: 32°43′48″N 96°49′16″W

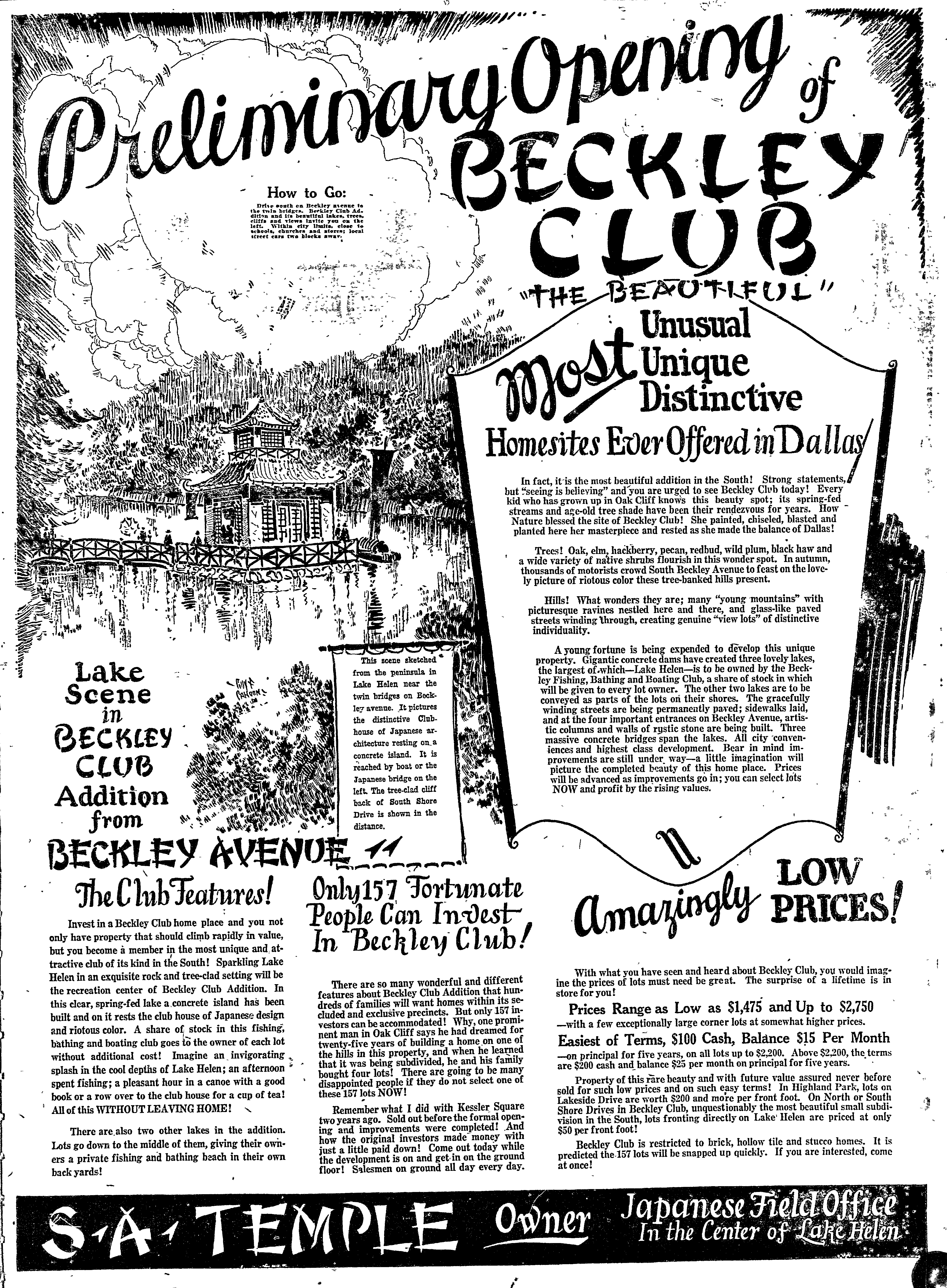
Advertisements for the Beckley Club Estates neighborhood.

Beckley Club Estates is a neighborhood in the Oak Cliff area of Dallas, Texas. The area, built by Curtis Somners Peck and other developers, is composed of bungalow style houses built in the 1920s and 1950s along winding, hilly streets in Central Oak Cliff. The area's boundaries consist of North Shore to the north, Beckley to the west, Arizona Ave. to the East and Iowa Ave. to the south. The area is one of the quickest appreciating areas in the 75216 ZIP code.

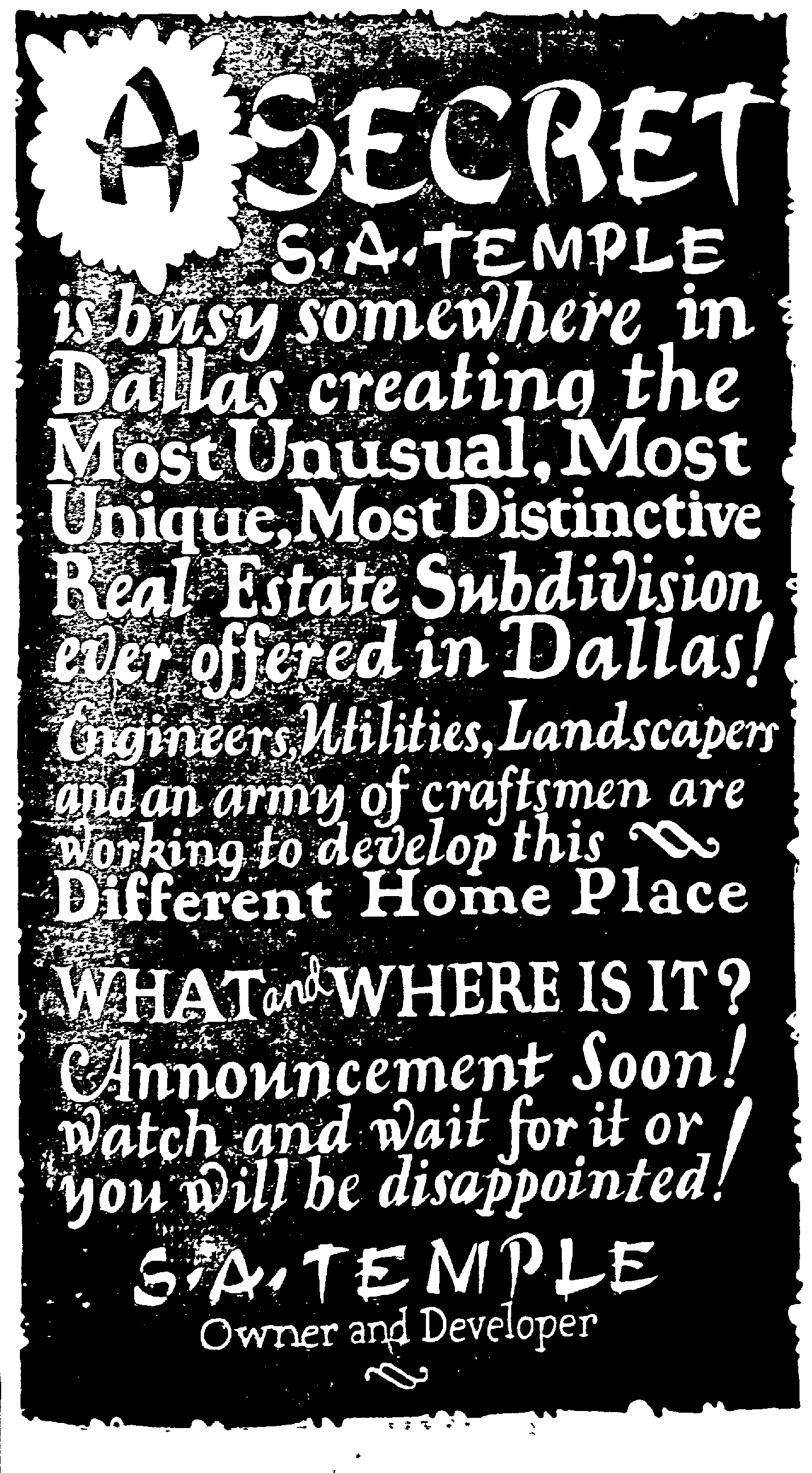
Posted used for advertising Beckley Club Estates.

== Peacocks ==
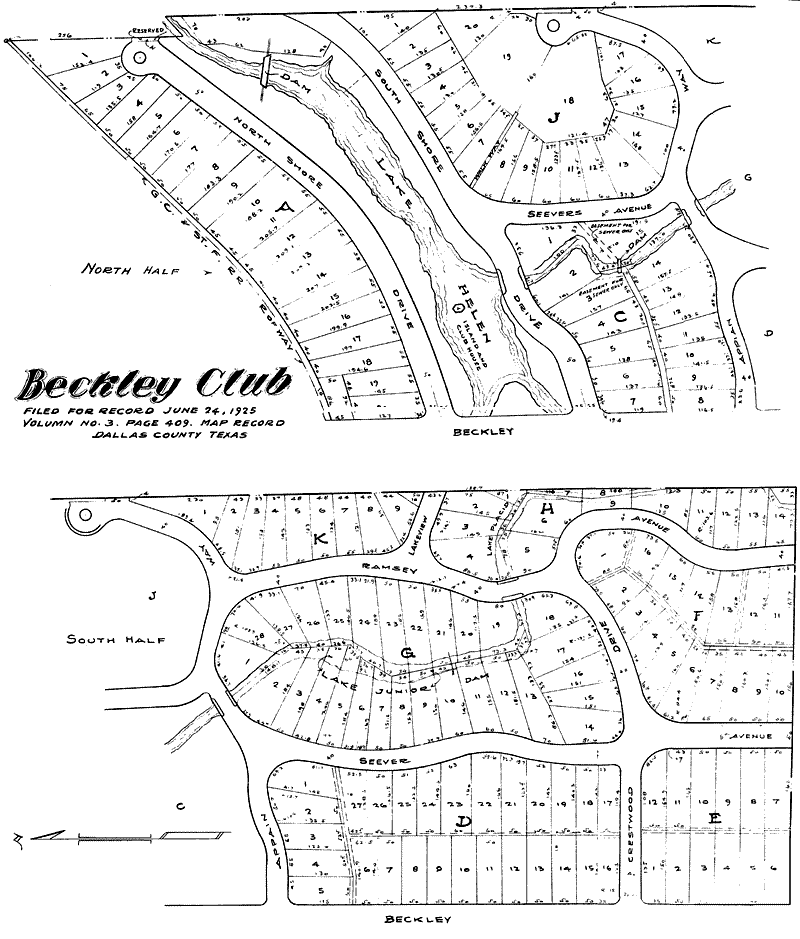
Original lot plans for the Beckley Club Estates neighborhood.

Beckley Club Estates is home to an ostentation of about 40 peacocks. The neighborhood received international media coverage in 2015 when one of the peacocks was stolen and later returned.
