= John Raleigh Briggs =

American physician and businessman (1851–1907)

- A portrait of John Raleigh Briggs
- Born: 1851; Meigs County, Tennessee
- Died: 1907; Dallas, Texas
- Other name: J. R. Briggs
- Education: Nashville Medical College; Missouri Medical College
- Occupations: Physician and businessman
- Known for: First Westerner to try and describe the effects of peyote, founding of the Briggs Sanitorium

John Raleigh Briggs (1851–1907) was an American physician and businessman based in Dallas, Texas. He was the first Westerner known to have tried and described the effects of peyote, which contains the psychedelic drug mescaline. Briggs learned of peyote from his brother, who had spent years among Native Americans and Mexicans and had observed their entheogenic use of the cactus, describing it as producing "beautiful visions" and allowing them to journey to the "spirit world".

Briggs obtained peyote and tried a very low dose of it in June 1886, subsequently publishing his experience with it in an article titled "Muscale Buttons"—Physiological Effects—Personal Experience" in the Medical Register in May 1887. Briggs ate only one-third of a single peyote button, whereas a typical dose for hallucinogenic effects used by Native Americans was said to be 6 to 10 buttons (an 18- to 30-fold higher dose). Despite the low dose, he developed a variety of severe symptoms, including dramatically increased heart rate, rapid breathing, shortness of breath, feeling intoxicated, brief loss of consciousness, and feeling as if he were near death. Briggs concluded that the drug was a "poison" and was the most "violent" of all substances known to him. However, a modern interpretation is that Briggs was very apprehensive about peyote and simply had an extreme panic attack in response to the drug. As such, Briggs's experience is said to have also been the first psychedelic "bad trip" to have been published. Relatedly, Briggs held strong negative preconceptions about peyote, believing it be dangerous and easily lethal. As examples, he claimed that the drug induced total unconsciousness in Native Americans for 2 or 3 days, that it had once killed 30 Native Americans in a single ceremony, and that he believed that a mere 2 peyote buttons would surely kill a white man like himself.

Briggs's publication on his experience with peyote was read by George Davis, of Parke, Davis and Company, who proceeded to write Briggs and obtain peyote buttons from him in June 1887. Based on Briggs's experience, Parke-Davis attempted to market peyote as a cardiac stimulant and for other uses, but these efforts met with little success. The German pharmacologist Louis Lewin obtained peyote buttons from Parke-Davis during a trip to the United States in 1887 and began studying them and sharing his findings. These developments eventually led to the first published reports of the hallucinogenic effects of peyote by various authors starting in 1895 and the isolation of mescaline from peyote by the German pharmacologist Arthur Heffter in 1897 and publication of these findings in 1898. As such, although the entheogenic use of peyote had already been observed and described by Spanish colonialists in the 1500s and the cactus was already botanically known since the 1840s, Briggs is credited with introducing peyote to the Western world.

Aside from his work with peyote, Briggs is known for founding the Briggs Sanitorium in Dallas, Texas in 1896. In addition, he established and was the editor of the Texas Health Journal for many years. Briggs was also involved in local Dallas politics. He died in 1907 at the age 56.

== See also ==
- Briggs Sanitorium
- Psychedelic drug § The phenethylamine psychedelic mescaline
- Mescaline § History
- History of LSD § Bicycle Day
- James Mooney
- Carl Sofus Lumholtz
