= Stevens Township =

Stevens Township may refer to:

- Stevens Township, Stevens County, Minnesota
- Stevens Township, Ramsey County, North Dakota
- Stevens Township, Pennsylvania

== See also ==
- Stevens (disambiguation)
