= Robert Decherd =

American businessman (born 1951)

Robert Decherd (born 1951) is an American businessman. From 1987 to 2013, he served as the chairman of the board, president, and chief executive officer of A. H. Belo Corporation of Dallas, which owns newspapers in North Texas, most notably The Dallas Morning News.

== Education ==
Decherd graduated from St. Mark's School of Texas, where he was editor of the school newspaper. He then attended Harvard, where he became president of The Harvard Crimson and Orator of his class.

== Career ==
Decherd became Belo's chairman and chief executive officer in January 1987. He became president of Belo in January 1994; he had previously served as president from January 1985 through December 1986. From January 1984 through December 1986, he served as chief operating officer. In these roles, he oversaw Belo's listing as a public company with the New York Stock Exchange in 1983, as well as the biggest transaction in the company's history, Belo's acquisition of The Providence Journal Company in 1997. Decherd retired from Belo in 2013, after having started in the newspaper business upon his graduation from college forty years earlier.

Decherd is a member of the board of directors, lead director, and chairman of the executive committee of Kimberly-Clark Corporation. He also serves on the advisory council for Harvard University's Center for Ethics and the Professions. He was a member of the Media Security and Reliability Council, which was part of President Bush's Homeland Security initiative.

== Awards ==
Decherd received the Media Institute's 1998 Freedom of Speech Award.

== Personal life ==
Decherd's great-grandfather was George Dealey, the founder of The Dallas Morning News and namesake of Dealey Plaza. His father, H. Ben Decherd, had also been the CEO of Belo.

== See also ==
- Notable alumni of St. Mark's School of Texas
