= Lake Cliff =

Lake of the United States of America

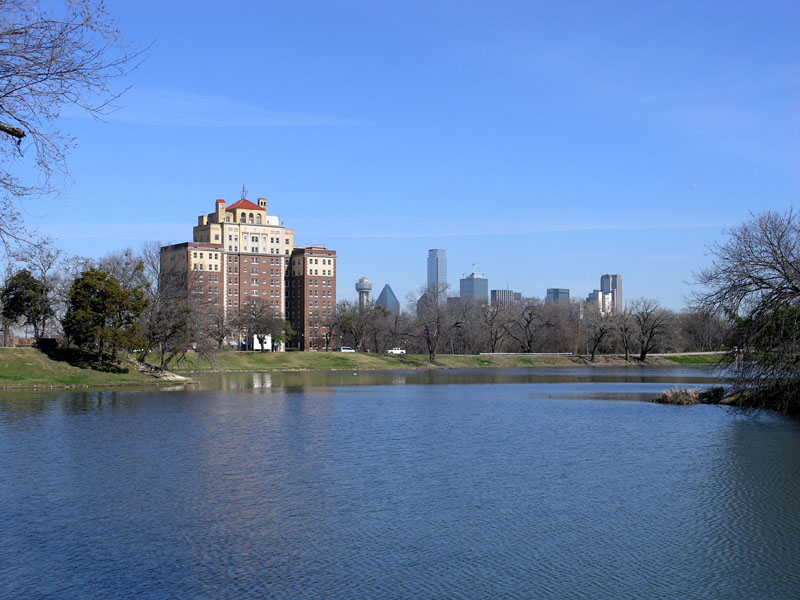
- Downtown Dallas as seen from the lake

- Location within Texas
- Location: Dallas, Texas
- Coordinates: 32°45′27.77″N 96°49′06.57″W
- Type: reservoir
- Basin countries: United States
- Surface elevation: 134 m (440 ft)
- Settlements: Dallas

Lake Cliff is a freshwater lake in the northern part of the Oak Cliff area of Dallas, Texas (USA).

== Location ==
Lake Cliff is located inside the Marsalis, Beckley, West Davis, Zang Boundaries.

== History ==
Lake Cliff was constructed between 1899 and 1900 and was originally called "Lake Llewellyn." It is speculated that Thomas L. Marsalis originally helped to plan the construction of the lake in the summer of 1899. In July 1900, Marsalis sued the lake's builders citing "errors in construction."
