= Carlos Donjuan =

Mexican-American artist

Carlos Donjuan is a Mexican American graffiti artist, painter, and art teacher at University of Texas at Arlington from Oak Cliff, Dallas. He is a part of the Oak Cliff artist collective known as Sour Grapes, which was formed in 2000 with his brothers Arturo and Miguel Donjuan. Donjuan is influenced by hip hop culture, lowrider culture, West Coast graffiti artists, Mexican and Indigenous American folk art. Donjuan's art has been shown internationally and is included in the Chicano art collection of Cheech Marin.

Growing up with undocumented parents, Donjuan recalls that he was introduced at a young age to the term "illegal alien." In his art, he responds to this term: "I thought that there was really aliens out there, you know. I thought they were these weird creatures. And so as an adult now, I’m revisiting that idea of an illegal alien... You want to call struggling people ‘aliens’? I’ll show you aliens."

== Artistic career ==
His career began from a young age, making art in elementary school and starting as a graffiti artist in middle school. Donjuan recalls that he shifted away from doing graffiti without permission when he had a close run-in with police. He and his friends started approaching local business owners, asking if they could paint their walls for free and advertising it as a way to deter taggers because they would probably respect their art. They formed the Sour Grapes art collective and have painted several murals in the Dallas area. Donjuan stated that the purpose of the murals was for young people in the community: "We want to give the kids who walk along there to school something fun to look at, something better than what’s been there."

In 2011, the Dallas Contemporary commissioned Donjuan and the Sour Grapes for a large indoor mural entitled "Rest in Power." Sour Grapes created the mural as a tribute "to the deceased graffiti artists who inspired them, which includes "artists like Beno (aka Jayson Fleenor from Miami) and Tie (aka Jonathan See Lim from San Francisco)." Donjuan transitioned to paintings and creating masks, which have gained international attention. Donjuan states that using masks "all started when a lot of my friends that are graffiti artists, when I would take photos of them in front of their murals, they would always cover their face because graffiti carries the sense of anonymity, and so they didn’t want to be recognized." Donjuan then started incorporating the idea of aliens in his work. His work "Illegal Aliens" has been shown in international galleries. Donjuan states that he hopes his work to keep exploring Mexican American history in relation to understanding himself.
