= Lake Cliff, Dallas =

Lake Cliff
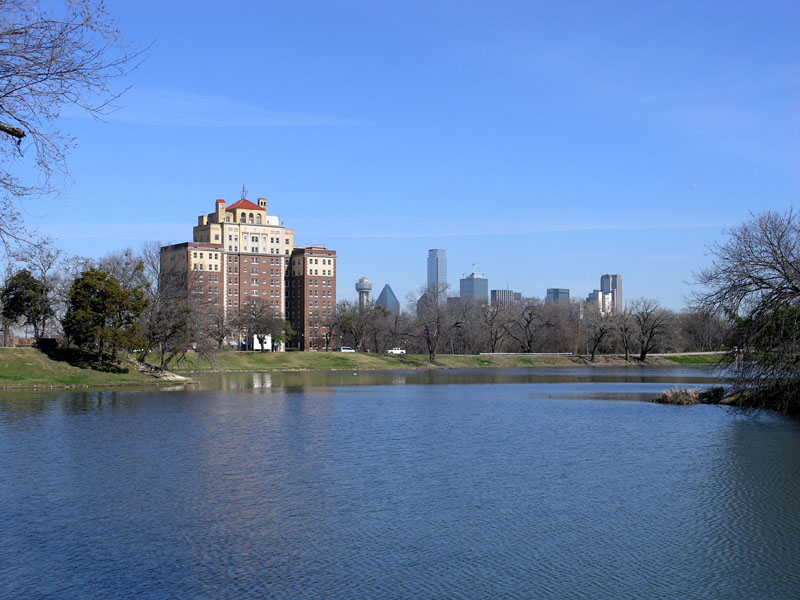
- Downtown Dallas as seen from Lake Cliff

- Location within Texas Location within the United States
- Coordinates: 32°45′23″N 96°49′6″W
- Country: United States
- State: Texas
- County: Dallas
- City: Dallas
- Area: Oak Cliff
- Elevation: 502 ft (153 m)
- ZIP code: 75203
- Area codes: 214, 469, 972
- Lake Cliff Historic District
- U.S. National Register of Historic Places
- U.S. Historic district
- Dallas Landmark
- Location: Roughly bounded by E. 6th St., Beckley Ave., Zangs Blvd. and Marsalis Ave., Dallas, Texas
- Area: 75 acres (30 ha)
- Built: 1888
- Architect: Albert S. Hecht, Robert C. Williams
- Architectural style: Late 19th and Early 20th Century American Movements, Late 19th and 20th Century Revivals, Four Square, Rustic
- MPS: Oak Cliff MPS
- NRHP reference No.: 94000609
- DLMK No.: H/84

Significant dates
- Added to NRHP: June 17, 1994
- Designated DLMK: November 12, 1997
- Website: http://www.lakecliff.org/

Lake Cliff is a neighborhood in the northern part of the Oak Cliff area of Dallas, Texas (USA). It surrounds Lake Cliff, a small freshwater lake. From 1906 to 1913, Oak Cliff was home to an amusement park that, according to its founders, outdid Coney Island. Lake Cliff Park featured a 2,500-seat theater, an 18,000-square-foot roller-skating rink, a roller coaster, Japanese village, mechanical swings, and water rides. Dallasites could take a streetcar link straight to its front door and marvel at the park’s electrical lighting. Today, visitors can still spy remnants of the brick-lined channel.

== See also ==
- National Register of Historic Places listings in Dallas County, Texas
- List of Dallas Landmarks
