= John S. Armstrong =

John Scarborough Armstrong (November 18, 1850 – April 26, 1908) was an American businessman and real estate developer. He was the co-founder (along with Thomas Marsalis) of the former City of Oak Cliff (now incorporated into Dallas) and founder of the town of Highland Park, Texas. Armstrong was also a founder of the State Fair of Texas.

Armstrong was born in 1850, in Nashville, Tennessee, to J. W. and Pauline Armstrong, one of thirteen children. He married Alice J. White in July 1878, in Lancaster, Kentucky. With his brothers, Dr. V. P. Armstrong and Henry C. Armstrong, he established the Armstrong Meat Packing Company, a wholesale grocery business. Around 1906, he purchased land north of Dallas which he planned to develop into a municipality. He had a wife, Alice J., and they had two daughters; Mrs. Minnie May (Edgar L.) Flippen and Mrs. Johnetta (Hugh) Prather. Armstrong's widow and sons-in-law—Edgar Flippen and Hugh Prather continued his work following his death on April 26, 1908, in Dallas, Texas. He is buried at Oakland Cemetery.
