= Cliff Lake (Utah) =

Lake in the state of Utah, United States

- Location within Utah Location within the United States
- Location: Henrys Fork Basin, Summit County, Utah
- Coordinates: 40°47′28″N 110°24′27″W
- Basin countries: United States
- Surface elevation: 3,490 m (11,450 ft)

Cliff Lake is a lake in Summit County, Utah, United States, located in the Henrys Fork Basin of the Uinta Mountains near Mount Powell.
