= Slide Lake (Idaho) =

Small alpine lake in Elmore County, Idaho, US

- Location within Idaho Location within the United States
- Location: Elmore County, Idaho
- Coordinates: 43°56′23″N 115°07′35″W
- Type: Glacial
- Primary outflows: Unnamed stream to Queens River to Middle Fork Boise River
- Basin countries: United States
- Max. length: 0.06 mi (0.097 km)
- Max. width: 0.06 mi (0.097 km)
- Surface elevation: 8,560 ft (2,610 m)

Slide Lake is a small alpine lake in Elmore County, Idaho, United States, located in the Sawtooth Mountains in the Sawtooth National Recreation Area. The lake is accessed from Sawtooth National Forest trail 458 along the Queens River.

Slide Lake is in the Sawtooth Wilderness, and a wilderness permit can be obtained at a registration box at trailheads or wilderness boundaries. Slide Lake is 0.08 mi (0.13 km) southwest and upstream of Cliff Lake.

== See also ==
- List of lakes of the Sawtooth Mountains (Idaho)
- Sawtooth National Forest
- Sawtooth National Recreation Area
- Sawtooth Range (Idaho)
