= L. O. Daniel, Dallas =

Coordinates: 32°44′53.36″N 96°51′06.94″W

L.O. Daniel
- Interactive map of L.O. Daniel
- Country: United States
- State: Texas
- Counties: Dallas
- City: Dallas
- Area: Oak Cliff
- Elevation: 558 ft (170 m)
- ZIP code: 75208
- Area codes: 214, 469, 972

L.O. Daniel is a neighborhood in northern Oak Cliff, Dallas, Texas.

The neighborhood is bounded by Hampton Road on the west, Jefferson Boulevard and on the south, Rosemont Avenue on the east and Davis Street (SH 180) on the north.

Adjacent neighborhoods include Winnetka Heights, West Kessler and Sunset Hills.

== History ==
The neighborhood is named for Lark Owen Daniel, a successful Dallas businessman who in 1901 purchased the 27-acre plot of land that would become L.O. Daniel.

Daniel's original 1905 homestead Cedar Crest still stands, and was named a historical landmark in 1984.

The parcel would be subdivided and developed multiple times over the ensuing decades - LO Daniel is composed mainly of single family houses built from the 1920s to the 1940s, including multiple houses designed by Charles Dilbeck. The majority of the Rosemont Crest Historic District, listed in the National Register of Historic Places, lies within the L.O. Daniel neighborhood.
