= Briggs Sanitorium =

Geography
- Location: Oak Cliff, Texas, United States
- Coordinates: 32.743412°N 96.837664°W

Organization
- Type: Specialist

Services
- Beds: 60
- Speciality: Tuberculosis

History
- Opened: 1896
- Closed: 1909
- Demolished: 1909

Links
- Lists: Hospitals in Texas

Briggs Sanitorium, or Briggs' Sanitarium, was a sanitorium for the treatment of tuberculosis in Oak Cliff, Texas, United States. It was developed in 1896 by John Raleigh Briggs and was located at the corner of Jefferson and Tyler streets, in Oak Cliff, Texas. Noted as the first hospital built in Oak Cliff, it included five wings, containing fifty-two rooms.

== History ==
John Raleigh Briggs founded the Briggs Sanitorium for the treatment of tuberculosis in 1896. The sanitorium was located in the 200 block of South Tyler Street in Oak Cliff, now a neighborhood of Dallas, Texas. The site was selected for its clean air and dry environment, thought ease the symptoms of tuberculosis patients. It was he first hospital built in Oak Cliff.

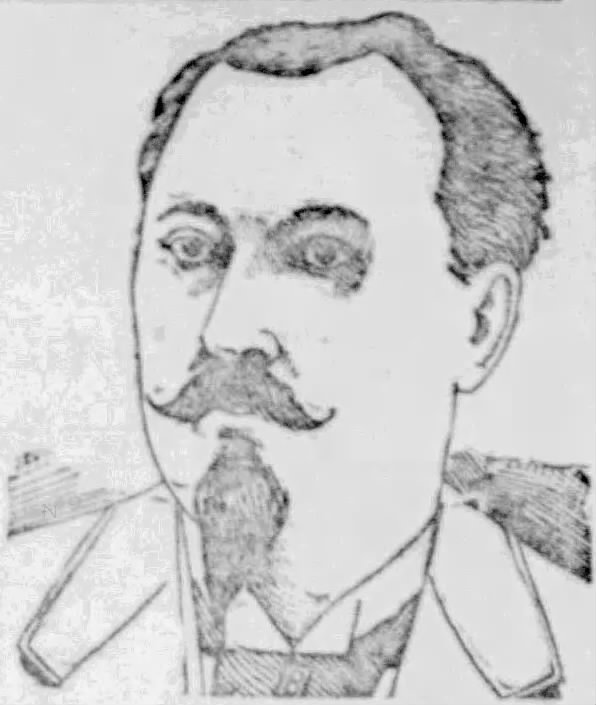
John Raleigh Briggs, circa 1895

Briggs served as the sanatorium's medical director. Briggs received his medical degree from the Nashville Medical College in 1873, a specialist degree in ear, eye, nose, and throat medicine from the Missouri Medical College in 1880. In 1882, he moved to Dallas and operated the North Texas Infirmary, specializing in the diseases of the eye and ear. He also spent several terms on the Dallas City Council and a term as the Mayor of Dallas, while also practicing as an oculist, aurist, and consulting specialist to Parkland Hospital.

After studying at various hospitals in Europe, Briggs was one of the first doctors in the United States who used the practices of Robert Koch of Berlin, Germany. Koch has proved that bacteria caused tuberculosis, instead of the popular theory of the era that the disease was hereditary. Briggs vaccinated his patients with "Koch serum" made from Tubercule bacillus, which could cure patients in the early stages of the disease. Briggs Sanitarium was widely known for curing patients and would accept patients with pulmonary tuberculosis and who were considered "hopeless cases".

Briggs was also among the first American doctors to adopt Koch's practices, which could cure people in the early stages of tuberculosis with vaccinations. The sanitarium manufactured its serums and cultures; its staff tested its medicines on guinea pigs. Briggs also was the first medical doctor to experiment with peyote, publishing an article about its psychedelic effects in the Texas Health Journal.

After Briggs died in December 1907, his wife continued to operate the sanitarium. On April 3, 1909, the Briggs Sanitorium burned down in a fire, which started in the sanitarium's laboratory and continued to engulf fourteen city blocks. The sanitorium's losses totaled $75,000 ($2,687,500 in 2024 currency) for its buildings and furnishings.

== Architecture ==
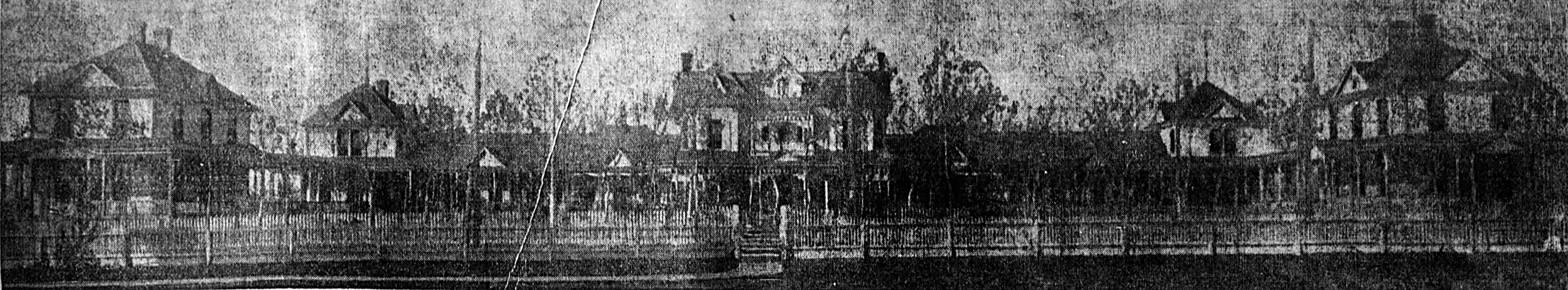
Briggs Sanitorium in Oak Cliff, Texas, circa 1907

Briggs Sanitarium was built four miles outside of Dallas, on the highest point of the county, with views of the countryside. It consisted of three 520 feet (160 m) long buildings, arranged to form a U-shape. This formed a veranda that was 875 square feet (81.3 m^{2}), designed as a "pleasant promenade for convalescents in all kinds of weather." The building originally had rooms for twelve patients but had expanded to sixty rooms by 1907. The sanitarium had five wings and was designed to be well-ventilated. Briggs Sanitarium also included a laboratory where serums were manufactured in incubators.
