= Thomas Marsalis =

American land developer

Thomas Lafayette Marsalis (October 4, 1852 – April 20, 1919) was an American developer. With John S. Armstrong, the founder of Oak Cliff, he was one of the key developers of what is now known as the Dallas area.

== Early life ==
Marsalis was born in Amite County, Mississippi, near New Orleans, Louisiana. The Marsalis family were Dutch Reformed who had immigrated to North America in 1661. They had settled in New Jersey before Thomas Marsalis's grandfather moved to Mississippi.

Marsalis spent his childhood in Louisiana. He moved to Corsicana, Texas, where Marsalis and a partner started a wholesale grocery house. In 1872 he moved to Dallas to start his own wholesale business. This was reportedly one of "the largest and most successful operations of its kind in the South, doing $750,000 worth of business annually by 1877."

Marsalis and Elizabeth “Lizzie” Josephine Crowdus, the daughter of a prominent Dallas physician and future mayor, married November 29, 1873. They had three children.

== Business relations ==
John S. Armstrong and Marsalis became partners in 1884. They had four grocery warehouses in Dallas, which reportedly grossed more than $20 million a year.

Marsalis was exceedingly civic-minded. He organized the first fire company in Dallas. He also was the first to pave a city street in Dallas in 1881. The material: bois d'arc blocks.

In 1887, Marsalis and Armstrong formed the Dallas Land and Loan Company, which purchased 2,000 acres (8.1 km^{2}) across the Trinity River from Dallas -- including Hord's Ridge and the Hord homestead -- to develop a new community. The area was named Oak Cliff. Development began in November 1887 when lots were auctioned by the company. An elevated railway was built, connecting Oak Cliff with the Dallas courthouse. The area was called a "beautiful suburb of Dallas."

With two successful successive auctions, Marsalis decided to take several lots off the market. He had hoped this would increase their price. Armstrong objected and immediately dissolved the partnership, taking the grocery concerns; Marsalis took the real estate holdings.

Marsalis continued developing Oak Cliff, including investing $500,000 of his own money for the land and various improvements, including streets, a waterworks, and electric plant. He built various amenities designed to position Oak Cliff as a resort destination. These included the Park Hotel, a huge four-story Victorian hotel, and mineral baths. There was a public bath project planned at Kidd Springs, and, in various promotional material, the area was compared to Cambridge, Massachusetts. He reportedly spent a total of million dollars promoting the new development.

Ruthmeade Place is another area Marsalis sought to develop. This was the second addition of the Dallas Land and Loan Company. Delayed by the 1893 depression, Ruthmeade Place was annexed to the city in 1889; however, development did not begin in earnest until 1905. The houses in the area were wood frame bungalows, predominantly Craftsman or Prairie style. There were a few Victorian homes in the development, one of which is now on the city preservation society's "Most Endangered" list.

Oak Cliff incorporated in 1890. The population was about 3,000 residents.

Marsalis, by this point in time, had invested almost $1 million in his city. He was a founder of and president of the Oak Cliff Hotel Company, Oak Cliff Light and Power Company, Oak Cliff Water Supply Company, and Dallas and Oak Cliff Railroad Company, in addition to continuing to oversee the Dallas Land and Loan Company. Development abruptly stopped thanks to the Panic of 1893 and Marsalis was financially ruined. He went bankrupt and sold all his interests in his various companies, including the Park Hotel. When the economy declined, he was forced to lease the structure to M. Thomas Edgerton, who planned to open a girls' school. This would become Oak Cliff College for Young Ladies.

Oak Cliff was ultimately annexed by the city of Dallas in 1903.

== Latter life and death ==
According to the Handbook of Texas Online, not much was known or had been published about the remainder of Marsalis's life; he moved to New York and reportedly died in poverty some years later. The precise location and date of his death remained unknown. Genealogists and historians have pieced together where Marsalis spent his last years. He died April 20, 1919, in Paterson, NJ and is buried in Cedar Lawn Cemetery

According to Legacies: A History Journal for Dallas and North Central Texas, the 1910 Census shows his residence as New York City while local papers announced his death in Paterson, New Jersey, in 1919.

The 150 acres (0.61 km^{2}) of park land he had set aside for Oak Cliff is now the location of Dallas’ Marsalis Park and Zoo. The zoo permanently relocated to the site in from Fair Park in 1912.

== Honors ==
A street running next to the Dallas Zoo connecting north and south Oak Cliff, Marsalis Avenue, as well as Thomas L. Marsalis Elementary School are named in his honor.
