= Hampton Hills, Dallas =

Neighborhood in Dallas, Texas, United States

Hampton Hills is a neighborhood in the Oak Cliff section of Dallas, Texas (USA), that was developed in the 1920s. The neighborhood is bounded by Clarendon Drive on the north, Wright Street on the south, Oak Cliff Boulevard on the east and Hampton Road on the west. Established in 1924, Hampton Hills is made up of about 300 wood-frame bungalows, brick and stone Tudor homes and post-war cottages that constitute one of the most undisturbed stands of original architecture in the city of Dallas.

== History ==
On Sept. 14, 1924, an advertisement appeared in The Dallas Morning News announcing the development of Hampton Hills. The new neighborhood would be accessible to the city of Dallas via the Oak Cliff streetcar line, and would have every "modern improvement," including "permanently paved streets, sewerage, water, gas, lights, etc." By November, an ad campaign was launched, aimed at the tradespeople and middle managers of local companies who were interested in moving into the area for its convenience and proximity to their employers. Billed as "Oak Cliff's Ideal Home Place," Hampton Hills boasted terraced lots, extra wide parkways and well-drained high ground. The neighborhood's developer, Alf W. Sanders, built his own home at 1322 Montreal Ave., and set up a sales office for his Hampton Hills Realty Company in a small Tudor-style building on Tilton (now Wilton) Street. The sales office still stands today.

A Dallas Morning News item on Nov. 16, 1924, announced a "completely developed subdivision" on the new Hampton Place streetcar line. Hampton Hills Realty Company ads emphasized the neighborhood's convenience, commanding view, and unmatched value. The ad blitz culminated with the "tag sale" ad on Thanksgiving Day, which drew attention to the neighborhood's proximity to streetcars and schools.

A.W. Sanders went on to build many of the neighborhood homes in the American Craftsman and Tudor Revival cottage styles, with small garages standing behind them. The cottages had wood-sided and brick and stone construction. Even today, examples of stained glass can be seen in many windows, as well as unique brick and stone work. Many interiors have archways, hardwood flooring, bathrooms and galley kitchens with small breakfast rooms and built-in cabinetry with beveled mirrors and stained glass. Some fireplace mantels display multiple types of wood and are flanked by built-in bookcases, which were gestures of the builders.

Homebuilding was curtailed during World War II (because of strict rationing of materials for the war effort), creating a housing shortage for returning soldiers and their families. To help address the crisis, Oak Cliff realtor and builder Wiley Roberts, who also served as executive board chairman of the Dallas Association of Home Builders, announced his intention to finish out the Hampton Hills neighborhood. In an Oct 5, 1945, Dallas Morning News item, Roberts said he would build 25 new brick homes in Hampton Hills, averaging around $8,000 each. On Aug. 11, 1946, The Dallas Morning News reported that Roberts’ son Bill, a Navy veteran, would join his father in completing 40 new homes in the neighborhood. During the previous decade, home styles had evolved to include minimal traditional, which incorporated Colonial and Tudor forms with a modern preference for as little ornamentation as possible. Consequently, Wiley Roberts and Sons built finely crafted cottages with shallow- to medium-pitched gabled or hipped roofs (usually with no eaves), small covered porches with simple pillars or columns, simple floor plans and occasionally corner-wrapped windows. These post-war homes are mostly asymmetrical with the front entrance off center, and with either attached or detached garages. And because they were the last homes to be built in Hampton Hills, they tend to occupy the corner lots.

In February 1951, the newly organized Hampton Hills Garden Club began meeting in the little chapel at Rosemont Christian Church. Meetings usually featured a speaker and a social. The club seems to have disbanded in late 1976.

In 1990, a group of residents formed the Hampton Hills Neighborhood Association to safeguard the neighborhood's architectural integrity and to enhance the quality of life for every resident. The group meets monthly at Rosemont Christian Church.

== Notable residents ==
Among Hampton Hills' most notable residents was Laster Baskem Bruton, who came to Dallas in the late 1920s to establish the Southwest Division of the Hygienics Products Company. In 1928, he and his wife, Sarah Estella Stratton Bruton, met with A.W. Sanders to finalize the deal on a newly constructed Tudor-style cottage at 1510 Hollywood Ave. On Oct. 6 of that year, the Brutons welcomed their first and only child, Mary Elizabeth.

L.B. Bruton went on to become a respected businessman. He was a Mason and a Methodist. His wife regularly hosted church socials at their home. But beneath the respectable façade, something wasn't right. Sometime around 1940, the Brutons' carefully crafted image began to unravel.

After the Brutons divorced, Laster Bruton married Aeron Burnet in Matamoros, Tamaulipas, in 1942—the same day Aeron Burnet divorced her husband, Owen Arther Burnet, whom she had married in 1936. Burnet had recently enlisted in the Navy and agreed that the two should divorce. Bruton had been calling his new bride for dates as early as 1938. The two divorced on Oct. 29, 1945, and she remarried Burnet a short time later.

On Feb. 22, 1946, Owen Burnet walked into Bruton's office on the seventh floor of the Texas Bank Building, asking Helen Pryor, Bruton's secretary, “Where’s Laster B.?” She told him Bruton would be back in a few minutes and asked him to wait. Pryor said that Bruton came into his office a short time later and sat down at his desk. When she walked to the door of Bruton's office to announce the visitor, Burnet stepped up behind her and began firing a .32-caliber automatic pistol at Bruton over Pryor's shoulder. Bruton died of multiple gunshot wounds to the head, neck and hips. When Burnet started shooting, Pryor ran out of the office and, along with a co-worker, entered a nearby room and locked the door.

Burnet surrendered himself at the sheriff's office an hour later.

The murder trial was a sensation. Among those who took the stand were Bruton's brother, Aeron Burnet and Owen Burnet. Burnet's legal team presented a “temporary insanity” defense. They said Bruton had a history of domestic violence, including one incident when he became enraged during an argument and shot at her with a .22-caliber pistol. Bruton missed, but she fainted and he kicked her, she said. A week prior to the killing, Bruton drove alongside the Burnets’ car on Eighth Street in Oak Cliff, opened the door and said, “I’ll get you yet,” then drove away. The following day, District Judge W.L. Thornton granted an order restraining Bruton from "molesting or harassing" his ex-wife. On the day of the killing, Bruton swerved his car in front of his ex-wife's, forcing it onto the curb between the Triple Underpass and Industrial Boulevard. Then he slapped her and cursed her, she said.

Owen Burnet, who was employed as a mechanic at the Singer Sewing Machine Company on Elm Street, took a call from his wife who “sounded hysterical.” After the conversation, Burnet left the building looking "pale and determined, but dazed," according to his co-workers. Bruton was gunned down a few minutes later in his office, which was six blocks away.

The Dallas Morning News reported that Burnet was found guilty of "murder without malice" and sentenced to five years in prison. The sentence, however, was overturned on appeal. The appeals court said the trial judge should have admitted testimony about Burnet's acts and appearance shortly before he left his office to kill Bruton.

Another notable resident was Virgil Oliver Stamps, a gospel singer and promoter who helped make gospel music popular and widely available throughout East Texas and the southern U.S. He is perhaps best known for obtaining the copywrite to the music of When the Saints Go Marching In.

After attending several music schools, he worked James D. Vaughan and ran the Vaughan Publishing Company office in Jacksonville, Texas, from 1915 into the 1920s. In 1924, Stamps opened the V.O. Stamps School of Music in Jacksonville. His friend J.R. Baxter became his business partner and they changed the name of the company to the Stamps-Baxter Music Company in 1927. The company quickly became the nation's premier gospel music business. Its activities included songwriting, publishing and sponsoring musical groups and radio broadcasts. Baxter oversaw the operations east of the Mississippi River, while Stamps ran the operations in the western U.S. from his Dallas headquarters. This early success enabled Stamps and his wife, Addie, to purchase a new home at 1611 Hollywood Ave., where they lived with their teenage son, Ware.

Stamps-Baxter helped bring gospel music into the mainstream by broadcasting it nationally on radio and by encouraging performance in public. Stamps and his quartet started a noonday radio program on KRLD radio in Dallas in 1936. The program brought him, the company and gospel music increasingly into public view. The radio program was so successful that it enabled Stamps-Baxter to become the most successful publisher of shape-note music in America. The company's annual Stamps-Baxter School of Music stood as the largest developer of gospel singers in Texas and throughout the south well into the 1950s.

Stamps died of heart disease on Aug. 19, 1940. His funeral was attended by thousands. In 1973, he was inducted into the Gospel Music Association Hall of Fame. The Southern Gospel Music Hall of Fame inducted Stamps in 1997. He has also been honored in the Texas Gospel Music Hall of Fame as a pioneer of gospel music.

== Accessibility ==
Several major freeways are immediately accessible from Hampton Hills, offering easy local and regional commuter travel. Interstate 30 outlines is to the north; I-20 sits to the south, Loop 12/Spur 408 is to the west, and I-45 is to the east. Interstate 35 and U.S. Highway 67 bisect Oak Cliff, serving the area's north–south traffic.

The City-operated Dallas Executive Airport is located a few miles from Hampton Hills, and both Dallas’ Love Field and the busy Dallas-Fort Worth International Airport are located just 30 minutes from the neighborhood.

Dallas Area Rapid Transit has an extensive network of light rail lines, regional railways and bus services—all of which are accessible from the Hampton Station, adjacent to Hampton Hills at the corner of Hampton Road and Wright Street.
