= Stevens Vehicles =

- Company type: Private company
- Industry: Automotive
- Headquarters: Port Talbot, United Kingdom
- Area served: Worldwide
- Products: Electric vehicles
- Website: www.stevensvehicles.co.uk

Stevens Vehicles Ltd is a British electric car and van manufacturer based in Port Talbot. The company is a manufacturer of zero emission electric cars and vans designed by the father and son team of Tony Stevens and Peter Stevens. The vehicles were conceived, designed and developed in Kent, England and are manufactured at Port Talbot, Wales.

== Background ==
The brand, comprising two vehicle types, was launched on 1 March 2008, comprising the ZeCar and ZeVan. The designer is Professor Tony Stevens, who has spent over 50 years in the motor industry and who has long experience in the engineering, design and marketing of vehicles. Tony Stevens designed the Hillman Hunter and Sunbeam Rapier. Peter Stevens is an international banker, involved in the financial and sales side of the business.

The design of the vehicles has been described as being "deliciously weird....a bit dippy, yet great fun and strangely stylish." The strong visual statement derives from their distinctive height, which results from the higher than normal driving position. This is based on the belief, of Tony Stevens, that the driver should be positioned as if sitting at a table. This position gives the driver good access and visibility, but the design also provides plenty of headroom. Both types of vehicle are designed to maximise internal space relative to external dimensions so that, although they are shorter and narrower than most compact vehicles they are also taller, thus creating the equivalent space of a much larger vehicle.

The Ze in Zecar and ZeVan stands for zero environmental emissions. On-road carbon dioxide emissions are zero. However, the lead-acid batteries require recharging which may produce carbon dioxide, depending on the energy supply source. Stevens Vehicles is being supported by the Welsh Assembly Government's Accelerate Clusters programme which plans to strengthen the automobile sector in Wales by developing emerging technologies and identifying and exploiting niche markets. The factory is based at the ECM2 business site within the Port Talbot Steelworks.

The Stevens Vehicles website currently indicates that they are no longer producing vehicles having failed to secure further adequate finance.

== ZeCar ==
ZeCar

Overview
- Manufacturer: Stevens Vehicles Ltd.
- Production: current
- Designer: Professor Tony Stevens

Body and chassis
- Body style: 5-door hatchback

Powertrain
- Engine: twin AC induction brushless and maintenance free electric

Dimensions
- Length: 3.00m
- Width: 1.50m
- Height: 1.75m

The ZeCar is a five-door hatchback with a twin AC induction brushless and maintenance free electric engine, giving the car 140 lb ft of torque. There is a maintenance-free toothed belt drive to the rear wheels. Battery charging comprises an on-board automatic charging system, with maintenance-free sealed lead-acid gel batteries.

The maximum speed of the ZeCar is 56 mph, and with standard batteries the maximum range is 56 miles, unless back-up batteries are used. Acceleration is 0–40 mph in 15 seconds. The running cost is calculated at 1.2p per mile and the car is not subject to road tax, or congestion charges and parking is free or discounted in some cities such as London.

In 2008, this was the only five-seat electric car on sale in Britain.

== ZeVan ==
ZeVan

Overview
- Manufacturer: Stevens Vehicles Ltd.
- Production: current
- Designer: Professor Tony Stevens

Body and chassis
- Body style: 2-door van

Powertrain
- Engine: twin AC induction brushless and maintenance free electric
- Range: up to 100 miles

Dimensions
- Length: 3.00m
- Width: 1.50m
- Height: 1.75m

The ZeVan is based on the same design as the ZeCar. Access to the rear is by twin-split doors which open out fully and the near-cube design allows optimum space utilisation. The load volume is one Cheps pallet or a Euro pallet and the payload is 450 kg. The dimensions of the load area are 1.80 cubic metres. The estimated battery life is 700 cycles at 80% depth of discharge and the design life is 12 years. The cost per mile is estimated at between 1p and 1.2p depending on the electricity tariff rate.

As the van is electric it does not need servicing and at the end of the battery life Stevens Vehicles would plan to collect the old battery, replace it with a new one, and recycle the old battery. The van is constructed on the principle that it can be recharged on a three-pin plug, thus avoiding the need for supporting infrastructure, although rapid chargers can be purchased allowing a recharge time of 30 minutes. The range is 55 miles for the van and driver, reducing to 38 miles for a fully laden van. Additional batteries can be fitted to increase the range by 50%, but with a corresponding reduction in payload of 125 kg.

== Plans ==
The project plan is to develop several variations on the "Ze" theme. Plans include variants on the Ze range, including a pick-up truck and taxi, together with a contemporary version of the Cipher, a concept car first shown at the 1980 motor show and which could go on sale with an electric engine with a range capability of 70 miles and a 70 mph top speed. New battery technologies are under development, including non-hydrogen fuel cells and bio-diesel hybrids.

The global plan is to establish small Ze plants in rural areas across the developing world. The production line and other tools and materials would be delivered by a single lorry and full-scale production could begin rapidly with output flexible enough to meet the cycle of local supply. Tony Stevens refers to this concept as Global Village Transport.

== See also ==
- Asquith Motors
