= Stevens, South Dakota =

Coordinates: 42°31′44″N 96°29′48″W

Stevens is an extinct town in Union County, in the U.S. state of South Dakota.

== History ==
Stevens was laid out in 1922 by W. W. Stevens, and named for him. A post office called Stevens was established in 1923, and remained in operation until 1952, when it was renamed "North Sioux City".
