= Cliff Lake (Maine) =

Lake in Piscataquis County, Maine, United States

- Location within Maine Location within the United States
- Location: Northwest Piscataquis, North Maine Woods region, Piscataquis County, Maine
- Coordinates: 46°24′0″N 69°15′5″W
- Catchment area: Allagash River watershed
- Basin countries: United States
- Surface elevation: 964 feet (294 m)

Cliff Lake is located in the Northwest Piscataquis unorganized territory and North Maine Woods region, within Piscataquis County in northern Maine.

The lake drains via Twin Lake and South Twin Brook into Churchill Lake, the source of the Allagash River.

It is home to many species of cold water fish.

== Notes ==
- "Cliff Lake". Geographic Names Information System. United States Geological Survey, United States Department of the Interior.
