= Kessler Park Historic District =

Historic district in Texas, United States

- U.S. National Register of Historic Places
- U.S. Historic district
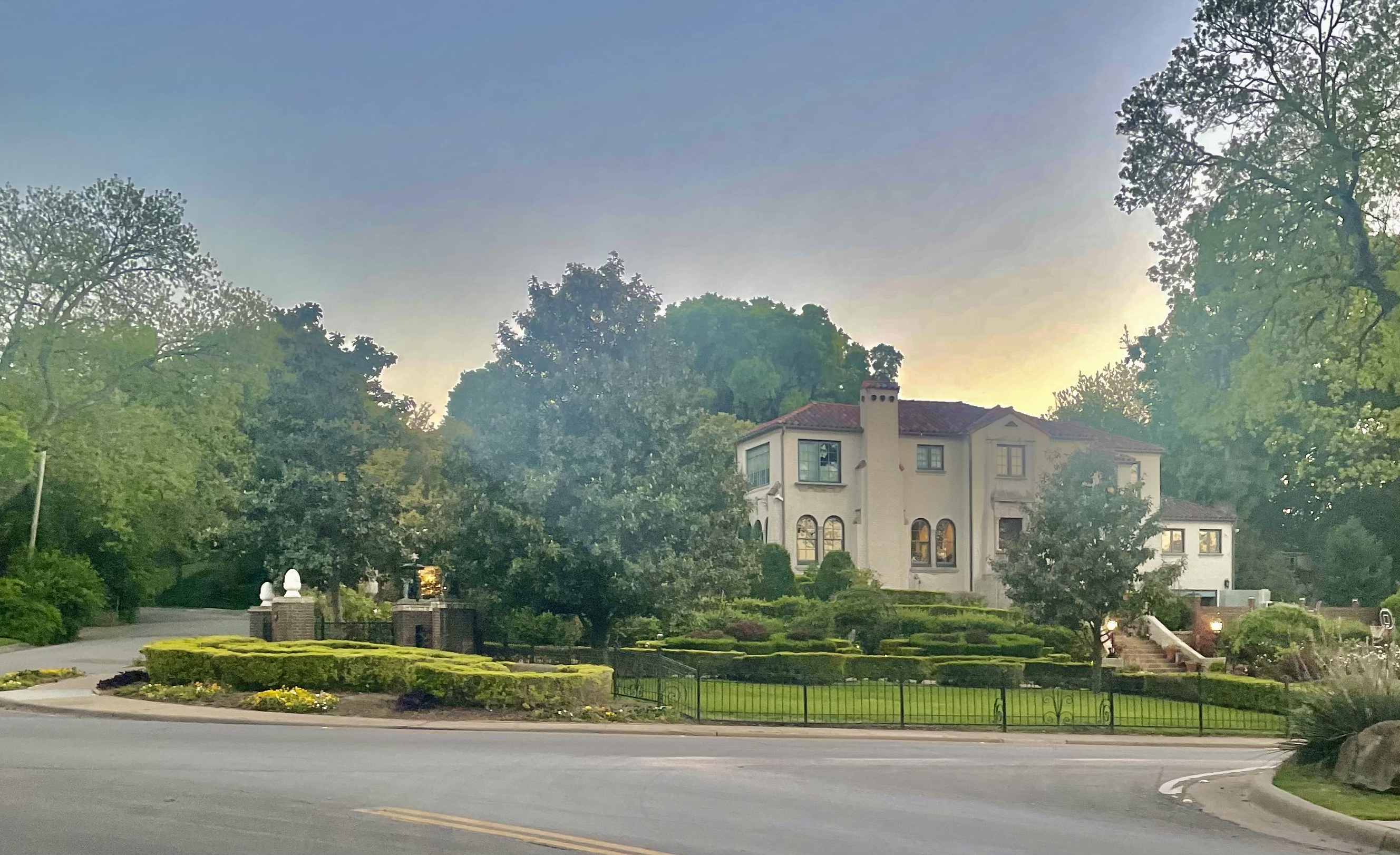
- Kessler Park in 2023

- Location within Texas Location within the United States
- Location: Kessler Park, Dallas, Texas
- Coordinates: 32°45′25″N 96°50′39″W
- Area: 285 acres (115 ha)
- Architectural style: Tudor Revival, Mission/Spanish Revival, Bungalow/Craftsman
- MPS: Oak Cliff MPS
- NRHP reference No.: 94000607 (original); 95001087 (increase)

Significant dates
- Added to NRHP: June 17, 1994
- Boundary increase: September 7, 1995

Kessler Park Historic District is located in the Kessler Park neighborhood of Dallas, Texas (USA). It was added to the National Register on June 17, 1994.

== See also ==
- National Register of Historic Places listings in Dallas County, Texas
