= Polk Terrace =

Neighborhood in Dallas, TX

Polk Terrace is a neighborhood located in the Oak Cliff section of Dallas, Texas. It is bordered by Camp Wisdom Rd on the north, Polk St on the west, I35E on the east, and Wheatland Rd on the south.
