= Stevens Park Village, Dallas =

Coordinates: 32.762603°N 96.860265°W

Stevens Park Village
- Interactive map of Stevens Park Village
- Country: United States
- State: Texas
- Counties: Dallas
- City: Dallas
- Area: Oak Cliff
- Elevation: 489 ft (149 m)
- ZIP code: 75211
- Area codes: 214, 469, 972

Stevens Park Village is a neighborhood in northern Oak Cliff, Dallas, Texas (USA), named for its developer, John P. Stevens.

== Geography ==
The neighborhood is bounded by Remond Dr to the north, N Hampton Rd to the east, Fullerton Dr to the west and Fort Worth Ave to the south. The neighborhood includes the following streets:

- Barberry Dr
- W Colorado Blvd
- Fullerton Dr
- Lawndale Dr
- Leander Dr
- Stevens Crest Dr
- Stevens Ridge Dr
- Walter Dr

== History ==
Most of the homes on Colorado, Lawndale, Barberry, Leander, and Walter were built in 1939 to 1941, while the homes on Stevens Ridge, Stevens Crest, and Fullerton were built in the 1950s and 1960s. While the exteriors retain their historical integrity, the interiors vary from completely updated to completely vintage.

The noted Dallas architect Charles Dilbeck, whose work helps give the Park Cities and Preston Hollow neighborhoods of Dallas their distinctive look, designed 15 homes in Stevens Park Village. Dilbeck believed that a house should be a place to welcome friends and visitors alike. Many of his homes are L-shaped with heavy porch timbers that create an inviting, yet solid feeling. Some of the homes are of brick construction, also typical of the time.

== Schools ==
Stevens Park Village is in the Dallas Independent School District.

- Stevens Park Elementary School
- Raul Quintanilla Sr. Middle School STEAM Academy
- Dr. L. G. Pinkston Sr. High School
