= Mount Powell (Utah) =

Mountain in Utah, United States

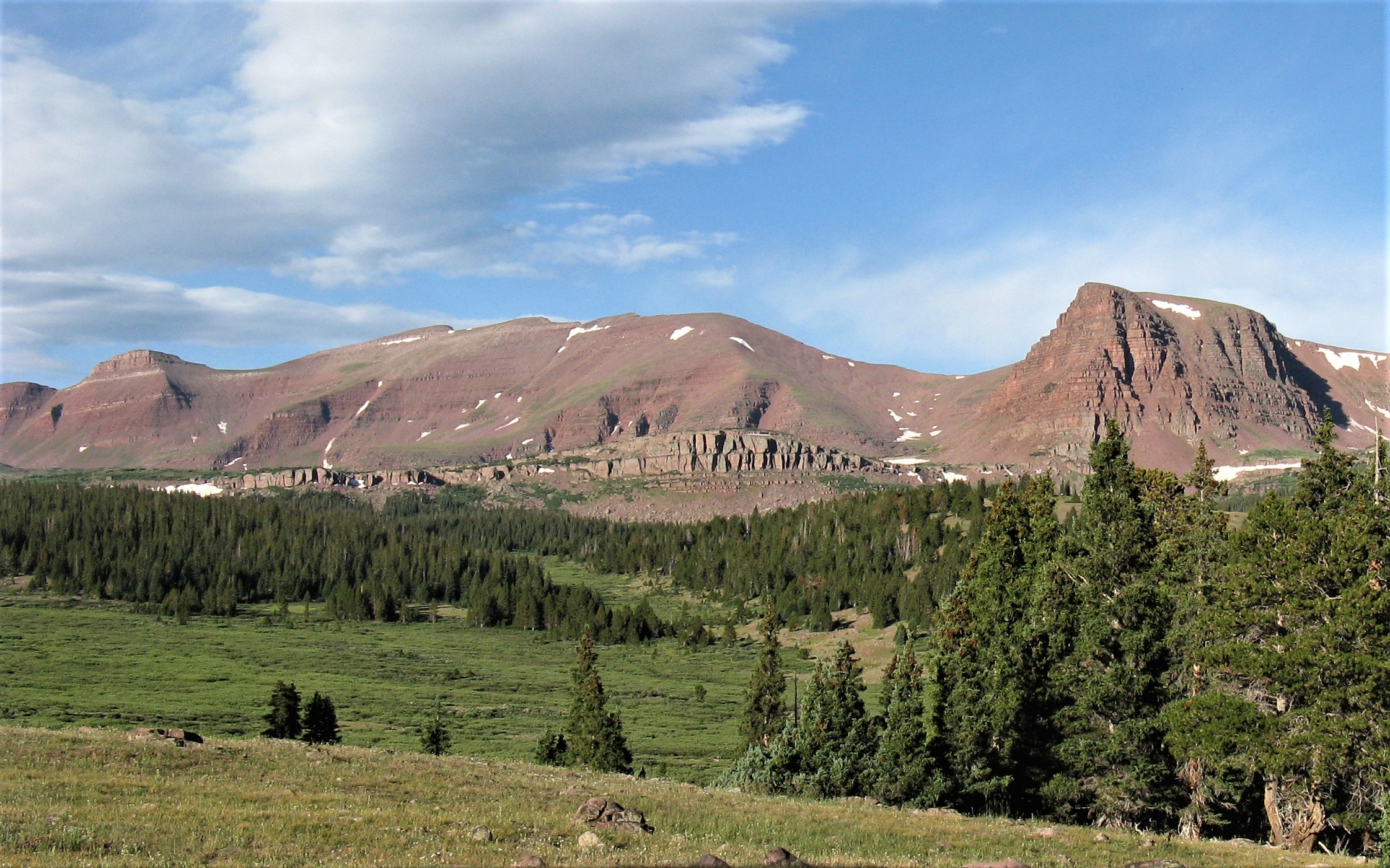
- Northeast aspect

Highest point
- Elevation: 13,165 ft (4,013 m) NAVD 88
- Prominence: 799 ft (244 m)
- Parent peak: Kings Peak
- Coordinates: 40°47′45″N 110°25′30″W

Geography
- Location within Utah
- Location: Summit County, Utah, U.S.
- Parent range: Uinta Mountains
- Topo map: USGS Mount Powell

Mount Powell is a mountain in the Uinta Mountains in Northeastern Utah and is the thirteenth highest summit in the state. The peak is named after USGS Director John Wesley Powell. The summit is in the High Uintas Wilderness and the Ashley National Forest.

== Climate ==
Climate data for Mount Powell 40.7927 N, 110.4258 W, Elevation: 12,756 ft (3,888 m) (1991–2020 normals)
Month	Jan	Feb	Mar	Apr	May	Jun	Jul	Aug	Sep	Oct	Nov	Dec	Year
Mean daily maximum °F (°C)	22.1 (−5.5)	22.4 (−5.3)	28.2 (−2.1)	32.2 (0.1)	40.5 (4.7)	51.4 (10.8)	59.1 (15.1)	57.5 (14.2)	50.0 (10.0)	38.9 (3.8)	28.1 (−2.2)	21.8 (−5.7)	37.7 (3.2)
Daily mean °F (°C)	11.6 (−11.3)	10.8 (−11.8)	15.7 (−9.1)	19.7 (−6.8)	28.2 (−2.1)	38.6 (3.7)	46.1 (7.8)	44.7 (7.1)	37.4 (3.0)	27.3 (−2.6)	17.8 (−7.9)	11.5 (−11.4)	25.8 (−3.4)
Mean daily minimum °F (°C)	1.1 (−17.2)	−0.9 (−18.3)	3.1 (−16.1)	7.2 (−13.8)	15.9 (−8.9)	25.7 (−3.5)	33.1 (0.6)	32.0 (0.0)	24.8 (−4.0)	15.6 (−9.1)	7.4 (−13.7)	1.3 (−17.1)	13.9 (−10.1)
Average precipitation inches (mm)	2.65 (67)	2.64 (67)	3.08 (78)	4.03 (102)	4.16 (106)	2.33 (59)	2.88 (73)	2.84 (72)	2.72 (69)	3.02 (77)	2.52 (64)	2.37 (60)	35.24 (894)
Source: PRISM Climate Group
