= George Dealey =

American journalist

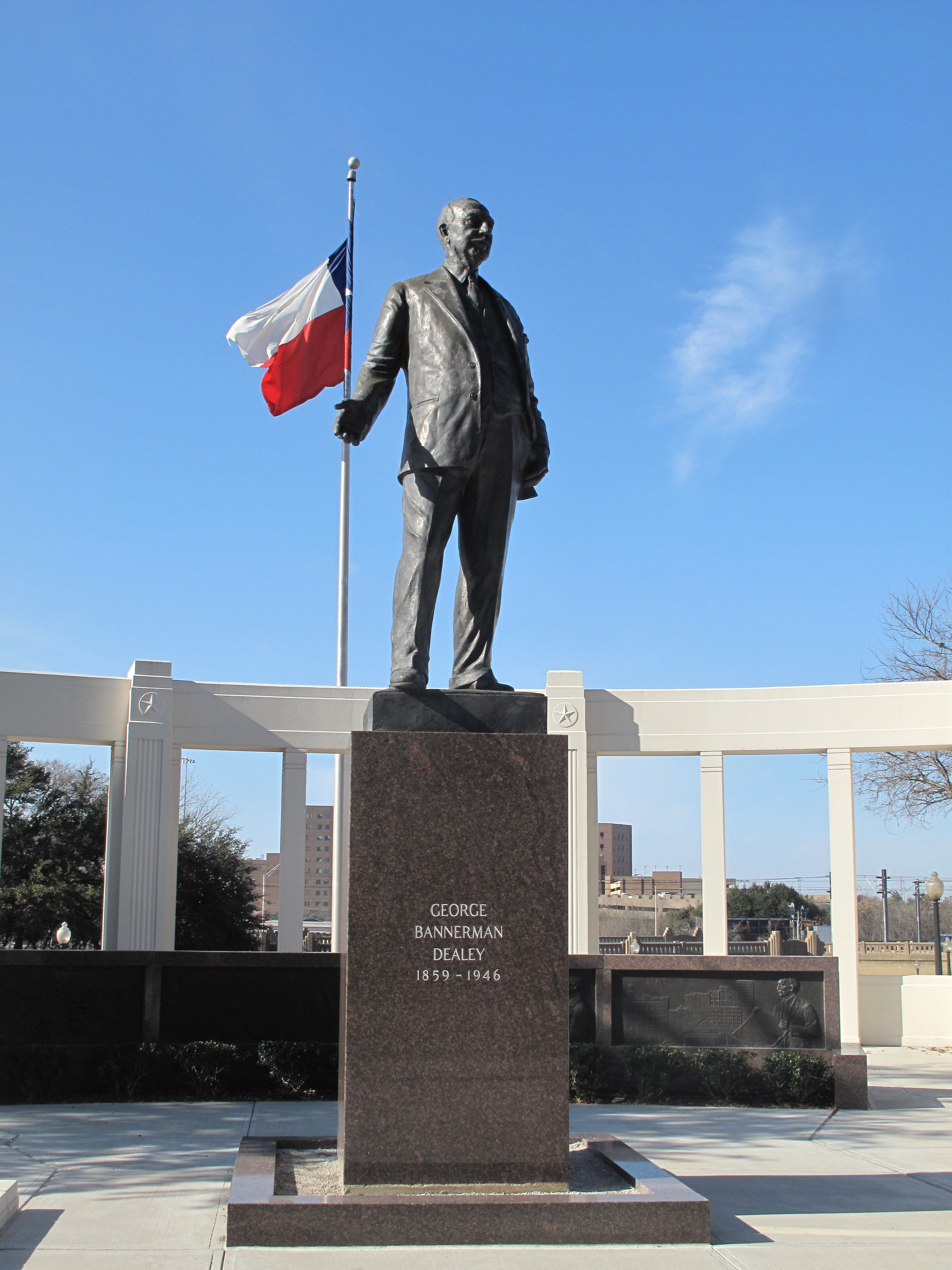
George Dealey at West End Historic District

George Bannerman Dealey (September 18, 1859 – February 26, 1946) was a Dallas, Texas, businessman. Dealey was the long-time publisher of The Dallas Morning News and owner of the A. H. Belo Corporation. A plaza in Dallas is named in his honor and became instantly world-famous when it was the site of the assassination of John F. Kennedy in 1963.

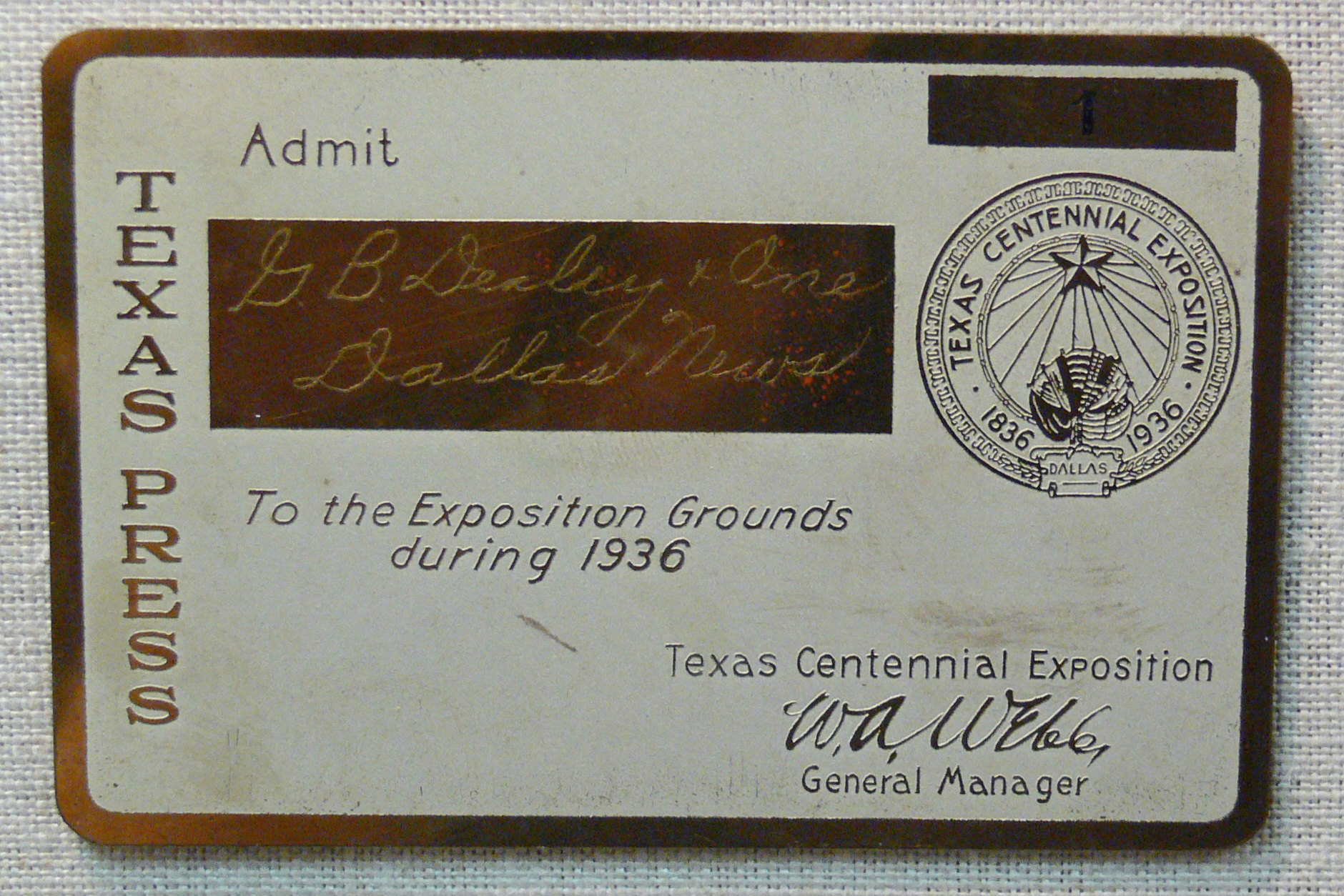
George Dealey's press pass for the Texas Centennial Exposition in 1936

== Childhood ==
Dealey was born on September 18, 1859, at the home of his parents, George Dealey (1829–1894) and Mary Ann Nellins (1829–1913), on Queen St., Rusholme, Manchester, England. He was the fifth of 10 children.

In the mid-1860s the family moved to Liverpool, England, where he began his schooling and worked as a grocer's apprentice. In 1870 his family immigrated to Galveston, Texas, where he continued in public school and worked at various odd jobs.

== Newspaper career ==
On October 12, 1874, Dealey assumed an older brother's job as an office boy at The Galveston News at $3.00 per week, for the owner, Alfred H. Belo. Dealey took evening classes at the Island City Business College and rose steadily at the News. As a traveling correspondent, he sent both news stories and newspaper-business reports back to Galveston.

In 1884, Dealey determined that Dallas would be the best market for a new Belo company newspaper. In 1885, The Dallas Morning News debuted. He became the paper's manager in 1895, a board member in 1902, vice president and general manager of the corporation in 1906, and president in 1919.

Dealey refused advertising that he considered dishonest or immoral, including ads for hard liquor. He refused ads for oilfield ventures since he could not determine which were sound businesses. The News also opposed the Ku Klux Klan's influence in the 1920s.

Dealey also owned the G. B. Dealey Land Co. and the West Commerce Realty Co. He founded an early newspaper-owned radio station, WFAA, in 1922.

In 1926, Dealey bought The Dallas Morning News, the Journal (an evening edition), the Semi-Weekly Farm News, and the Texas Almanac from the heirs of A. H. Belo, along with a majority of the company stock.

== Civic activities ==
Under Dealey, the News was enlisted in the cause of civic planning. A campaign of 1899 led to the foundation of the Cleaner Dallas League, which became the Dallas Civic Improvement League in 1902. He was instrumental in the adoption of the 1910 Kessler Plan to improve Dallas and provide for its growth.

Dealey helped establish Southern Methodist University and was instrumental in bringing a Federal Reserve branch to Dallas.

Dealey served on the board of governors of the American City Planning Institute (1920–21), as vice president of the National Municipal League (1923–24), on the advisory council of the American Planning and Civic Association, and on the national committee of the Commission on Interracial Cooperation. He was a director of the Children's Hospital of Texas and was president of the Family Bureau, a Dallas social agency, from its inception in 1908. He was also president of the Philosophical Society of Texas, a member of the Texas Press Association, an honorary life member of the Texas State Historical Association, founder (1922) and lifetime president (from 1933) of the Dallas Historical Society, and second vice president of the Associated Press (1923–24).

Dealey had honorary roles with Sigma Delta Chi (1940–41) and Phi Beta Kappa (1943). He received honorary doctoral degrees from Southern Methodist University (1921), Austin College (1924), and the University of Missouri (1925), the last of which invited him to accept a gift to its school of journalism from the British Empire Press Union.

Dealey Plaza in Downtown Dallas was named for him upon commencement of its construction in 1934 (for the 1936 Texas Centennial). He initially thought to decline the honor, but was persuaded to accept it by his son. A statue of G.B. Dealey was made and erected in Dealey Plaza in 1949.

== Personal life ==
Dealey married Olivia Allen at her home in Lexington, Missouri, on April 9, 1884. She was born in Lexington on November 14, 1863, and died at her home in Dallas on January 28, 1960. Allen had succeeded her husband as chairman of the board of A. H. Belo Corporation and was serving in that capacity when she died.

The Dealeys had three daughters and two sons. The sons were Walter Allen Dealey and Edward Musgrove (Ted) Dealey. Ted Dealey succeeded his father as publisher of the Morning News and became known for his strident conservatism and anti-communism. A younger brother, James Q. Dealey (1861–1937), was a professor of political science at Brown University and later editor of the Morning News. A nephew, Samuel David Dealey (1906–1944), was a World War II naval submarine officer who received the Medal of Honor and for whom the USS Dealey (DE-1006) was named. Another grandson, Dr. Walter Allen (Al) Dealey Jr. became a Christian minister and studied under Norman Vincent Peale.

Robert Decherd, CEO of A. H. Belo Corporation from 1987 to 2013, and James M. Moroney III, Belo CEO from 2013 to 2018, are each Dealey's great-grandson.

Dealey was a thirty-third-degree Scottish Rite Mason, Knight Templar, Shriner, and member of the Red Cross of Constantine. He was a Presbyterian and Democrat. The New York Times called him the "dean of American newspaper publishers" for his 71 consecutive years of service to a single newspaper.

Dealey was still working as a publisher when he died of a massive coronary occlusion at his Dallas home, February 26, 1946, at the age of 86. He was buried in Grove Hill Cemetery in Dallas.

== Legacy ==
- The Dallas Independent School District (DISD) operates George Bannerman Dealey Montessori School, an elementary school named for him in the Preston Royal area of North Dallas.
- In 2021, the Belo Center for New Media on the UT Austin campus was renamed the G. B. Dealey Center for New Media to honor his legacy as "a legend in journalism and media."
- A statue of Dealey was erected in Dealey Plaza in 1949, three years after his death.
