= The Pinnacle (Bristol, Tennessee) =

- Location: Pinnacle Parkway, Bristol, Tennessee
- Coordinates: 36.59283°N 82.25817°W
- Opened: 2014–2015
- Developer: Johnson Commercial Development, Oldacre McDonald
- Num. of stores: 69+
- Num. of anchor tenants: 4, plus 6 junior anchors
- Floor area: 1.3 million sq. ft
- Website: thepinnacle.com

The Pinnacle is a 240-acre (97 ha) shopping center and commercial development located in Bristol, Tennessee. Established by Johnson Commercial Development and Oldacre McDonald LLC, its first stores opened in 2014. It is a mixed-use complex, with 1.3 million square feet (appx. 121,000 square meters) of retail, restaurant, hotel, and office space, as well as recreational areas. The Pinnacle is located off of U.S. Route 11W and Interstate 81. It is adjacent to the Virginia state line and is near the twin city of Bristol, Virginia.

Anchor stores are Bass Pro Shops, Belk, Dick's Sporting Goods, CarMax and Marquee Cinemas. Its junior anchors are Old Navy, Michaels, Ulta Beauty, Kirkland's, and Marshalls.

== History ==
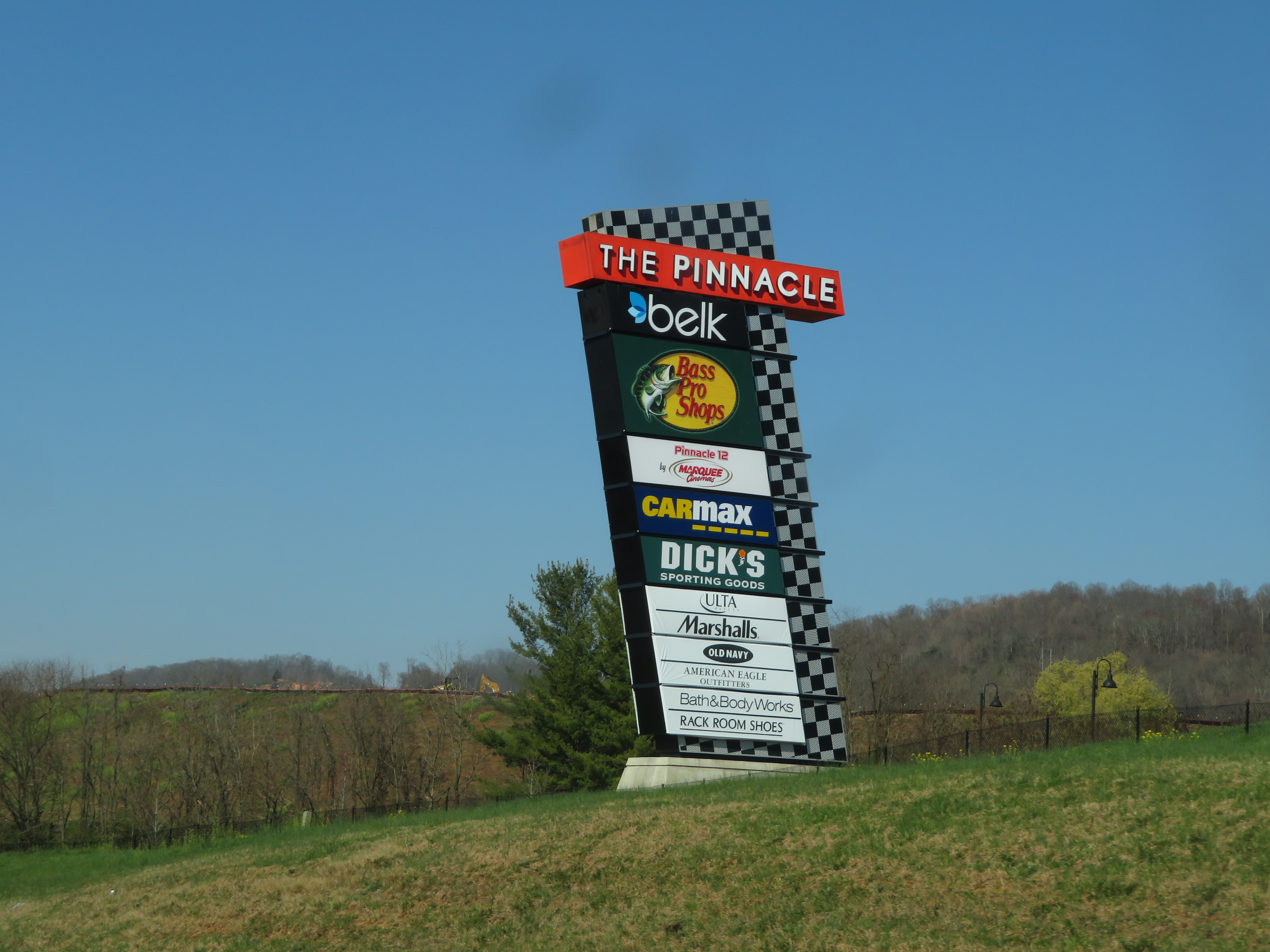
Sign for The Pinnacle off of Interstate 81

The $200,000,000 development was partially funded by the City of Bristol, which provided $25,000,000 for the Public Infrastructure portion of the project. Johnson estimates that the first phase of the complex will create 2000 jobs, and add $200 million in annual sales to the local economy. The first stores opened in 2014 and many have followed in 2015. Pinnacle 12 by Marquee Cinemas opened in October 2015.

== Recreation ==
Pinnacle Park is located near Bass Pro Shops. It is a 14-acre (5.7 ha) park with a lake and lakeside trail.
