= Trinity Park (Baseball Park) =

Sporting venue in Dallas, Texas, US

Trinity Park was a minor league baseball park located in Dallas, Texas, and was one of the Texas League champion Dallas Hams home ballparks from 1897 to 1904. The ballpark existed in the bottom of the Trinity River; the Houston Street viaduct presently goes over where right field existed.

The Oak Cliff Railroad ran special trains with a 5¢ charge to enable fans to get to the ground.
