= Kessler Plan =

The Kessler Plan was a comprehensive city plan for Dallas, Texas, prepared by the landscape architect and city planner George E. Kessler and published in 1912. Commissioned by the Dallas Chamber of Commerce in 1909, it proposed confining the flood-prone Trinity River between levees, eliminating hazardous railroad crossings, and reworking the cramped downtown street system, and replacing the city's five scattered passenger depots into Dallas Union Station. Little of it was built at first. A revised plan followed in 1919, and from 1924 the Kessler Plan Association campaigned for its implementation; the Trinity levees were completed in the 1930s.

== History ==
Kessler had grown up in Dallas: his widowed mother brought him there from Germany in 1865, and as a youth he worked at the Sanger dry goods store before leaving to study civic design in Europe. By the time the city engaged him he had laid out Kansas City's park and boulevard system and the grounds of the 1904 St. Louis World's Fair, and that same year had reworked the grounds of Dallas's own Fair Park. He went on to produce plans for Cincinnati, Indianapolis, Cleveland, El Paso, Denver, Syracuse, and Longview, Washington.

In 1909, the Dallas Chamber of Commerce established the City Plan and Improvement League and hired Kessler to draft a design for a long-range plan of civic improvements. Kessler drew up his plan to solve many of the city's problems, including the uncontrollable flooding of the Trinity River, the dangerous railroad crossings, and narrow, crooked downtown streets, and the construction of a Central Boulevard. The plan was published in 1912. Kessler returned in 1918 to act as consulting engineer for the Dallas Property Owners' Association and in 1919 began working for the Metropolitan Development Association of the Dallas Chamber of Commerce. A revised version of the plan was completed in 1919. He remained in Dallas until January 3, 1922, when he returned to St. Louis. Kessler died in Indianapolis, Indiana, on March 20, 1923.

== Proposals ==
Kessler called it a plan for rebuilding an existing city rather than building a new one, and insisted it was a plan for the whole city, not any one district. His diagnosis was that Dallas had grown from a village at a temporary railroad terminus with no thought for the population to come. He read the city's topography as a natural zoning — railroads and industry on the bottoms once they were protected from floods, business on the next terrace, residences on the heights — and the plan was built on that reading.

The first recommendation was flood control. The Trinity's channel would be moved toward Oak Cliff and confined between levees 25 feet high and 1,200 feet apart, the excavated earth filling the adjoining bottoms. Kessler expected the reclaimed land to pull West Dallas and Oak Cliff into the city proper, and he declined to propose any beautification of the river until the flooding was solved.

Second was a belt railroad looping around Dallas and around Oak Cliff and West Dallas, carrying through freight outside the city and allowing tracks to come out of the streets. That in turn would make possible a single union station near Main and Broadway, with a plaza in front, and the removal of the two worst grade-crossing barriers downtown: the Texas and Pacific tracks on Pacific Avenue and the Houston and Texas Central tracks on Central Avenue, whose right-of-way would become a 200-foot boulevard. Some eighteen downtown streets were to be opened or widened.

The rest of the plan was a park and boulevard system in two rings — an inner one connecting the existing parks by parkways along Turtle Creek and Mill Creek, and an outer one around the city — plus the conversion of the White Rock reservoir into a park, city control over subdivision platting, and the use of school grounds as playgrounds. Kessler proposed bonds for buying land, special assessments on benefited property for improving it, and the power of eminent domain, without which, he wrote, little of real importance would be done.

Kessler returned in 1919–20 to revise the plan for the Dallas Property Owners' Association and the Metropolitan Development Association. The supplement enlarged the levees to 30 feet high and 2,000 feet apart, greatly expanded the street program, and renewed the Central Avenue proposal; its details were never printed.

== Kessler Plan Association ==
Disputes within the Dallas Property Owners Association over which parts of the plan to pursue first led its members to form a new body devoted to carrying out Kessler's proposals. The Kessler Plan Association was incorporated on May 13, 1924, by C. L. Sanger, John E. Surratt, Porter Lindsey, and W. C. Barnes, and with the backing of George Bannerman Dealey, Karl Hoblitzelle, and Edward H. Cary it became the leading planning organization in Dallas during the 1920s. The association deliberately drew its membership from across the city, with a vice president for each council district and a large executive committee that included the heads of affiliated neighborhood groups; by 1928 some 115 civic organizations had joined, and both Black and working-class white residents were invited to its meetings.

Much of the association's work was public education about planning in general and the Kessler Plan in particular, through pamphlets, a newsletter, talks to clubs, and coverage in the Dallas Morning News. In 1927 it published a seventh-grade civics textbook by Justin Ford Kimball, Our City—Dallas: A Community Civics, modeled on a textbook used to promote the 1909 Plan of Chicago. It also made its maps, reports, and expertise available to individual neighborhoods free of charge.

The association was instrumental in winning voter approval of the Ulrickson Program, a $23.9 million bond package intended to complete the Kessler Plan, including the leveeing of the Trinity River, alongside other city needs. A dispute over whether the program's sewer funds should serve neighborhoods citywide or be diverted to the Trinity River levee project then split the association's leadership, with Surratt, Cary, and Hoblitzelle siding with the neighborhoods against Dealey and other downtown interests. Business support fell away, Dealey broke with the association by 1931, and it cut all paid staff except Surratt. It survived in reduced form, working with smaller towns in the Dallas trade area, until Surratt's death in 1957.

== Implementation ==
By 1925 several of the plan's elements had been carried out. Union Station opened in 1916 on the site Kessler had suggested, though he had no part in its design, with Ferris Plaza laid out in front of it; the Texas and Pacific tracks were removed from Pacific Avenue in 1921, a project Louis Head called the most important civic work in Dallas since the plan was made; the Katy tracks were raised over Maple, Fairmount, Lemmon, and Cedar Springs between 1918 and 1921; the belt line was about a quarter built; and Turtle Creek Parkway, on which the development of Highland Park depended, was largely complete. Lamar, St. Paul, and Harwood streets had been or were being widened under a 1923 state law allowing the cost to be assessed on benefited property. The levees, the Central Avenue boulevard, Mill Creek Parkway, South Boulevard, and most of the outer boulevard system and the Oak Cliff proposals remained unbuilt; the railroad had asked $2 million to give up the Central Avenue right-of-way.

The levees that relocated and confined the Trinity were completed in the 1930s.

The Central Expressway was first opened to traffic in 1950, decades after the Kessler Plan called for its construction.
