= Kessler, Dallas =

Area of Dallas, Texas, United States

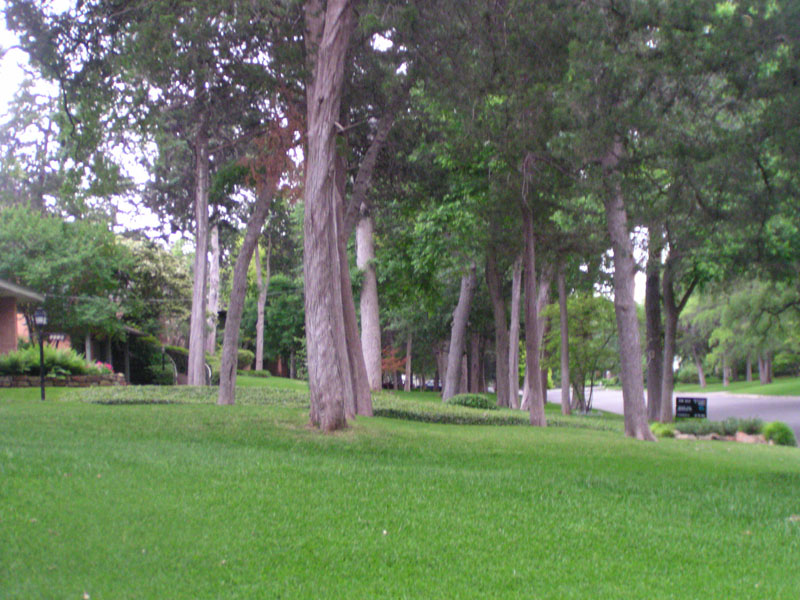
Kessler Heights neighborhood

The Kessler community is a group of neighborhoods named for George E. Kessler in the Oak Cliff area of Dallas, Texas, United States. Neighborhoods in the area include Kessler Park, Kessler Highlands, Kessler Park Estates, Kessler Square, East Kessler Park, West Kessler, and Kessler Plaza.

Kessler Park is the principal area and is bounded by Highway 30 to the north, Colorado to the south, Beckley to the east, and the Stevens Park Golf Course to the west. It is a wealthy neighborhood known for its mature trees and rolling hill terrain, located just southwest of downtown Dallas. It is also home to the Kessler Park Historic District.

The area takes its name from the Kessler Plan, the 1910 city plan Kessler prepared for Dallas, which proposed a boulevard running north from the Oak Cliff viaduct around the western highlands and along the bluffs of Coombs Creek, with a parkway on either side of the creek. By 1925 property for the route had been dedicated for almost its whole length and a 100-foot roadway donated along Colorado Boulevard from Zang Boulevard west to Stevens Park, forming the southern edge of what became Kessler Park.
