= Tyler metropolitan area =

Tyler
- Metropolitan statistical area
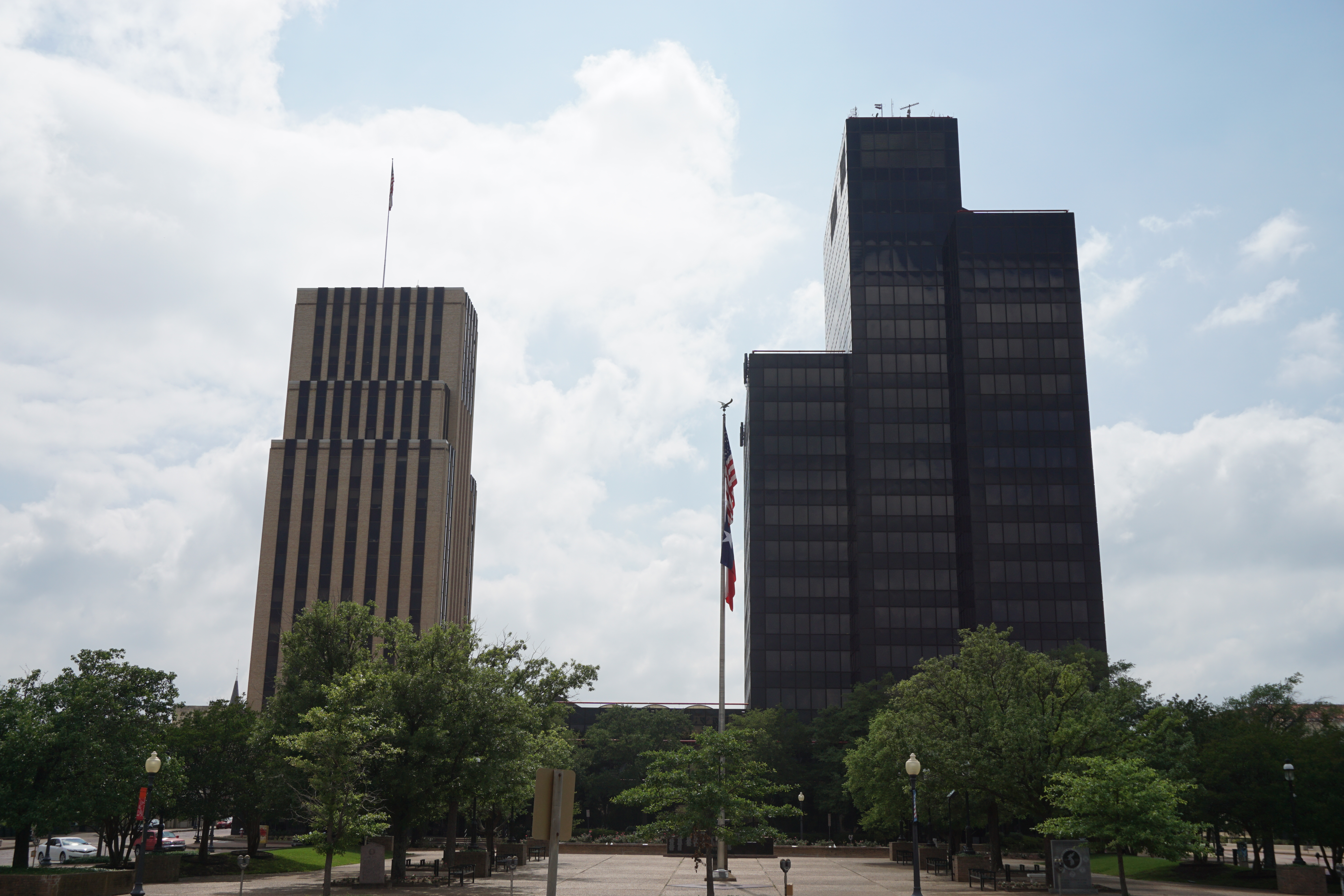
- Downtown Tyler

- Location in the United States
- Country: United States
- State: Texas
- Principal cities: Tyler

Area
  - Metro: 950 sq mi (2,460 km^{2})

Population (2010)
  - Density: 130/sq mi (50/km^{2})
  - Urban: 130,247 (US: 247th)
  - Urban density: 1,780/sq mi (688/km^{2})
  - MSA: 216,080
- Time zone: UTC-6 (CST)
  - Summer (DST): UTC-5 (CDT)

The Tyler metropolitan area, or Greater Tyler area centered on the city of Tyler, Texas, is one of the largest Texan metropolitan areas in East Texas. It had a combined population of 216,080 according to the 2010 U.S. census, and 233,479 in 2020. The Tyler metropolitan area encompasses all of Smith County.

== Geography ==
According to the U.S. Census Bureau, the county has a total area of 950 square miles (2,500 km^{2}), of which 921 square miles (2,390 km^{2}) are land and 28 square miles (73 km^{2}) (3.0%) are covered by water.

The county infrastructure includes some 1,180 miles (1,900 km) of two-lane county roads, 70% of which were rated "bad" or "poor" in 2004. The county commissioners court appointed a new county engineer in 2005 and initiated an aggressive reconstruction campaign. After the election of 2006, this reconstruction campaign was cut back by the court. During this period, a controversial pay increase for commissioners and the county judge was passed by a 3–2 vote. After heated protests from the public, the pay rates were eventually rolled back and new legislation was proposed in the state legislature to prohibit commissioners and county judges from authorizing raises for themselves during their first term of office.

=== Major highways ===
- Interstate 20
- U.S. Highway 69
- U.S. Highway 80
- U.S. Highway 271
- State Highway 31
- State Highway 57
- State Highway 64
- State Highway 110
- State Highway 135
- State Highway 155
- Loop 49
- Loop 323

== Communities ==
=== Cities ===
- Arp
- Hideaway
- Lindale
- New Chapel Hill
- Noonday
- Overton (partially in Rusk County)
- Tyler (principal city)
- Troup (partially in Cherokee County)
- Whitehouse

=== Towns ===
- Bullard (partially in Cherokee County)
- Winona

=== Unincorporated communities ===
- Bascom
- Carroll
- Chapel Hill
- Copeland
- Elberta
- Flint
- Garden Valley
- Gresham
- Jamestown
- Midway
- Mount Sylvan
- New Hope
- Owentown
- Pine Springs
- Red Springs
- Shady Grove
- Starrville
- Swan
- Teaselville
- Thedford

== Demographics ==
Historical population
Census	Pop.	Note	%±
1850	4,292		—
1860	13,392		212.0%
1870	16,532		23.4%
1880	21,863		32.2%
1890	28,324		29.6%
1900	37,370		31.9%
1910	41,746		11.7%
1920	46,769		12.0%
1930	53,123		13.6%
1940	69,090		30.1%
1950	74,701		8.1%
1960	86,350		15.6%
1970	97,096		12.4%
1980	128,366		32.2%
1990	151,309		17.9%
2000	174,706		15.5%
2010	209,714		20.0%
2020	233,479		11.3%
2022 (est.)	241,757		3.5%
U.S. Decennial Census; 1850–2010 2010–2020

Demographic Profile of Greater Tyler(NH = Non-Hispanic)
Race / Ethnicity	Pop 2010	Pop 2020	% 2010	% 2020
White alone (NH)	130,246	134,452	62.11%	57.59%
Black or African American alone (NH)	37,195	38,003	17.74%	16.28%
Native American or Alaska Native alone (NH)	734	746	0.35%	0.32%
Asian alone (NH)	2,550	4,129	1.22%	1.77%
Pacific Islander alone (NH)	63	77	0.03%	0.03%
Some Other Race alone (NH)	225	695	0.11%	0.30%
Mixed Race/Multi-Racial (NH)	2,613	8,096	1.25%	3.47%
Hispanic or Latino (any race)	36,088	47,281	17.21%	20.25%
Total	209,714	233,479	100.00%	100.00%

Note: the US Census treats Hispanic/Latino as an ethnic category. This table excludes Latinos from the racial categories and assigns them to a separate category. Hispanics/Latinos can be of any race.

According to the 2010 U.S. census, 209,714 people and 76,427 households were residing in the metropolitan. By the 2020 census, there were 233,479 people residing in the metropolitan area. According to the 2021 American Community Survey, its population increased to 237,186. In 2010, the population density was 227.6 people per square mile (87.9 people/km^{2}). The 87,309 housing units averaged 91.9 per mi^{2}.

The racial and ethnic makeup of the area in 2010 was 70.1% White, 17.9% African American, 0.5% Native American, 1.2% Asian, and 2.0% persons reporting two or more races. About 17.2% of the population was Hispanic or Latino of any race. Per 2021 ACS estimates, its racial makeup was 58% White, 17% Black or African American, 2% Asian American, 2% multiracial, and 21% Hispanic or Latino of any race.

In 2010, the median income for a household in the metropolis was $46,139. The per capita income was $25,374. About 15.4% of families and 13.80% of the population were below the poverty line. In 2021, its median income was $63,115 for a household; there was a per capita income of $31,682. An estimated 12.5% of the metropolitan population lived at or below the poverty line.

As of 2010, the age distribution was 26.60% under the age of 18, 9.80% from 18 to 24, 27.40% from 25 to 44, 22.10% from 45 to 64, and 14.10% who were 65 or older. The median age was 36 years. For every 100 females, there were 92.10 males. For every 100 females age 18 and over, there were 87.90 males. In 2021, Greater Tyler's median age was 37.4, and 51% was female.

Religiously and spiritually, Greater Tyler is predominantly Christian as part of the Bible Belt. In 2020, the Association of Religion Data Archives determined Baptists, non/inter-denominational Protestants, and Roman Catholics constituted the largest share of Christendom for the metropolitan statistical area. Among the Baptists, the Southern Baptist Convention was the largest single denomination with 55,663 members spread throughout 94 churches; non/inter-denominational Protestants numbered 22,788 in 76 churches, and Roman Catholics of the Tyler Diocese numbered 22,428 throughout 8 churches. Altogether, the American Baptist Associates, National Baptists of America, National Baptists, National Missionary Baptists, Progressive National Baptists, and Southern Baptists had 60,025 members.

Outside of the predominantly Baptist, ecumenical, and Roman Catholic communities, the same 2020 study tabulated 11,161 Methodists divided among the African Methodist Episcopal, Christian Methodist Episcopal, and United Methodist churches. There were 4,800 members of the Churches of Christ, and Pentecostalism reflected a substantial metropolitan population with 3,330 members of the Church of God in Christ, and 2,647 of the Assemblies of God USA.

In non-Christian religious communities, Greater Tylerites were had a minor influence from Conservative and Reform Jews numbering 254. The Association of Religion Data Archives estimated there were approximately 782 Muslims. According to a separate study by Sperling's BestPlaces in 2020, 0.4% of the total metropolitan population adhered to Islam, making it the largest non-Christian religion, but one of the smallest metropolitan Islamic populations in Texas.

== Economy ==
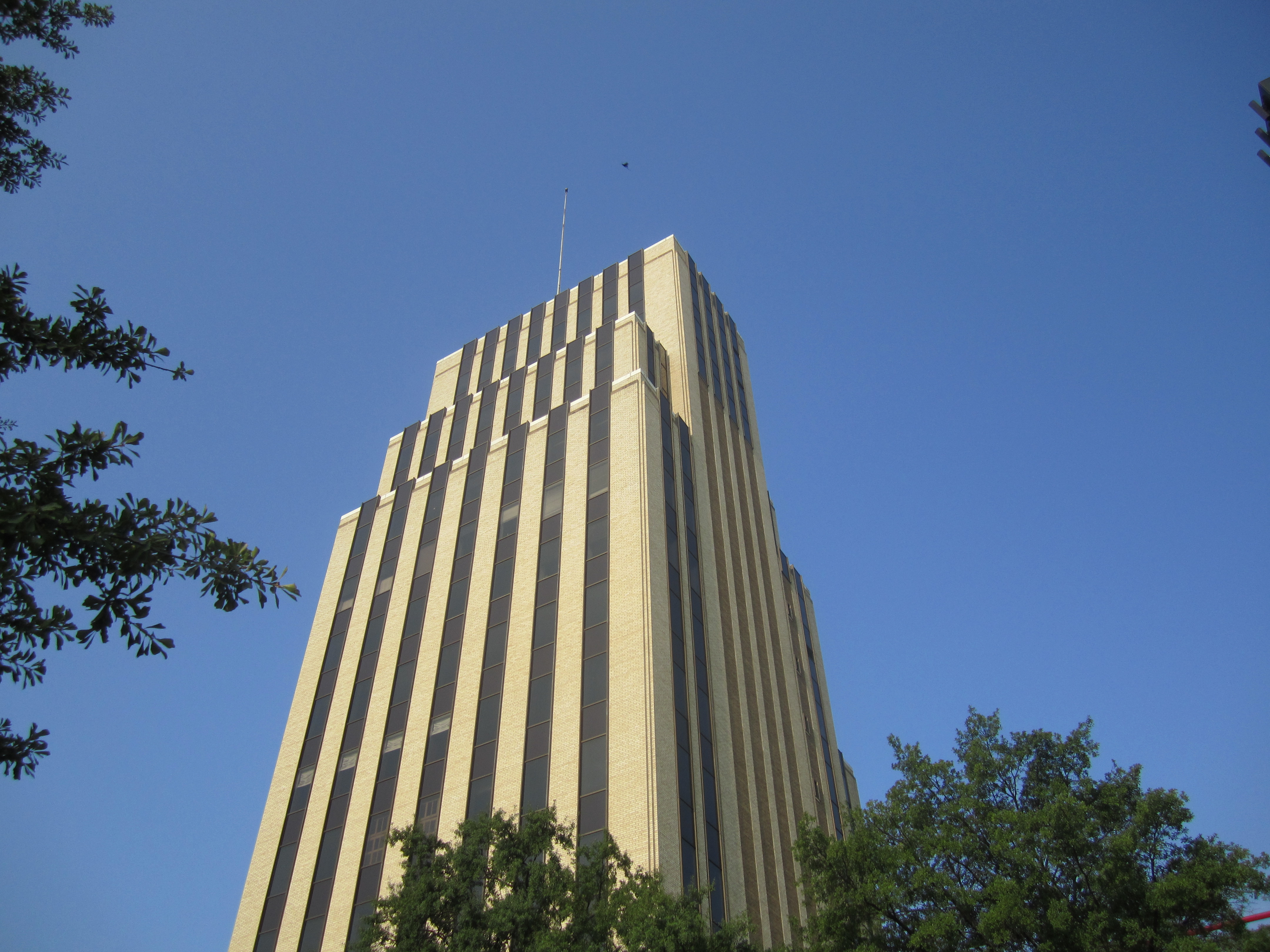
People's Petroleum building in downtown Tyler

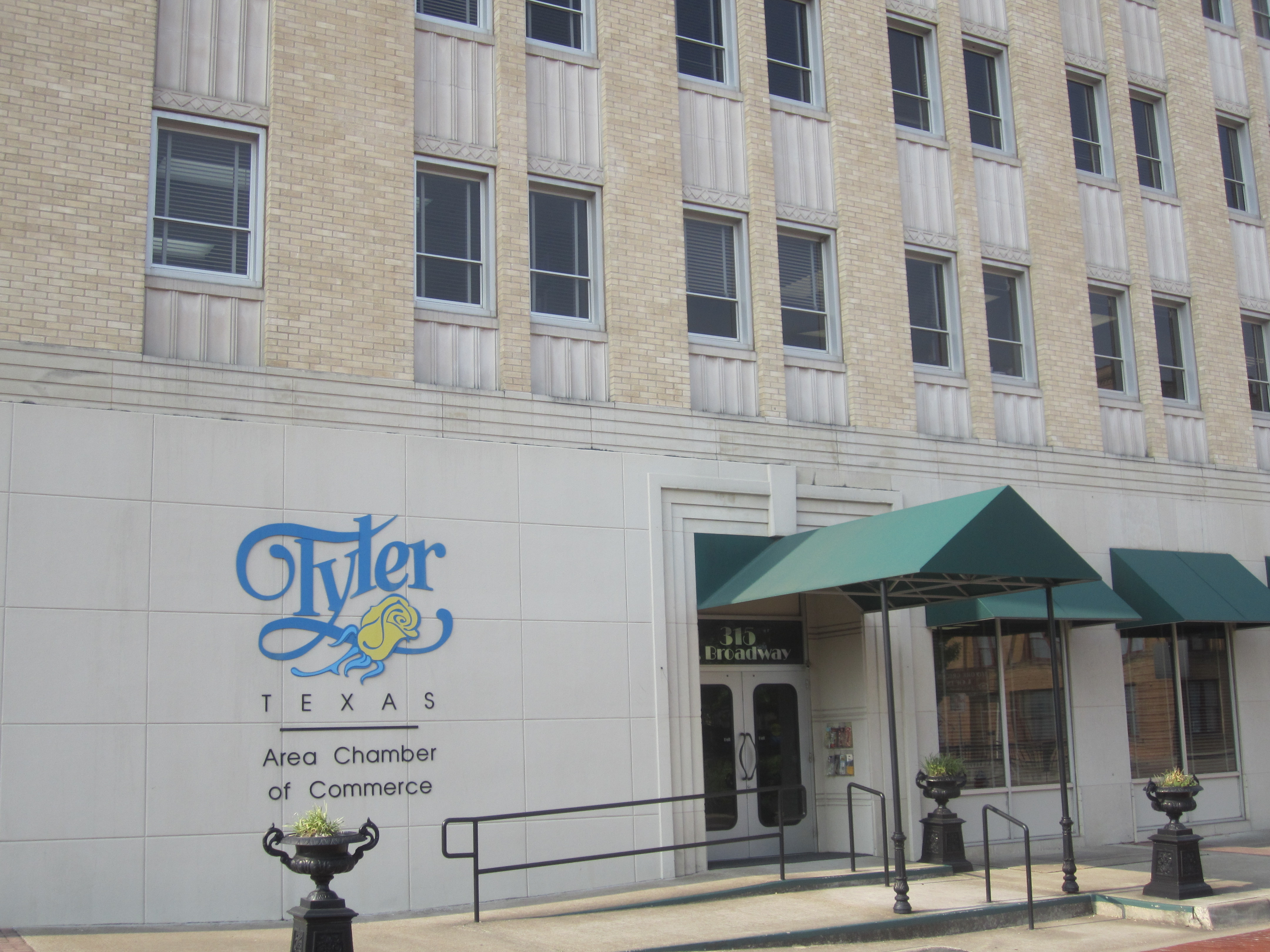
Chamber of Commerce office in downtown Tyler

In addition to the city's role in the rose-growing industry, Tyler city-proper is the headquarters for Brookshire Grocery Company, which operates Brookshire's, Fresh, Super 1 Foods, and Spring Market supermarkets in the Ark-La-Tex and parts of Dallas–Fort Worth. The company's main distribution center is in south Tyler, while SouthWest Foods, a subsidiary that processes dairy products, is just northeast of the city.

The city and metropolitan area also has a growing manufacturing sector including: Tyler Pipe, a subsidiary of McWane Inc. that produces soil and utility pipe products; Trane Technologies Inc., formerly a unit of American Standard Companies, which manufactures air conditioners and heat pumps (this plant was originally built in 1955 by General Electric); Delek Refining, an Israeli-owned oil refinery formerly La Gloria Oil and Gas Co (a Crown Central Petroleum subsidiary); PCSFerguson, an operating company of Dover Corporation that specializes in equipment for the measurement and production of natural gas using the plunger lift method; DYNAenergetics Tyler Distribution Center, part of DYNAenergetics USA, which manufactures perforating equipment and explosives for the oil and gas industry; and Vesuvius USA, a manufacturer of refractory ceramics used in the steel industry.

Beyond manufacturing and grocery markets, Tyler is the headquarters for Cavender's, Southside Bank, and Synthesizers.com. Other corporations with major presence within the metropolitan statistical area include AT&T, T-Mobile US, Cricket Wireless and Metro by T-Mobile, Chase Bank, BBVA, Best Buy, and Walmart. Tyler is also home to the Caldwell Zoo and Broadway Square Mall.

According to the city's 2012–2013 Comprehensive Annual Financial Report, the city of Tyler's top ten employers were:

#	Employer	# of Employees
1	Trinity Mother Frances Health System	3,775
2	UT Health - Tyler	3,153
3	Brookshire Grocery Company	2,599
4	Tyler Independent School District	2,468
5	Trane Technologies	1,500
6	SuddenLink	1,500
7	Walmart	1,311
8	The University of Texas at Tyler	1,121
9	UT Health - Tyler (north campus)	925
10	Tyler Junior College	862

== Sports ==
=== College and university teams ===
UT Tyler women's basketball team

- University of Texas at Tyler Patriots (NCAA Division II)
- Texas College Steers (HBCU)
- Tyler Junior College Apaches (NJCAA)

=== Baseball teams ===
- Tyler Elbertas (1912)
- Tyler Trojans (1924–1929, 1931, 1935–1940, 1946–1950)
- Tyler Sports (1932)
- Tyler Governors (1933–1934)
- Tyler East Texans (1950–1953)
- Tyler Tigers (1954–1955)
- Tyler Wildcatters (1994–1997)
- Tyler Roughnecks (2001)

=== Football ===
- East Texas Twisters (2004)

=== Road races ===
- Fresh 15 Road Race (Annual)

=== Soccer ===
- Tyler FC (2016–Present)

=== Disc golf ===
Tyler features fifteen disc golf courses and seven leagues, and the surrounding area features a total of thirty-six courses and seventeen leagues. For these reasons, users of the disc golf app UDisc ranked Tyler as the third best disc golf destination in Texas and second best in the United States.

== Education ==
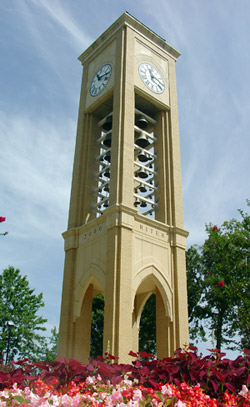
The Riter Tower at University of Texas at Tyler

The metropolitan area's higher education institutions include the University of Texas at Tyler and the University of Texas Health Center at Tyler, both part of the University of Texas System, as well as Tyler Junior College and Texas College.

== Media ==
Currently, 18 media outlets and one newspaper are located in Tyler, as well as many more in the surrounding areas.

=== Newspaper ===
- Tyler Morning Telegraph

=== Television ===
VHF/UHF Channel	Call Letters	Network
7	KLTV	ABC
19	KYTX	CBS
51	KFXK-TV	FOX
56	KETK	NBC

=== Radio ===
==== AM stations ====
Frequency	Call Letters	Format	Name
600	KTBB	News/Talk	
1330	KGLD	Gospel	The Light
1490	KYZS		

==== FM stations ====
Frequency	Call Letters	Format	Name
88.7	KLOVE	Christian Contemporary	KLOVE
89.5	KVNE	Christian Contemporary	Encouragement FM
91.3	KGLY	Religious	
92.1	KRWR	Sports	ESPN East Texas
93.1	KTYL	Hot Adult Contemporary	Mix 93.1
96.1	KKTX	Classic Rock	Classic Rock 96.1
96.7	KOYE	Spanish	La Invasora
99.3	KAPW	Spanish Pop	Mega 99.3
101.5	KNUE	Country	
102.3	KLFZ	Top 40	The Breeze
102.7	KBLZ	Urban Contemporary	The Blaze
104.1	KKUS	Classic Country	The Ranch
106.5	KOOI	Classic Hits	Sunny 106.5
107.3	KISX	Urban Adult Contemporary	Hot1073Jamz

== Transportation ==
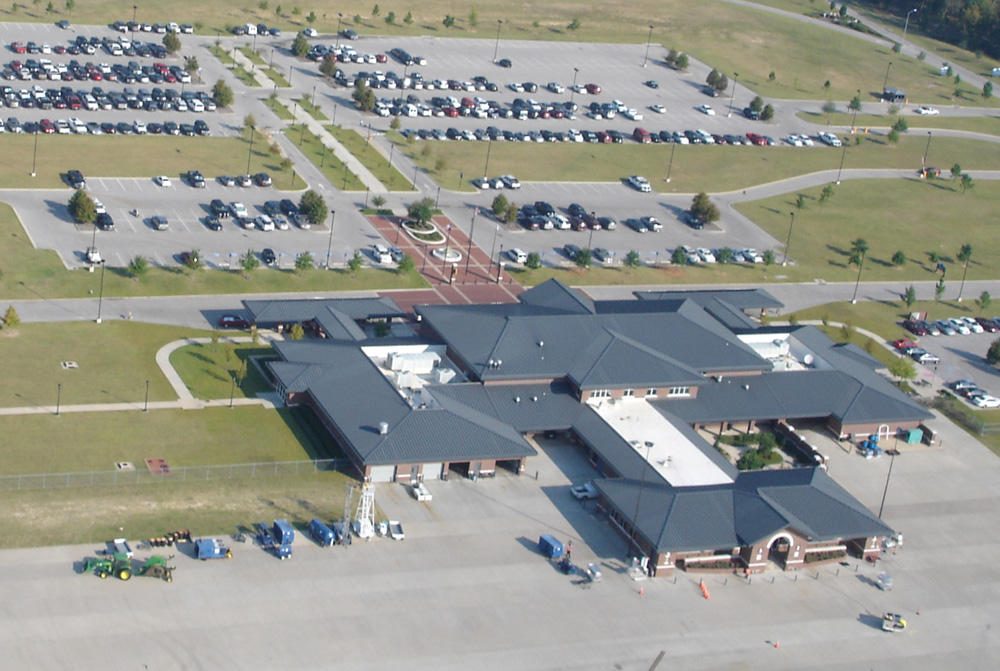
Aerial photo of Tyler Pounds Regional Airport

The most common form of transportation is the motor vehicle. Tyler is a nexus of several major highways. Interstate 20 runs along the north edge of the city going east and west, U.S. Highway 69 runs north–south through the center of town and State Highway 64 runs east–west through the city. Tyler also has access to U.S. Highway 271, State Highway 31, State Highway 155, and State Highway 110. Loop 323 was established in 1957 and encircles the city, which has continued to grow outside of this loop. Loop 49 is a limited access "outer loop" around the city and currently runs from State Highway 110 south of Tyler to US 69 northwest of Tyler near Lindale. Loop 124 is 1.524 mi (2.453 km) in length.

=== Public transportation ===
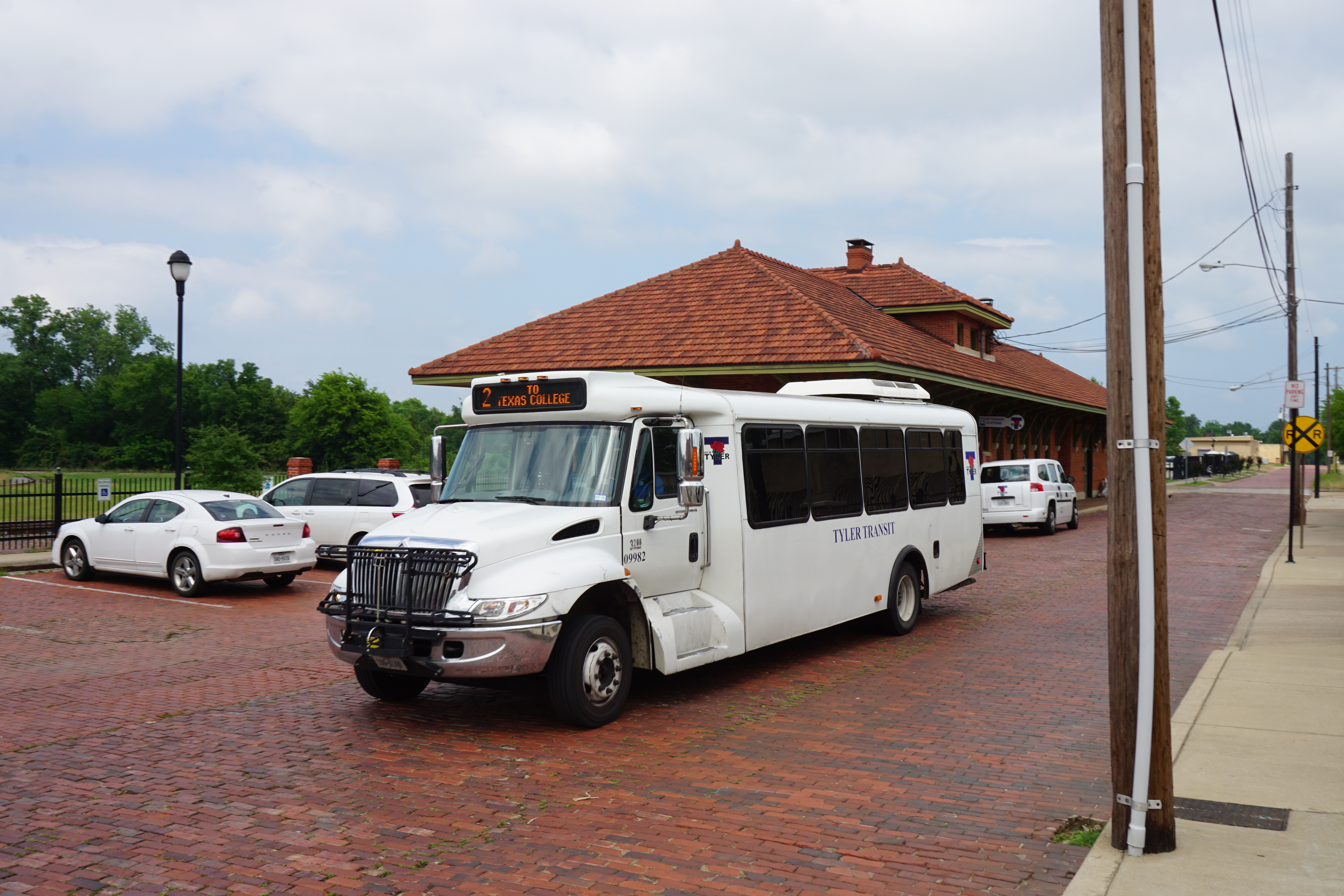
Tyler Transit shuttle

Tyler Transit provides customers with public transportation service within the City of Tyler. The buses run daily, excluding Sundays and holidays. Tyler Transit offers customers the option to purchase tickets, tokens, or passes at the Tyler Transit office, at 210 E. Oakwood Street inside the Cotton Belt Railroad Depot at the main transfer point. The City of Tyler paratransit service is a shared-ride, public transportation service. Requests for service must be made the day before the service is needed. Trips can be scheduled up to 14 days in advance. ADA compliant paratransit service is provided to all origins and destinations within the service area defined as the city limits of Tyler. Greyhound Lines bus service is available through a downtown terminal.

=== Air ===
Tyler Pounds Regional Airport offers service to and from Dallas–Fort Worth International Airport via American Eagle, providing service with Embraer ERJ-170, ERJ-175 and Bombardier CRJ-700 regional jets. General Aviation services are provided by two fixed-base operators, Johnson Aviation and the Jet Center of Tyler.

=== Train ===
Tyler was the hub for a series of short-line railroads which later evolved into the St. Louis Southwestern Railway, better known as "The Cotton Belt Route," with the city last being a stop on the unnamed successor to the Morning Star between St. Louis and Dallas. This line later became part of the Southern Pacific Railroad, which itself merged with the Union Pacific Railroad, which continues to serve the city today with freight traffic. No passenger train service to Tyler has occurred since April 1956, but Amtrak's Texas Eagle runs through the city of Mineola, a short distance north of Tyler.

=== Walkability ===
A 2014 study by Walk Score ranked Tyler with a walkability score of 32 (out of 100) with some amenities within walking distance.
