= Browning, Texas =

Unincorporated community in Smith County, Texas, United States

- Unincorporated community
- Location within Texas Location within the United States
- Coordinates: 32°23′02″N 95°05′03″W
- Country: United States
- State: Texas
- County: Smith
- Elevation: 453 ft (138 m)
- Time zone: UTC-6 (Central (CST))
  - Summer (DST): UTC-5 (CDT)
- Area codes: 430 & 903
- GNIS feature ID: 1378055

Browning is an unincorporated community in Smith County, Texas, United States.

== History ==
Browning is on Farm to Market Road 2767 (known locally as Old Kilgore Highway) and the eastern edge of the Chapel Hill oilfield nine miles southeast of Winona. The town was named for Isaiah Nicholas Browning (1827–1915), who, with his wife, Mary Ann Morrison (maiden; 1830–1904), was, beginning around 1850, among its earliest settlers. In the early 1870s, the Brownings built the first large house there, which, in 1990, was still standing. The first post office in Browning opened in 1879. William A. Owens was its first postmaster. Isaiah Browning, in 1884, owned a gin and gristmill; and, in partnership with Bradshaw, owned the general store.

In 1898 the post office moved to Starrville, but moved back to Browning in 1899, then in 1902, back to Starrville. During the 1890s the population plateaued at around fifty, and included a sawmill, a church, a district school, and a saloon. In 1903, Browning had two one-teacher schools, one with fifty-one white students and the other with forty-seven black students. By 1933 the town reported a population of twenty-five and one business. Records for 1936 show no school at the community, and by 1952 local students attended classes in the Holts Independent School District.

== See also ==
- List of unincorporated communities in Texas
