= George W. Stidham =

American military officer (1818–1888)

- Born: September 8, 1818; Lexington County, South Carolina, US
- Died: December 26, 1888 (aged 70); Smith County, Texas, US
- Military career
- Allegiance: Confederate States of America: Confederate Texas
- Branch: Texas State Forces
- Rank: Lieutenant Colonel
- Unit: 1st Cavalry Regiment
- Conflicts: American Civil War

George W. Stidham (September 8, 1818 – December 26, 1888) was an American farmer and Confederate States Army officer. He was born in Lexington County, South Carolina, to Zachariah and Jane Stidham. In c. 1839, he married Martha George of Georgia, having eight children together. He moved to Smith County, Texas, owning a farm there by 1860. In 1863, he enlisted as a lieutenant colonel in the 1st Texas State Cavalry Regiment. He later served as a private under James G. Bourland. He died on December 26, 1888, in Smith County, and was buried in Swan.
