= Tillit Sidney Teddlie =

American singer

- Born: June 3, 1885; Swan (Smith County, Texas)
- Died: August 17, 1987 (aged 102); Gunter, Texas
- Burial place: Forest Park Cemetery, Greenville, Texas
- Other names: Tillet S. Teddlie; T. S. Teddlie
- Occupations: teacher, composer, publisher, minister
- Employer: Church of Christ
- Known for: Christian songs
- Notable work: "What Will Your Answer Be?" (1935), "Heaven Holds All to Me" (1932)
- Spouse: Edna Webb (?-1959; her death)

Tillit Sidney Teddlie (June 3, 1885 – August 17, 1987) was an American singing school teacher, composer, publisher, and minister of the Church of Christ.

Teddlie was born June 3 1885, at Swan, Texas (Smith County), the son of Theodore and Sarah Ann (Porter) Teddlie. In 1903, he was baptized into Christ, and also taught his first shape note singing school, which lasted for two weeks. He composed his first song in 1906. During his lifetime, Teddlie taught singing schools for 61 years, composed 130 songs, published 14 song books, and served as a full-time evangelist, including preaching for the Johnson Street Church of Christ (1945–1951) and Central Church of Christ in Greenville, Texas, and Churches of Christ in Ennis, Sulphur Springs, Lone Oak and Quinlan.

== Personal life and death ==
Tillit S. Teddlie married Edna Webb (1880–1959). They had one son, Pete. Teddlie died on August 17, 1987, in Gunter, Texas, aged 102. He is buried in the Forest Park Cemetery at Greenville, Texas. Upon his grave stone is inscribed the title of one of his most popular hymns - "Heaven Holds All To Me".

== Titles of some of Teddlie's songs ==
- A Joyful Song
- Be Not Anxious
- Cast All Your Burdens on The Lord
- Don't Wait Too Long
- God Sent His Own Son
- Hear Me When I Call
- Heaven Holds All To Me
- I Remember Jesus
- In Heaven They're Singing
- In The Service of My King
- May This My Glory Be
- O God of Infinite Mercy
- O the Depth and the Riches
- Oft We Come Together, "True Worship"
- Round the Hills in Galilee
- Safe In The Harbor
- Singing Redemption's Song
- Songs of Salvation
- Swiftly We're Turning
- The Master's Touch
- Thou Wilt Keep Him
- Time Enough Yet
- We Shall Meet Someday
- What Will Your Answer Be?
- When We Meet In Sweet Communion, "The Lord's Supper"
- Worthy Art Thou
- You Can Lead Someone To Jesus

== Heaven Holds All to Me ==
Teddlie was a member of and ministered in the churches of Christ, but many of his songs reached popular circulation among Christians of the denominations, especially through the Stamps-Baxter Music Company. Two of his best known are "What Will Your Answer Be?" (1935) and "Heaven Holds All to Me" (1932).

Earth holds no treasures
But perish with using,
However precious they be;
Yet there's a country
To which I am going:
Heaven holds all to me.
