= Wood Springs =

Wood Springs may refer to the following places in the United States:

- Wood Springs, Texas
- Wood Springs, Ganado, Arizona
  - Wood Springs 2 Fire, 2020

== See also ==
- Woodspring, Somerset, England
