= Winona School District =

Winona School District may refer to:

- Winona Independent School District, based in Winona, Texas
- Winona Separate School District, based in Winona, Mississippi
- Winona Area Public Schools, in Winona, Minnesota
