= Sand Flat =

Sand Flat may refer to:

- Sand Flat, Johnson County, Texas, U.S., an unincorporated community
- Sand Flat, Smith County, Texas, U.S., an unincorporated community
- Sand Flat, Van Zandt County, Texas, U.S., an unincorporated community in Van Zandt County, Texas

== See also ==
- Mudflat, a type of coastal wetland
