= Elberta =

Elberta may refer to a location in the United States:

- Elberta, Alabama, a town
- Elberta, Georgia, an unincorporated place
- Elberta, Michigan, a village
- Elberta, Pennsylvania, a census-designated place
- Elberta, Texas, an unincorporated community
- Elberta, Utah, a census-designated place

== Other uses ==
- "Elberta", a type of peach
