= Thedford =

Thedford may refer to:

- Thedford, Nebraska, a village in the United States
- Thedford, Ontario, a town in Canada
- Thedford, Texas, an unincorporated community in Smith County, Texas

== See also ==
- Thetford (disambiguation)
