= Tremain Mack =

American football player and coach (born 1974)

No. 34
- Position: Safety

Personal information
- Born: November 21, 1974 (age 51); Tyler, Texas, U.S.
- Listed height: 6 ft 1 in (1.85 m)
- Listed weight: 195 lb (88 kg)

Career information
- High school: Chapel Hill (Tyler)
- College: Miami (FL)
- NFL draft: 1997: 4th round, 111th overall pick

Career history

Playing
- Cincinnati Bengals (1997–2000); Louisville Fire (2004); San Jose SaberCats (2005–2006)

Coaching
- Mount Rainier High School Head coach (2012–present)

Awards and highlights
- Pro Bowl (1999); Big East Special Teams Player of the Year (1996)

Career NFL statistics
- Kickoff return yards: 3,583
- Stats at Pro Football Reference

Tremain Ferrell Mack (born November 21, 1974), also known as "T-Mack", is an American former professional football player who was a safety and return specialist for four seasons with the Cincinnati Bengals of the National Football League (NFL). He played college football for the Miami Hurricanes and was selected by the Bengals in the fourth round of the 1997 NFL draft. In 1998, he finished second in the American Football Conference (AFC) with 1,165 yards on 45 kickoff returns. He was later selected to the 2000 Pro Bowl.

Mack retired as the Bengals all-time leader in kick return yards with 3,583.

Mack is currently the head coach of the Mount Rainier High School Rams.

== Early life ==
Mack was born in Tyler, Texas and attended Chapel Hill High School. After graduating, he was selected by the Kansas City Royals. From 1993 to 1996, he attended the University of Miami where he played football, baseball and was on the track team.

== Professional career ==
Mack was selected in the fourth round (111th overall) by the Cincinnati Bengals where he played for four seasons. As a rookie, he started four games and recorded one interception. In his second season, he became the team's primary return specialist, recording 1,165 return yards for the season. In 1999, he recorded a career high 1,382 return yards and earned a trip to the 1999 Pro Bowl along with teammate Corey Dillon. In 2000, Mack recorded 1,036 return yards in his final NFL season.

After three years out of football, Mack spent one season with the Louisville Fire of af2. That was followed by two season with the San Jose SaberCats of the Arena Football League (AFL). He set the AFL rookie record for consecutive Defensive Player of the Week honors.

== Coaching career ==
Mack is currently the head coach of the Mount Rainier High School Rams.
