= Emerald Bay =

Emerald Bay may refer to:

== Geography ==
- Emerald Bay, Catalina Island, California
- Emerald Bay, Orange County, California
- Emerald Bay State Park in El Dorado County, California
- Emerald Bay, Lake Arrowhead, California
- Emerald Bay, Texas

== Other ==
- A code name for the Intel EB440BX chipset
- Emerald Bay Records, a record label
- "Emerald Bay (Prionace Glauca)", a track from the Giant Squid album The Ichthyologist
- Several of the tallest buildings in Myanmar

== See also ==
- Emerald Cove, Antarctica
