= Ernie Holmes =

American football player (1948–2008)

No. 63
- Position: Defensive tackle

Personal information
- Born: July 11, 1948; Jamestown, Texas, U.S.
- Died: January 17, 2008 (aged 59); Beaumont, Texas, U.S.
- Listed height: 6 ft 3 in (1.91 m)
- Listed weight: 260 lb (118 kg)

Career information
- High school: Burkeville Independent School District
- College: Texas Southern
- NFL draft: 1971: 8th round, 203rd overall pick

Career history
- Pittsburgh Steelers (1971–1977); New England Patriots (1978)

Awards and highlights
- 2× Super Bowl champion (IX, X); Second-team All-Pro (1974)

Career NFL statistics
- Games played: 84
- Games started: 58
- Stats at Pro Football Reference

Earnest Lee Holmes (July 11, 1948 – January 17, 2008) was an American professional football defensive tackle who played in the National Football League (NFL) for seven seasons, primarily with the Pittsburgh Steelers. Nicknamed "Fats", he played college football for the Texas Southern Tigers was selected by the Steelers in the eighth round of the 1971 NFL draft. Holmes spent six seasons in Pittsburgh, receiving one second-team All-Pro selection and winning two consecutive Super Bowl titles. In his final season, he was a member of the New England Patriots.

== Early life ==
Holmes was born in Jamestown, Texas, and was raised on his family's farm, attending school in Wiergate Holmes played college football at Texas Southern University.

== Professional career ==
Holmes was selected 203rd overall by Pittsburgh Steelers in the eighth round of the 1971 NFL draft. He was part of the legendary Steel Curtain defense along with fellow linemen Joe Greene, Dwight White, and L. C. Greenwood. While quarterback sacks were not an official NFL statistic until 1982, the Steelers credit Holmes with a career total of 40, eighth on the franchise's all-time list. This includes team-high totals of 11 in 1974 (including a stretch of six consecutive games with a sack, which ties him with Greene and Greg Lloyd for the longest such streak in team history) and 10.5 in 1975.

"Ernie was one of the toughest players to ever wear a Steelers uniform, at his best, he was an intimidating player who even the toughest of opponents did not want to play against."

— Steelers chairman Dan Rooney

He was intensely fierce on the playing field and was often characterized as the most feared man on the Steelers defense. Prior to his third season in 1973, Holmes had an emotional breakdown while driving on the Ohio Turnpike on March 16, firing shots at a police helicopter as it pursued him. He was charged with shooting at a Highway Patrol heli-pilot. Holmes was found in a field near his abandoned car in Goshen Township, Mahoning County, Ohio. When apprehended, he threw his gun away and put his hands up. He was given five years' probation. Diagnosed with acute paranoid psychosis, he was believed to be depressed and having marital troubles.

Holmes played six seasons with the Steelers before being traded due to on-going weight problems in 1978 to the Tampa Bay Buccaneers, where he failed to make the team coming out of preseason. He played three games for the New England Patriots that season before retiring.

Holmes' number 63 was later issued to All-Pro center Dermontti Dawson. The number has since been taken out of circulation as being "unofficially retired" in honor of Dawson, who was inducted into the Pro Football Hall of Fame in 2012.

== Other activities ==
Following the end of his NFL career, Holmes became a wrestler and actor. He made one film appearance in 1985's Fright Night as a bouncer killed by Chris Sarandon's vampire character. The following year, Holmes appeared in WrestleMania 2 and made other appearances as a professional wrestler. He also appeared in an episode of The A-Team.

== Personal life and death ==
Until his death, Holmes lived in Texas on a ranch near Wiergate, a small town with a population of 461 near the Louisiana border, where he had his own church and was an ordained minister.

Holmes died in a one-car accident near Beaumont, Texas on the night of January 17, 2008. He was driving alone when his car left the road and rolled several times, about 80 miles (130 km) from Houston, according to a Texas Department of Public Safety dispatcher. Holmes was thrown from his car and was pronounced dead at the scene, according to the Texas Department of Transportation. He had not been wearing a seat belt.

Holmes was buried at the Pine Hill Cemetery in Jamestown, Texas.

== Filmography ==
Year	Title	Role	Notes
1985	Fright Night	Bouncer #2	

== See also ==
- List of gridiron football players who became professional wrestlers
