= Camel train =

Caravan, series of camels carrying passengers and goods

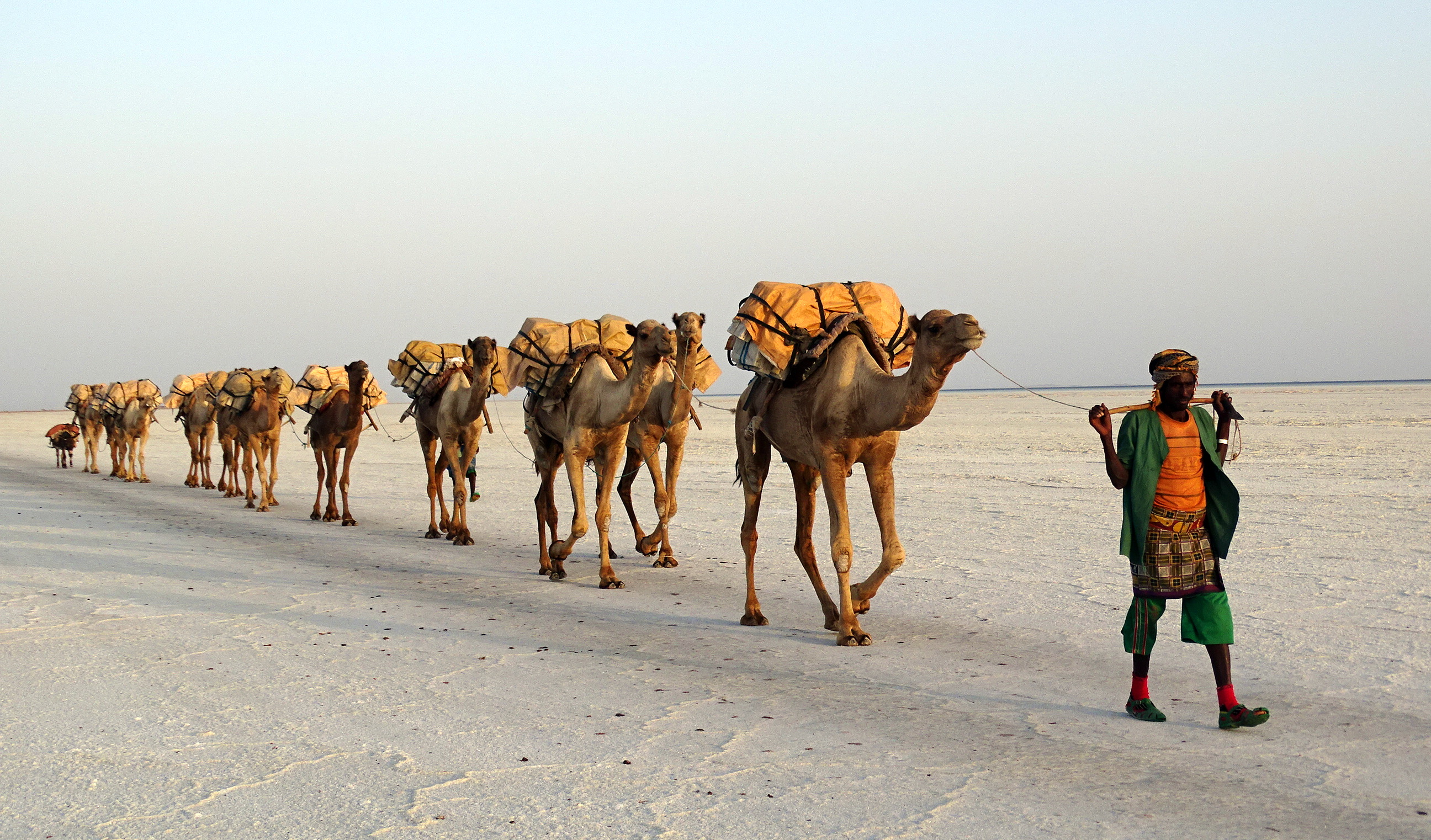
A contemporary camel caravan for salt transportation in Lake Karum in Afar Region, Ethiopia

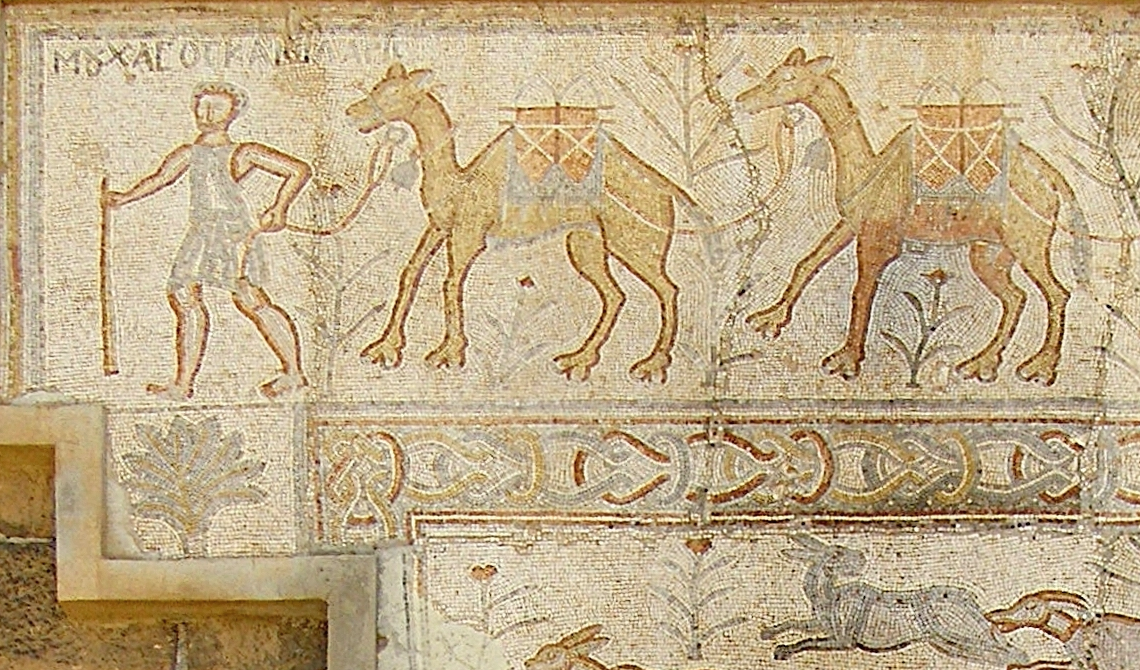
Ancient Roman mosaic depicting a merchant leading a camel train. Bosra, Syria

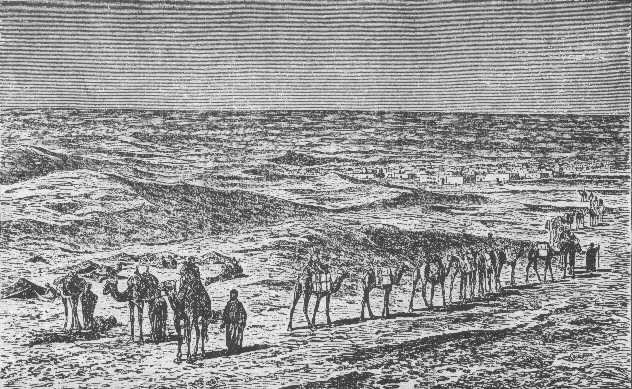
"Caravan Approaching a City in the Vast Desert of Sahara", from: Stanley and the White Heroes in Africa, by H. B. Scammel, 1890

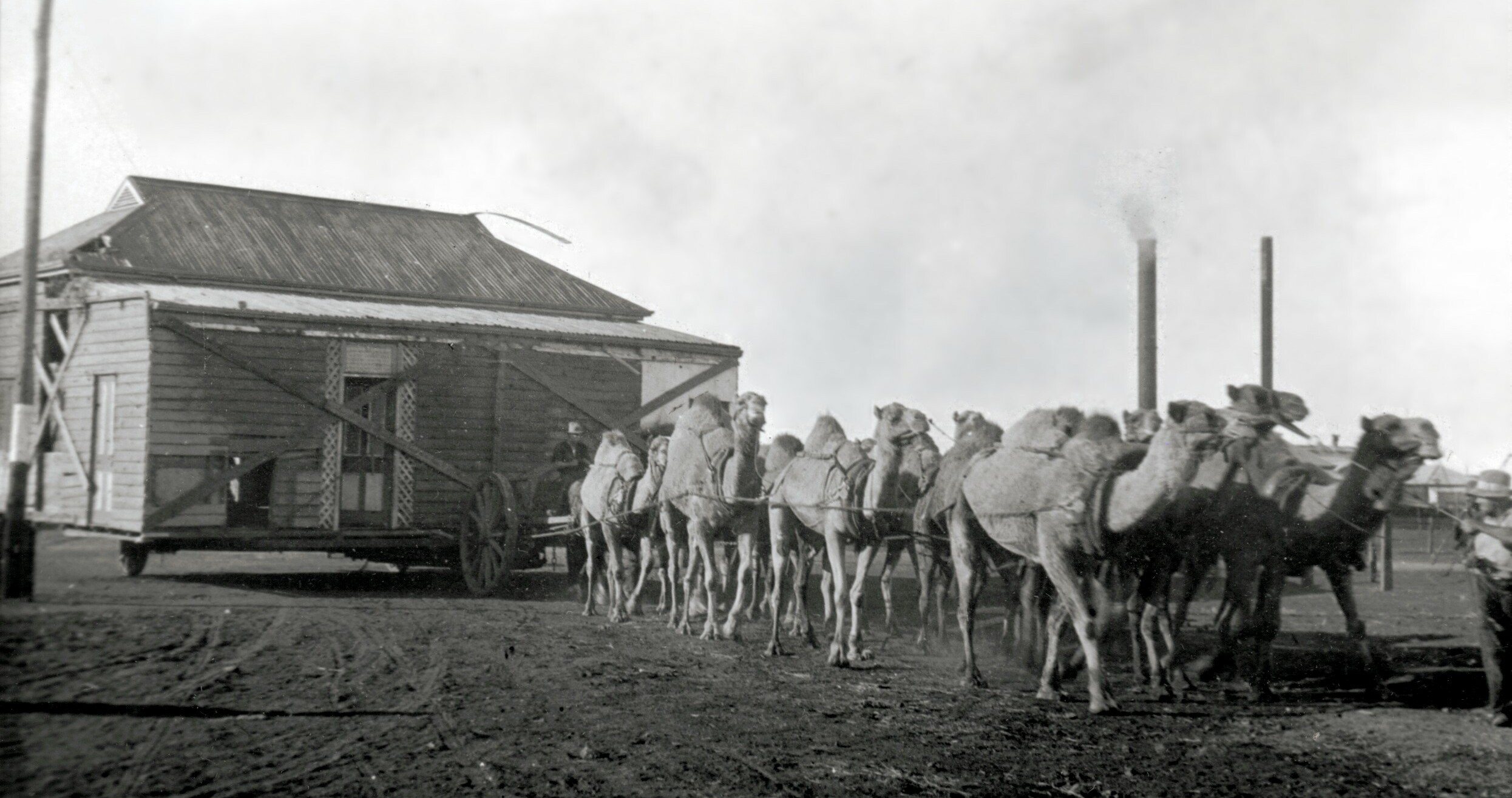
Camel train transporting a house, Kalgoorlie, Western Australia, ca. 1928

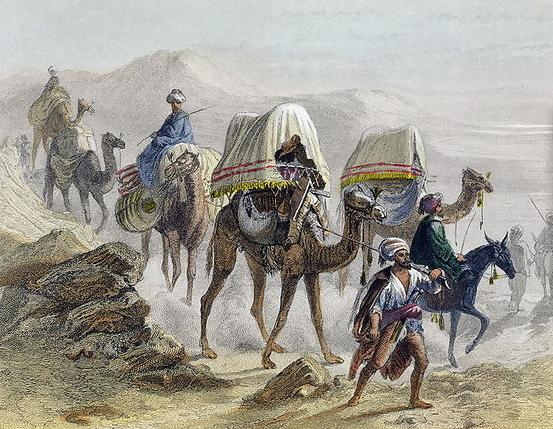
Camels with a howdah, by Émile and Adolphe Rouargue, 1855

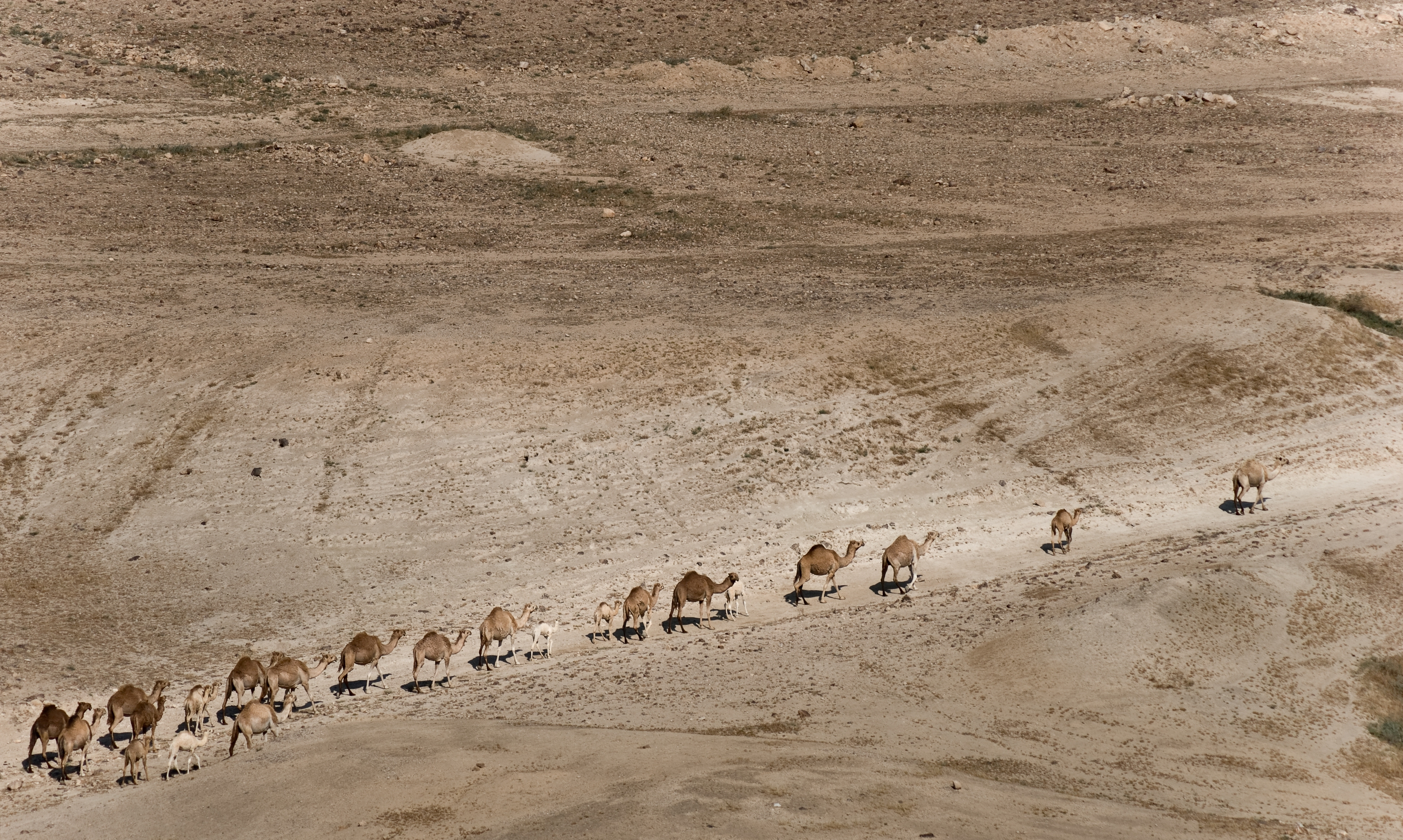
Camel convoy in the Jordan Rift Valley, West Bank, May 2010

A camel train, caravan, or camel string is a series of camels carrying passengers and goods on a regular or semi-regular service between points. Despite rarely travelling faster than human walking speed, for centuries camels' ability to withstand harsh conditions made them ideal for communication and trade in the desert areas of North Africa and the Arabian Peninsula. Camel trains were also used sparingly elsewhere around the globe. Since the early 20th century they have been largely replaced by motorized vehicles or air traffic.

== Africa, Asia and the Middle East ==
By far, the greatest use of camel trains occurs between North and West Africa by the Tuareg, Shuwa and Hassaniyya, as well as by culturally-affiliated groups like the Toubou, Hausa and Songhay. These camel trains conduct trade in and around the Sahara Desert and Sahel. Trains travel as far south as central Nigeria and northern Cameroon in the west, and northern Kenya in the east of the continent. In antiquity, the Arabian Peninsula was an important route for the trade with India and Abyssinia.

Camel trains have also long been used in portions of trans-Asian trade, including the Silk Road. As late as the early twentieth century, camel caravans played an important role connecting the Beijing/Shanxi region of eastern China with Mongolian centers (Urga, Uliastai, Kobdo) and Xinjiang. The routes went across Inner and Outer Mongolia. According to Owen Lattimore, who spent five months in 1926 crossing the northern edge of China (from Hohhot to Gucheng, via Inner Mongolia) with a camel caravan, demand for caravan trade was only increased by the arrival of foreign steamships into Chinese ports and the construction of the first railways in eastern China, as they improved access to the world market for such products of western China as wool.

== Australia ==
In the English-speaking world the term "camel train" often applies to Australia, notably the service that once connected a railhead at Oodnadatta in South Australia to Alice Springs in the center of the continent. The service ended when the Central Australia Railway line was extended to Alice Springs in 1929; that train is called The Ghan, a shortened version of "Afghan Express", and its logo is camel and rider, in honor of the "Afghan cameleers" who pioneered the route.

== North America ==
United States

The history of camel trains in the United States consists mainly of an experiment by the United States Army. On April 29, 1856, thirty-three camels and five drivers arrived at Indianola, Texas. While camels were suited to the job of transport in the American Southwest, the experiment failed. Their stubbornness and aggressiveness made them unpopular among soldiers, and they frightened horses. Many of the camels were sold to private owners, others escaped into the desert. These feral camels continued to be sighted through the early 20th century, with the last reported sighting in 1941 near Douglas, Texas.

British Columbia, Canada

Camels were used from 1862 to 1863, in British Columbia, Canada during the Cariboo Gold Rush.

== Camel caravan organization ==
While organization of camel caravans varied over time and the territory traversed, Owen Lattimore's account of caravan life in northern China in the 1920s gives a good idea of what camel transport is like. In his Desert Road to Turkestan he describes mostly camel caravans run by Han Chinese and Hui firms from eastern China (Hohhot, Baotou) or Xinjiang (Qitai (then called Gucheng), Barkol), plying the routes connecting those two regions through the Gobi Desert by way of Inner (or, before Mongolia's independence, Outer) Mongolia. Before Outer Mongolia's effective independence of China (circa 1920) the same firms also ran caravans into Urga, Uliassutai, and other centers of Outer Mongolia, and to the Russian border at Kyakhta, but with the creation of an international border, those routes came into decline. Less important caravan routes served various other areas of northern China, such as most centers in today's Gansu, Ningxia, and northern Qinghai. Some of the oldest Hohhot-based caravan firms had a history dating to the early Qing dynasty.

=== Camels ===
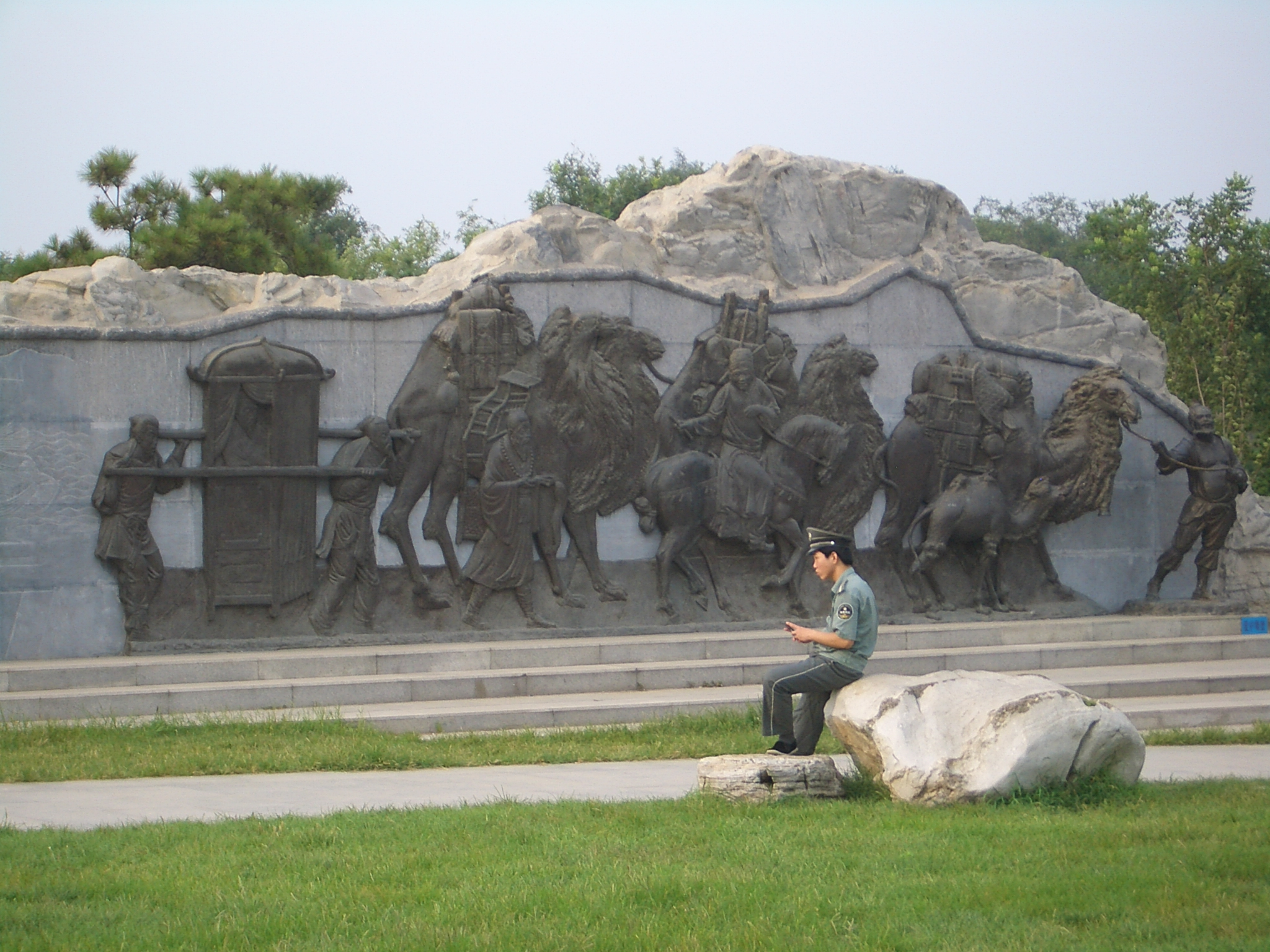
A modern sculptor's depiction of (the head of) a caravan approaching Beijing, complete with a camel-puller and a mounted caravan master, head cook, or xiansheng riding next to him. In the deserts of Mongolia, one would not see a dignitary in a sedan chair travelling along, nor would a baby camel accompany its mother.

Caravans originating from both ends of the Hohhot-Gucheng route were composed of two-humped Bactrian camels, suitable for the climate on the area, although very occasionally one could see single-humped dromedaries brought to this route by Uighur ("Turki", in Lattimore's parlance) caravan people from Hami A caravan would be normally composed of a number of files (Chinese: 连, lian), of up to 18 camels each. Each of the rank-and-file caravan men, known as the camel-pullers (Chinese: 拉骆驼的, la luotuo-de), was in charge of one such file. On the march, the camel-puller's job was to lead the first camel of his file by a rope tied to a peg attached to its nose, each of the other camels of the file being led by means of similar rope by the camel in front of it. Two files (lian) formed a ba, and the camel-pullers of the two files would help each other when loading cargo on the camels at the beginning of each day's march or unloading it when halted. To do their job properly camel-pullers had to be experts on camels: as Lattimore comments, "because there is no good doctoring known for him [a camel] when he is sick, they must learn how to keep him well." Taking care of camels' health included the ability to find the best available grazing for them and keeping them away from poisonous plants; knowledge of when one should not allow a camel to drink too much water; how to park camels for the night, allowing them to obtain the best possible shelter from wind-blown snow in winter; how to properly distribute the load to prevent it from hurting the animal; and how to treat minor injuries of the camels, such as blisters or pack-sores.

The loading of camels was described by Mildred Cable and Francesca French in their book Through Jade Gate and Central Asia (1927): «In the loading of a camel its grumblings commence as the first bale is placed on its back, and continue uninterruptedly until the load is equal to its strength, but as soon as it shows signs of being in excess, the grumbling ceases suddenly, and then the driver says: "Enough! put no more on this beast!"»

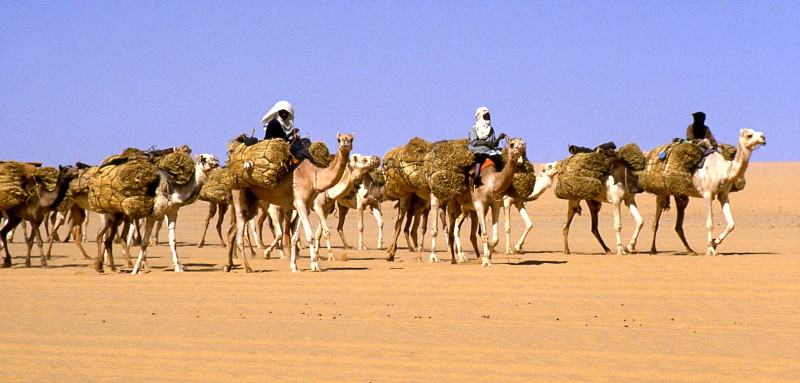
Azalai salt caravan practiced by Tuareg traders in the Sahara desert. The French reported that the 1906 caravan numbered 20,000 camels.

=== Caravan people ===
A caravan could consist of 150 or so camels (8 or more files), with a camel-puller for each file. Besides the camel-pullers the caravan would also include a xiansheng (先生, literally, "Sir", "Mister") (typically, an older man with a long experience as a camel-puller, now playing the role of a general manager), one or two cooks, and the caravan master, whose authority over the caravan and its people was as absolute as that of a captain on a ship. If the owner of the caravan did not travel with the caravan himself, he would send along a supercargo — the person who will take care of the disposal of the freight upon arrival, but had no authority during the journey. The caravan could carry a number of paying passengers as well, who would alternate between riding on top of a camel load and walking.

Camel-pullers' salary was quite low (around 2 silver taels a month in 1926, which would not be enough even for shoes and clothing he wore out while walking with his camels), although they were also fed and provided with tent space at the caravan owner's expense. Those people worked not so much for the wages as for the benefit of carrying some cargo—half of a camel load, or a full load—of their own on the caravan's camels; when successfully sold at the destination, it would bring a handy profit. Even more importantly, if a camel-puller could afford to buy a camel or a few of his own, he was allowed to include them into his file, and to collect the carriage-money for the cargo (assigned by the caravan owner) that they would carry. Once the camel-puller got rich enough to own close to a full file of 18 camels, he could join the caravan not as an employee but as a kind of a partner—now instead of earning wages he would be paying money (around 20 taels per round-trip in 1926) to the owner of (the rest of) the caravan for the benefit of joining the caravan, sharing in the food, etc.

=== Diet ===
The caravan people's food was mostly based around oat and millet flour, with some animal fat. A sheep would be bought from the Mongols and slaughtered every now and then, and tea was the usual daily drink; as fresh vegetables were scarce, scurvy was a danger. Besides the paid cargo and the food and gear for the men, the camels would also carry a fair amount of fodder for themselves (typically, dried peas when going west, and barley when going east, those being the cheapest types of camel feed in Hohhot and Gucheng, respectively). It was estimated that, when leaving its point of origin, for every 100 loads of merchandise the caravan would carry around 30 loads of fodder. When that was not enough (especially in winter) more fodder could be bought (very expensively) from dealers who would come to the caravan route's popular stopping places from the populated areas of Gansu or Ningxia to the south.

=== Cargo ===
Typical cargo carried by the caravans were commodities such as wool, cotton fabrics, or tea, as well as miscellaneous manufactured goods for sale in Xinjiang and Mongolia. Opium was carried as well, typically by smaller, surreptitious, caravans, usually in winter (since in the hot weather opium would be too easily detected by the smell). More exotic loads could include jade from Khotan, elk antlers prized in Chinese medicine, or even dead bodies of the Shanxi caravan men and traders, who happened to die while in Xinjiang. In the latter case, the bodies had been first "temporarily" buried in Gucheng in light-weight coffins, and when, after three or so years in the grave the flesh had been mostly "consumed away", the merchant guild sent the bodies to the east by a special caravan. Due to the special nature of the load, higher freight rate was charged for such "dead passengers". Camels have been historically used to traffic illicit drugs among their legal trade goods. With camel meat being illegal in some places, camels themselves are smuggled. In India, ritual sacrifice and common slaughter has fueled camel smuggling.

=== Speed ===
According to Lattimore's diary, caravan travel in Inner Mongolia did not always follow a regular schedule. Caravans traveled or camped at any time of day or night, depending on weather, local conditions, and the need for rest. Since the caravan traveled at the walking speed of the men, the distance made in a day (a "stage") was usually between 10 and 25 mi (16 and 40 km), depending on road and weather conditions, and distances between water sources. On occasions several days were spent in a camp without going forward, due to bad weather. A one-way trip from Hohhot to Gucheng (1,550 to 1,650 mi or 2,490 to 2,660 km by Lattimore's reckoning) could take anything from three to eight months.

Smaller caravans owned by Mongols of the Alashan (the westernmost Inner Mongolia) and manned by Han Chinese from Zhenfan, were able to make longer marches (and, thus, cover longer distances faster) than the typical Han Chinese or Hui caravans, because the Mongols were able to always use "fresh" camels (picked from their large herd for just a single journey), every man was provided with a camel to ride, and loads were much lighter than in the "standard" caravans (rarely exceeding 270 pounds (122.5 kg). These caravans would typically travel by day, from sunrise to sunset. Such a camel train is described in the accounts of the journey made by Peter Fleming and Ella Maillart in the Gobi Desert in the mid-1930s.

=== Logistics ===
Inns called caravanserai were spread along the route of a long caravan journey. These roadside inns specialized in catering to travelers along established trade routes, such as the Silk Road and the Royal Road. Because such long trade routes often passed through inhospitable desert regions, journeys would be impossible to complete successfully and profitably without caravanserai to provide necessary supplies and assistance to merchants and travelers.

It was necessary for camels to spend at least two months between long journeys to recuperate, and the best time for that recuperation was in June–July, when camels shed their hair and the grazing is best. Therefore, the best practice was for a caravan to leave Hohhot in August, just after the grazing season; upon reaching Gucheng, weaker camels could stay there until the next summer by grazing whatever vegetation is available in winter, while the stronger ones, after a few weeks of recovery on a grain diet (grain being cheaper in Xinjiang than in eastern China), would be sent back in late winter/early spring, taking along plenty of grain for fodder, and returning to Hohhot before the next grazing season. Vice versa, one could leave Hohhot in the spring, spend the summer grazing season in Xinjiang, and come back in the late fall of the same year. Either way, it would be possible for the caravan people and their best camels to make a full round trip within a year. However, such perfect scheduling was not always possible, and it was often the case that a caravan sent out from Hohhot in August would end up staying on the other end of the route until and through the next grazing season, coming back to Hohhot about a year and a half after its departure.

=== Loss of camels; camel hair trade ===
On almost every journey quite a few camels in each caravan would be lost. On a particularly exhausting section of the trip, an animal already worn out by many weeks of walking, or accidentally poisoned by eating a poisonous plant, would kneel down and not rise anymore. Since killing a camel was considered bad karma by the caravan people, the hopeless animal—whose death, if it was owned by an individual camel-puller, would be a huge material loss for its owner—was simply left behind to die, "thrown on the Gobi" as the camel men would say.

Since camels moult in the summer, camel owners received additional income from collecting several pounds of hair their animals dropped during the summer grazing (and shedding season); in northern China, the camel hair trade started around the 1880s. Later, caravan men learned the art of knitting and crocheting from the defeated White Russians (in exile in Xinjiang after the Russian Civil War) and the items they had made were transported to eastern China by camel caravan. Although the hair shed by the camels or picked from them was of course considered the property of the camel owners, caravan workers were entitled to make use of some hair for making knitwear for themselves (mostly socks) or for sale. Lattimore in 1926 observed camel-pullers "knitting on the march; if they ran out of yarn, they would reach back to the first camel of the file they were leading, pluck a handful of hair from the neck, and roll it in their palms into the beginning of a length of yarn; a weight was attached to this, and given a twist to start it spinning, and the man went on feeding wool into the thread until he had spun enough yarn to continue his knitting".

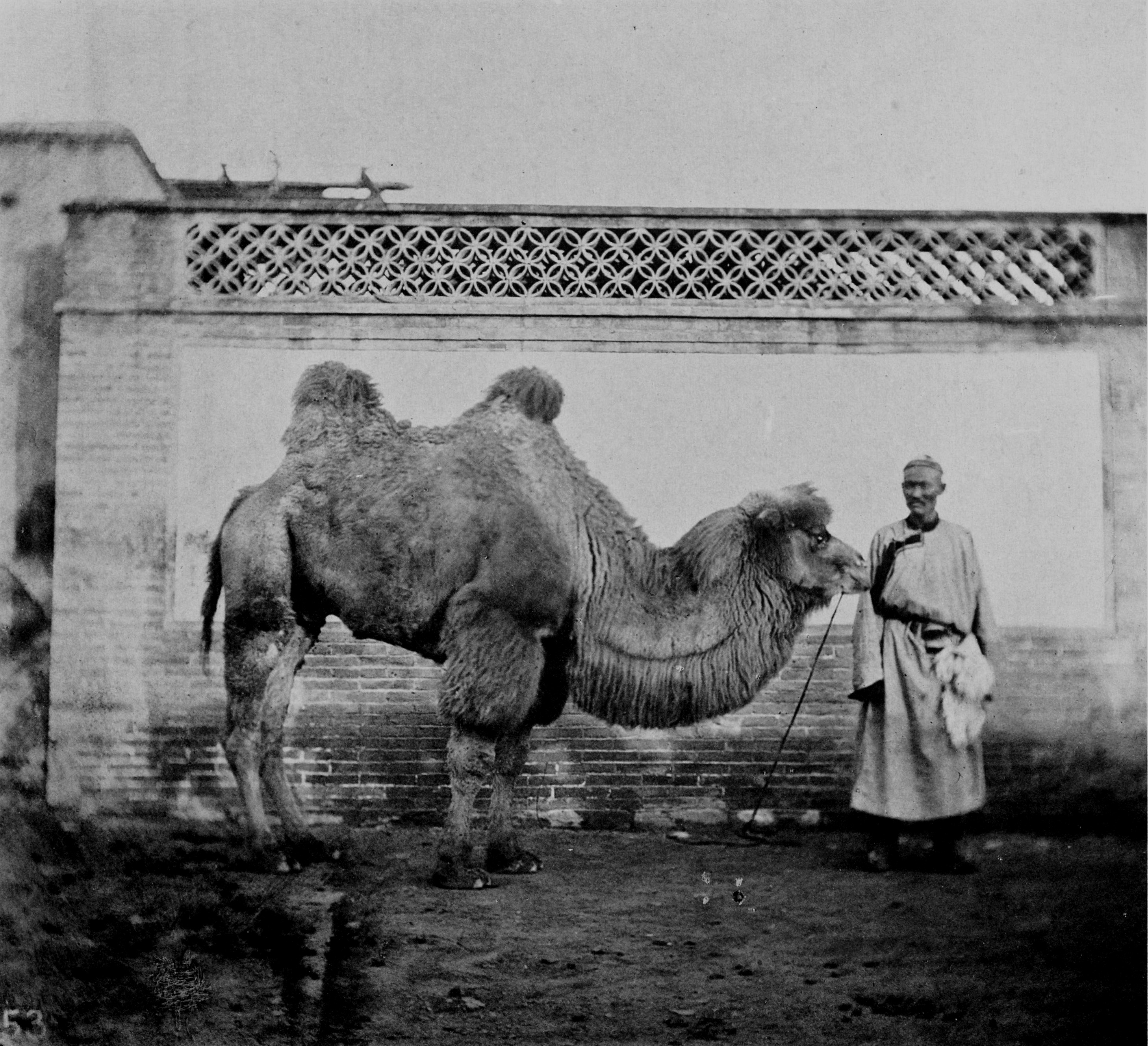
"The Pekingese Camel"; photograph by John Thomson

== Cultural associations ==
"In the Desert" ("Верблюды", literally 'Camels') is a traditional Russian song, performed by Donald Swann. He provides an English-language translation after every line. The song is extremely repetitive ("Another camel is approaching"), rendering the translation largely redundant, "a whole caravan of camels is approaching".

Fritz Mühlenweg wrote a book called In geheimer Mission durch die Wüste Gobi (part one in English Big Tiger and Compass Mountain), published in 1950. It was later shortened and translated into English under the title Big Tiger and Christian; it concerns the adventures of two boys who cross the Gobi Desert.

== See also ==
- Camel cavalry
- Caravan (travellers)
- Caravanserai
- Cariboo camels
- Twenty mule team
