= Water's Bluff, Texas =

Waters Bluff, Texas
- Unincorporated community
- Location within Texas Location within the United States
- Coordinates: 32°30′09″N 95°07′09″W
- Country: United States
- State: Texas
- County: Smith
- Elevation: 374 ft (114 m)
- Time zone: UTC-6 (Central (CST))
  - Summer (DST): UTC-5 (CDT)
- Area codes: 430 & 903
- GNIS feature ID: 1379242

Water's Bluff is an unincorporated community located on Farm Road 757, in northeastern Smith County, Texas, United States.

== History ==
In 1936, an elementary school would be erected in the community, in which it served 64 black students and had 2 teachers, until 1952 where the students would instead attend the Winona Independent School District.

In 1936, maps of that area showed 2 churches, a cemetery, and a few dwellings built along dirt roads. In 1960, maps would identify Water's Bluff as a settlement with around 30 homes, a cemetery, a school building, a business, and 2 churches; one of them being a Seventh-day Adventist church, located in the northeast of the area. A community center for Water's Bluff was then built in 1973.
