= Chapel Hill High School (Tyler, Texas) =

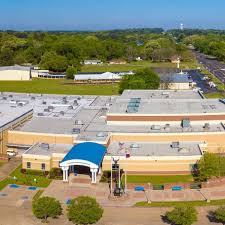

Location
- 13172 St. Hwy. 64E; Tyler, Texas 75707-9702; United States; 32.30951°N 95.18951°W

Information
- Type: Public high school
- Motto: Shaping the Future, One Child at a Time
- Established: 1948
- School district: Chapel Hill Independent School District
- Principal: Matthew Strode
- Grades: 9-12
- Enrollment: 1,036 (2023-2024)
- Colors: Blue and Gold
- Athletics conference: UIL Class AAAA (4A)
- Mascot: Bulldogs
- Rival: Whitehouse
- Website: www.chapelhillisd.org/o/chhs

Chapel Hill High School is a public high school located in Tyler, Texas, United States and classified as a 4A school by the UIL. It is part of the Chapel Hill Independent School District located in southeastern Smith County. In 2018, the school was rated "Met Standard" by the Texas Education Agency.

== Athletics ==
The Chapel Hill Bulldogs compete in the following sports:

- Cross Country
- Volleyball
- Football
- Basketball
- Powerlifting
- Soccer
- Golf
- Tennis
- Track
- Softball
- Baseball
- Cheer
- Drill Team

=== State titles ===
- Football
  - 1989(4A), 2011(3A/D1)

== Theater ==
- State Appearances
  - 2000 (The Foreigner)
  - 2011 (Too Much Memory)
  - 2012 (Enron)

== Clubs and activities ==
- Athletics Booster Club
- BPA
- Crime Stoppers
- DCP
- FCA
- FCCLA
- FFA
- Graphic Arts Club
- International Club
- National Honor Society
- National Technical Honor Society
- Speech and Debate
- Student Senate
- TAFE
- TSA
- UIL Academics
