= Chapel Hill Independent School District (Smith County, Texas) =

School district in Texas

Coordinates: 32.3175°N 95.1880°W

Chapel Hill Independent School District is a public school district based in unincorporated Smith County, Texas (USA), near Tyler. The district is located in east central Smith County and covers the suburb of New Chapel Hill, the community of Jackson, and a small portion of Tyler.

In 2009, the school district was rated "academically acceptable" by the Texas Education Agency.

== Schools ==
- Wise Elementary School (Grades PK-5)
- Jackson Elementary School (Grades PK-5)
- W.L. Kissam Elementary School (4-6)
- Chapel Hill Junior High (Grades 7-8)
- WINGS Alternative School (Grades 6-12)
- Chapel Hill High School (Grades 9-12)
