= Utica, Texas =

- Ghost town
- Location within Texas Location within the United States
- Coordinates: 32°31′02″N 95°16′07″W
- Country: United States
- State: Texas
- County: Smith
- Time zone: UTC-6 (Central (CST))
  - Summer (DST): UTC-5 (CDT)
- Area codes: 430 & 903
- GNIS feature ID: 2033734

Utica is a ghost town in Smith County, located in the U.S. state of Texas.

A postal office opened in 1890, when the population was still estimated 100 people. It was closed only 15 years later in 1905.
