= Thetford (disambiguation) =

Thetford is a market town in the English county of Norfolk.

Thetford may also refer to:

== Places ==
=== Canada ===
- Thetford Mines, Quebec, Canada

=== England ===
- Thetford, Lincolnshire, England
- Thetford, Cambridgeshire, civil parish in Cambridgeshire, England
  - Little Thetford, a village in the parish
- Thetford (UK Parliament constituency), Norfolk

=== United States ===
- Thetford, Vermont, United States
- Thetford Township, Michigan, United States

== See also ==
- Thedford (disambiguation)
