= Blackjack, Smith County, Texas =

Unincorporated community in Smith County, Texas, United States

Blackjack, Texas
- Unincorporated community
- Location within Texas Location within the United States
- Coordinates: 32°12′21″N 95°10′41″W
- Country: United States
- State: Texas
- County: Smith
- Elevation: 367 ft (112 m)
- Time zone: UTC-6 (Central (CST))
  - Summer (DST): UTC-5 (CDT)
- ZIP code: 75789
- Area codes: 430 & 903
- GNIS feature ID: 1378013

Blackjack is an unincorporated community in Smith County, Texas, Texas. The community is located along Farm to Market Road 346.

== See also ==
- List of unincorporated communities in Texas
