= New Chapel Hill, Texas =

- City
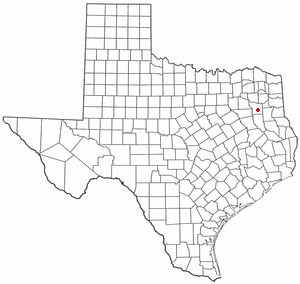
- Location of NewChapelHill, Texas

- Coordinates: 32°18′04″N 95°10′03″W
- Country: United States
- State: Texas
- County: Smith

Area
  - Total: 2.42 sq mi (6.27 km^{2})
  - Land: 2.39 sq mi (6.20 km^{2})
  - Water: 0.027 sq mi (0.07 km^{2})
- Elevation: 423 ft (129 m)

Population (2020)
  - Total: 620
  - Density: 270.0/sq mi (104.23/km^{2})
- Time zone: UTC-6 (Central (CST))
  - Summer (DST): UTC-5 (CDT)
- Zip Code: 75707
- Area codes: 430, 903
- FIPS code: 48-50876
- GNIS feature ID: 2411229

New Chapel Hill is a city in Smith County, Texas, United States. The population was 620 at the 2020 census. It is part of the Tyler, Texas Metropolitan Statistical Area.

== Geography ==
According to the United States Census Bureau, the city has a total area of 2.5 square miles (6.4 km^{2}), all land.

== Demographics ==
Historical population
Census	Pop.	Note	%±
1980	618		—
1990	439		−29.0%
2000	553		26.0%
2010	594		7.4%
2020	620		4.4%
U.S. Decennial Census

=== 2020 census ===
As of the 2020 census, New Chapel Hill had a population of 620. The median age was 38.9 years. 23.5% of residents were under the age of 18 and 19.2% of residents were 65 years of age or older. For every 100 females there were 92.5 males, and for every 100 females age 18 and over there were 88.8 males age 18 and over.

0.0% of residents lived in urban areas, while 100.0% lived in rural areas.

There were 230 households in New Chapel Hill, of which 40.0% had children under the age of 18 living in them. Of all households, 55.2% were married-couple households, 16.5% were households with a male householder and no spouse or partner present, and 21.7% were households with a female householder and no spouse or partner present. About 20.4% of all households were made up of individuals and 10.4% had someone living alone who was 65 years of age or older.

There were 261 housing units, of which 11.9% were vacant. The homeowner vacancy rate was 0.0% and the rental vacancy rate was 12.3%.

Racial composition as of the 2020 census
Race	Number	Percent
White	503	81.1%
Black or African American	18	2.9%
American Indian and Alaska Native	8	1.3%
Asian	1	0.2%
Native Hawaiian and Other Pacific Islander	1	0.2%
Some other race	28	4.5%
Two or more races	61	9.8%
Hispanic or Latino (of any race)	90	14.5%

=== 2000 census ===
As of the 2000 census, there were 553 people, 205 households, and 157 families residing in the city. The population density was 225.2 inhabitants per square mile (87.0/km^{2}). There were 221 housing units at an average density of 90.0 per square mile (34.7/km^{2}). The racial makeup of the city was 97.83% White, 0.90% African American, 0.36% Native American, 0.54% Asian, 0.36% from other races. Hispanic or Latino of any race were 2.35% of the population.

There were 205 households, out of which 37.6% had children under the age of 18 living with them, 64.9% were married couples living together, 8.3% had a female householder with no husband present, and 23.4% were non-families. 19.0% of all households were made up of individuals, and 8.3% had someone living alone who was 65 years of age or older. The average household size was 2.70 and the average family size was 3.11.

In the city, the population was spread out, with 27.3% under the age of 18, 11.6% from 18 to 24, 29.8% from 25 to 44, 19.9% from 45 to 64, and 11.4% who were 65 years of age or older. The median age was 33 years. For every 100 females, there were 107.1 males. For every 100 females age 18 and over, there were 103.0 males.

The median income for a household in the city was $42,763, and the median income for a family was $47,000. Males had a median income of $28,000 versus $26,875 for females. The per capita income for the city was $16,869. None of the families and 2.6% of the population were living below the poverty line, including no under eighteens and 12.7% of those over 64.

== Education ==
The City of New Chapel Hill is served by the Chapel Hill Independent School District.
