= New Hope, Smith County, Texas =

New Hope
- Unincorporated community
- Location within the state of Texas New Hope (the United States)
- Coordinates: 32°10′17″N 95°18′53″W
- Country: United States
- State: Texas
- County: Smith
- Time zone: UTC-6 (Central (CST))
  - Summer (DST): UTC-5 (CDT)

New Hope is an unincorporated community in Smith County, Texas, United States. It is part of the Tyler, Texas Metropolitan Statistical Area.
