= Mount Sylvan, Texas =

- Unincorporated community
- Location within Texas Location within the United States
- Coordinates: 32°27′27″N 95°28′08″W
- Country: United States
- State: Texas
- County: Smith
- Elevation: 538 ft (164 m)
- Time zone: UTC-6 (Central (CST))
  - Summer (DST): UTC-5 (CDT)
- Area codes: 430 & 903
- GNIS feature ID: 1342119

Mount Sylvan is an unincorporated community in Smith County, located in the U.S. state of Texas.

== History ==
The settlement was founded in 1852 on a local trade route, the Tyler-Garden Valley Road (now TX state highway 110). And in 1858 the post office was established
