= Douglas, Texas =

- Ghost town
- Location within Texas Location within the United States
- Coordinates: 32°21′04″N 95°04′06″W
- Country: United States
- State: Texas
- County: Smith
- Elevation: 469 ft (143 m)
- Time zone: UTC-6 (Central (CST))
  - Summer (DST): UTC-5 (CDT)
- Area codes: 430 & 903
- GNIS feature ID: 1378221

Douglas is an abandoned town in eastern Smith County, located in the U.S. state of Texas. , near the old Jamestown-Tyler road. In 1936, the town had one dwelling and four buildings which were part of a school for black students, as well as a cemetery and farms. The school was later incorporated into the Arp Independent School District, and Douglas was essentially abandoned by the 1970s.
