= Bostick, Texas =

Unincorporated community in Smith County, Texas, United States

- Unincorporated community
- Location within Texas Location within the United States
- Coordinates: 32°23′15″N 95°16′20″W
- Country: United States
- State: Texas
- County: Smith
- Elevation: 499 ft (152 m)
- Time zone: UTC-6 (Central (CST))
  - Summer (DST): UTC-5 (CDT)
- ZIP Code: 75708
- Area codes: 430 & 903
- GNIS feature ID: 1331102

Bostick is an unincorporated community in Smith County, Texas, United States.

== Description ==
The community is located along U.S. Route 271 / Texas State Highway 155 and Texas State Highway Loop 323; and has partially been included within the northeastern most city limits of Tyler.

== See also ==
- List of unincorporated communities in Texas
