= Copeland, Texas =

- Unincorporated community
- Location within Texas Location within the United States
- Country: United States
- State: Texas
- County: Smith

Copeland is an unincorporated community in Smith County, located in the U.S. state of Texas.
