= Emerald Bay, Texas =

Census-designated place in Smith County, Texas, United States

- Census-designated place
- Location within Texas
- Coordinates: 32°09′37″N 95°26′17″W
- Country: United States
- State: Texas
- County: Smith

Area
  - Total: 1.5 sq mi (3.9 km^{2})
  - Land: 0.75 sq mi (1.9 km^{2})
  - Water: 0.75 sq mi (1.9 km^{2})
- Elevation: 361 ft (110 m)

Population (2020)
  - Total: 1,146
  - Density: 1,500/sq mi (590/km^{2})
- Time zone: UTC-6 (Central (CST))
  - Summer (DST): UTC-5 (CDT)
- Zip Code: 75757
- Area codes: 430, 903
- GNIS feature ID: 2586927

Emerald Bay is a census-designated place (CDP) in Smith County, Texas, United States. It is located on the eastern side of Lake Palestine, near Bullard. It is a census-designated place (CDP) created for the 2010 census. Emerald Bay had a population of 1,146 as of the 2020 census.

== Demographics ==
Historical population
Census	Pop.	Note	%±
2010	1,047		—
2020	1,146		9.5%
U.S. Decennial Census; 1850–1900 1910; 1920 1930 1940; 1950 1960 1970; 1980 1990 2000; 2010 2020

Emerald Bay first appeared as a census designated place in the 2010 U.S. census.

=== 2020 census ===
Emerald Bay CDP, Texas – Racial and ethnic composition Note: the US Census treats Hispanic/Latino as an ethnic category. This table excludes Latinos from the racial categories and assigns them to a separate category. Hispanics/Latinos may be of any race.
Race / Ethnicity (NH = Non-Hispanic)	Pop 2010	Pop 2020	% 2010	% 2020
White alone (NH)	1,023	1,082	97.71%	94.42%
Black or African American alone (NH)	3	9	0.29%	0.79%
Native American or Alaska Native alone (NH)	2	5	0.19%	0.44%
Asian alone (NH)	11	12	1.05%	1.05%
Native Hawaiian or Pacific Islander alone (NH)	0	0	0.00%	0.00%
Other race alone (NH)	0	0	0.00%	0.00%
Mixed race or Multiracial (NH)	2	24	0.19%	2.09%
Hispanic or Latino (any race)	6	14	0.57%	1.22%
Total	1,047	1,146	100.00%	100.00%

As of the 2020 United States census, there were 1,146 people, 442 households, and 361 families residing in the CDP.

== See also ==
- List of census-designated places in Texas
