= Carroll, Texas =

Unincorporated community in Smith County, Texas, United States

- Unincorporated community
- Location within Texas Location within the United States
- Coordinates: 32°28′39″N 95°31′13″W
- Country: United States
- State: Texas
- County: Smith
- Elevation: 532 ft (162 m)
- Time zone: UTC-6 (Central (CST))
  - Summer (DST): UTC-5 (CDT)
- Area codes: 430 & 903
- GNIS feature ID: 1353873

Carroll is an unincorporated community in Smith County, Texas, United States.

== Description ==
The community is located along Interstate 20, Texas State Highway 110, and the east end of Farm to Market Road 1995. It was originally settled in 1890 and had a population of 125 by 1892. The latest data shows 60 residents as of 2000.

== See also ==
- List of unincorporated communities in Texas
