= Bascom, Texas =

Unincorporated community in Texas, US

- Unincorporated community
- Location within Texas Location within the United States
- Coordinates: 32°19′23″N 95°13′03″W
- Country: United States
- State: Texas
- County: Smith
- Elevation: 571 ft (174 m)
- Time zone: UTC-6 (Central (CST))
  - Summer (DST): UTC-5 (CDT)
- Area codes: 430 & 903
- GNIS feature ID: 1330118

Bascom is an unincorporated community in Smith County, located in the U.S. state of Texas, settled in 1846 on the site of an Indian encampment and flowing spring. The community was named after the Christian preacher and circuit rider Henry Bidleman Bascom. Country music musician Johnny Gimble was raised here.
