= Thedford, Texas =

- Unincorporated community
- Location within Texas Location within the United States
- Coordinates: 32°29′05″N 95°23′48″W
- Country: United States
- State: Texas
- County: Smith
- Elevation: 512 ft (156 m)
- Time zone: UTC-6 (Central (CST))
  - Summer (DST): UTC-5 (CDT)
- Area codes: 430 & 903
- GNIS feature ID: 1348465

Thedford is an unincorporated community in Smith County, Texas, United States. Its area is small and undefined, having no formal or agreed-upon boundaries. The community's population is also small and relatively sparse.

For all intents and purposes, Thedford is part of Lindale and is often considered one of Lindale's neighborhoods. People living in the area are more accurately described as residents of Lindale, as the Thedford community is almost completely engulfed by Lindale, with which it shares a postal ZIP code, post office, fire–rescue services, and other services and utilities. The entire Thedford community is served by the Lindale Independent School District.
