= Sand Flat, Smith County, Texas =

Sand Flat, Texas
- Unincorporated community
- Location within Texas Location within the United States
- Coordinates: 32°29′15″N 95°16′51″W
- Country: United States
- State: Texas
- County: Smith
- Elevation: 617 ft (188 m)
- Time zone: UTC-6 (Central (CST))
  - Summer (DST): UTC-5 (CDT)
- Area codes: 430 & 903
- GNIS feature ID: 2034674

Sand Flat is an unincorporated community in Smith County, located in the U.S. state of Texas.
