= Pine Springs, Smith County, Texas =

Unincorporated community in Smith County, Texas, United States

Pine Springs, Texas
- Unincorporated community
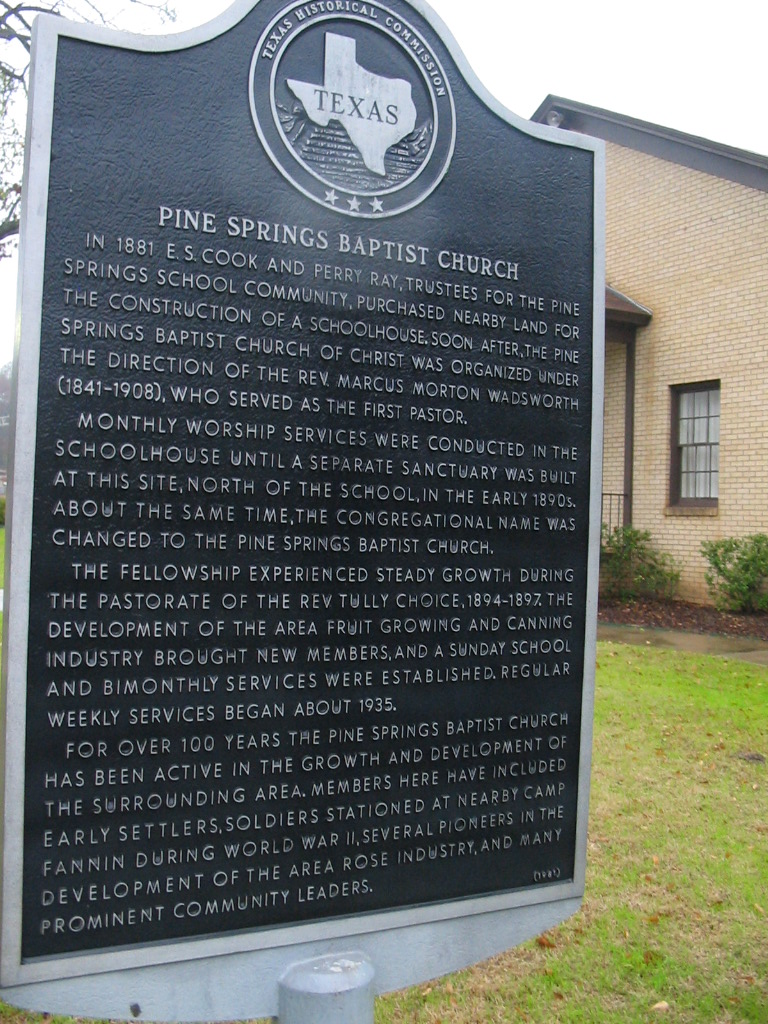
- Interactive map of Pine Springs, Texas
- Coordinates: 32.398°N 95.267°W
- Country: United States
- State: Texas
- County: Smith
- Elevation: 486 ft (148 m)

Population (2000)
  - Total: 150
- Time zone: UTC-6 (Central (CST))
  - Summer (DST): UTC-5 (CDT)
- ZIP code: 75706
- Area code: 903
- GNIS feature ID: 1344073

Pine Springs is an unincorporated community (also called Fruit) in Smith County, Texas, United States. In 2000, the population was 150 residents.

== Description ==
The community is located along U.S. Route 271 / Texas State Highway 155 and has partially been included within the northeastern most city limits of Tyler.

== History ==
The earliest settlers, including the Shamburger family, arrived in the 1840s. In 1881, E. S. Cook and Perry Ray purchased land as trustees for the Pine Springs Community. A building constructed that year was used for both a school and church. The church members built their own Pine Springs Baptist Church early in the 1890s. John Demas Ray named the settlement for the large spring located in pines near the school. Orchard produce was the livelihood for most farmers in the area, and in 1891 the Smith County Canning Company built a factory in the area. In 1894 a post office, called Fruit, opened with Thomas A. Shamburger as postmaster. A series of misfortunes hit the local orchards, and most businesses and many residents left the area. In 1900 the post office moved to Tyler.

After the canning factory closed, the fruit growers of Pine Springs began raising roses, and several members of the community were pioneers in the Tyler rose industry. School records for 1903 showed two schools, one with three teachers and 139 white students and another with one teacher and fifty-three black students. In 1936, the community had the church, a cemetery, a school, one business, and a small cluster of dwellings. That year, the four-teacher school held classes for 128 white pupils. By 1952, the schools in the area had been consolidated into the Pine Springs ISD, which was absorbed by the Tyler Independent School District in 1956. After 1963, the original school building was reopened as the Pine Springs Community Center. In 1966, the community had a school, a church, a cemetery, a roadside park, scattered homes, and a residential area. Maps for 1981 showed approximately ten businesses on Highway 271 and a church, a cemetery, and a community center north of the highway on Ray's Creek.

== See also ==
- List of unincorporated communities in Texas
