= Winona, Texas =

City in Smith County, Texas, United States

- City
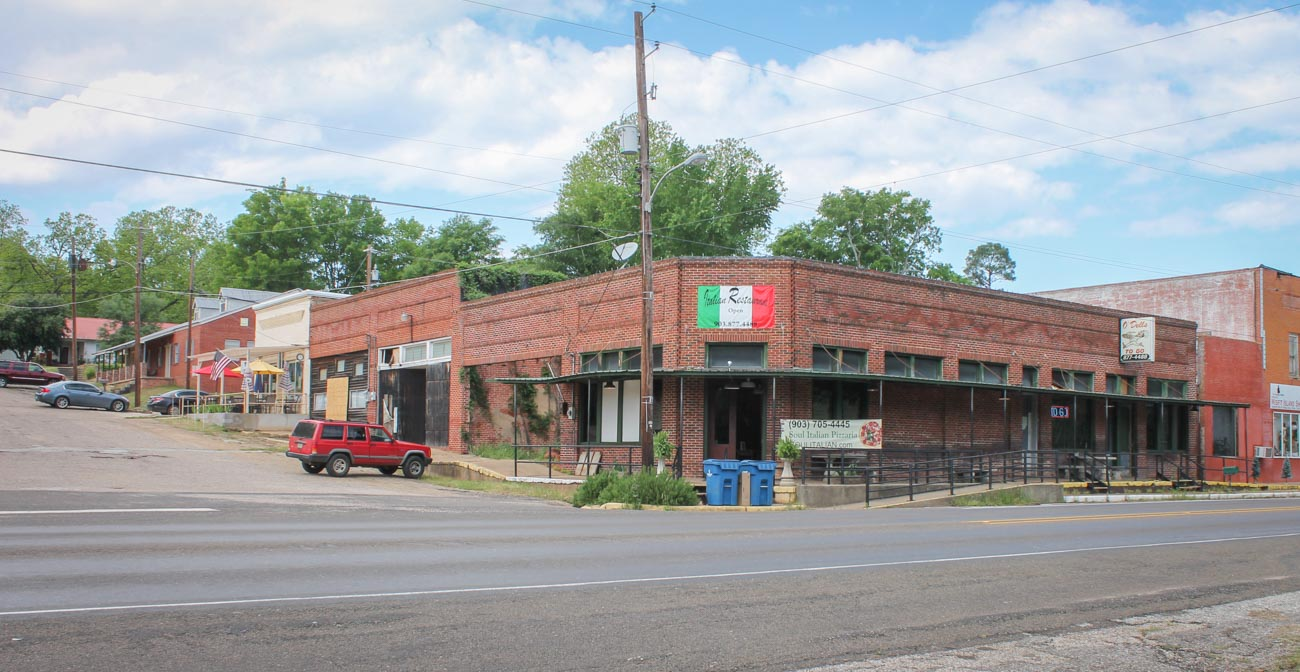
- Winona, Texas
- Motto: "Working for Your Future"
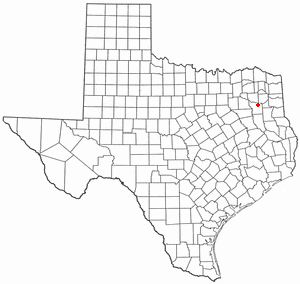
- Location of Winona, Texas

- Coordinates: 32°29′47″N 95°10′19″W
- Country: United States
- State: Texas
- County: Smith

Area
  - Total: 1.56 sq mi (4.03 km^{2})
  - Land: 1.54 sq mi (3.99 km^{2})
  - Water: 0.015 sq mi (0.04 km^{2})
- Elevation: 433 ft (132 m)

Population (2020)
  - Total: 623
  - Density: 404/sq mi (156/km^{2})
- Time zone: UTC-6 (Central (CST))
  - Summer (DST): UTC-5 (CDT)
- ZIP code: 75792
- Area codes: 430, 903
- FIPS code: 48-79828
- GNIS feature ID: 2413501
- Website: City of Winona, Texas

Winona is a city in Smith County, Texas, United States. Founded in 1870, its population was 623 at the 2020 U.S. census, up from 576 in 2010. It is part of the Tyler metropolitan statistical area.

== Geography ==
Winona is located at 32°29′27″N 95°10′16″W (32.490836, –95.171100). According to the United States Census Bureau, the town has a total area of 1.6 square miles (4.0 km^{2}), all land.

== Demographics ==
Winona racial composition as of 2020 (NH = Non-Hispanic) (Note: Note: the US Census treats Hispanic/Latino as an ethnic category. This table excludes Latinos from the racial categories and assigns them to a separate category. Hispanics/Latinos can be of any race.)
Race	Number	Percentage
White (NH)	439	70.47%
Black or African American (NH)	67	10.75%
Native American or Alaska Native (NH)	1	0.16%
Asian (NH)	3	0.48%
Mixed/Multi-Racial (NH)	38	6.1%
Hispanic or Latino	75	12.04%
Total	623	

As of the 2020 United States census, there were 623 people, 203 households, and 158 families residing in the town.

== Education ==
The city of Winona is served by the Winona Independent School District.

== See also ==
- List of municipalities in Texas
