= Shady Grove, Smith County, Texas =

Shady Grove, Texas
- Unincorporated community
- Location within Texas Location within the United States
- Coordinates: 32°26′31″N 95°16′56″W
- Country: United States
- State: Texas
- County: Smith
- Elevation: 505 ft (154 m)
- Time zone: UTC-6 (Central (CST))
  - Summer (DST): UTC-5 (CDT)
- Area codes: 430 & 903
- GNIS feature ID: 1346928

Shady Grove is an unincorporated community in Smith County, located in the U.S. state of Texas.
