= Teaselville, Texas =

- Unincorporated community
- Location within Texas Location within the United States
- Coordinates: 32°08′53″N 95°24′17″W
- Country: United States
- State: Texas
- County: Smith
- Elevation: 417 ft (127 m)

Population (2000)
  - Total: 150
- Time zone: UTC-6 (Central (CST))
  - Summer (DST): UTC-5 (CDT)
- Area codes: 430 & 903
- GNIS feature ID: 1379141

Teaselville, also known as Loftin, is an unincorporated community in Smith County, Texas, United States. Teaselville is located at the junction of Farm to Market Road 344 and Farm to Market Road 346, 4 miles (6.4 km) west of Bullard.

== History ==
Teaselville was inhabited by 1846, and the community was formed in 1850. A post office opened in Teaselville in 1900 and closed by 1936. The population of Teaselville was 150 in 2000.

Currently, the community consists of a coffee shop, a Family Dollar, and a Dollar General.
