= Gresham, Texas =

- Unincorporated community
- Location within Texas Location within the United States
- Coordinates: 32°13′46″N 95°20′58″W
- Country: United States
- State: Texas
- County: Smith
- Elevation: 486 ft (148 m)
- Time zone: UTC-6 (Central (CST))
  - Summer (DST): UTC-5 (CDT)
- Area codes: 430 & 903
- GNIS feature ID: 1378384

Gresham is an unincorporated community in Smith County, located in the U.S. state of Texas.

== History ==
In 1877, the community was established as a shipping point on a railroad.
