= Starrville, Texas =

Unincorporated community in Smith County, Texas, United States

- Unincorporated community
- Location within Texas Location within the United States
- Coordinates: 32°28′12″N 95°06′58″W
- Country: United States
- State: Texas
- County: Smith
- Elevation: 394 ft (120 m)
- Time zone: UTC-6 (Central (CST))
  - Summer (DST): UTC-5 (CDT)
- Area codes: 430 & 903
- GNIS feature ID: 1377942

Starrville is an unincorporated community in Smith County, Texas, United States.

== History ==
By 1849, the community had started and it had become a stop on the Dallas-Shreveport Road, an early stage and trade route. In 1892 the population was 200 and it had a gristmill, a flour mill, two cotton gins, a blacksmith shop, a sawmill, and one general store. Around 1936, maps identified a church, a cemetery, one business, two schools, and a large cluster of dwellings. By 1966, maps showed a church and ten dwellings. By the start of the 21st century the population was around 75 people.

== See also ==
- List of unincorporated communities in Texas
