= Winona Independent School District =

School district in Texas, United States

Winona Independent School District is a school district based in Winona, Texas (USA) and covering all of the city of Winona as well as the communities of Red Springs, Sand Flat, Starrville, and East Texas Center (Owentown).

For the 2023-2024 school year, the district had 1,153 students enrolled.

== Academic achievement ==
In 2009, the school district was rated "academically acceptable" by the Texas Education Agency. The rankings of the individual schools are broken down as follows:

- Exemplary: 0
- Recognized: 2
- Academically Acceptable: 2
- Academically Unacceptable: 0

== District Facts ==
- Ethnic composition: African American - 21%; Hispanic - 38%; White - 35%
- 2004 Tax rate: $1.57 per $100 of property valuation
- Total taxable value: $200,142,244

== Schools ==
=== High schools ===
- Winona High School

=== Middle schools ===
- Winona Middle School

The Winona high school is new and improved.

== Controversy ==
In July 2024, the ACLU of Texas sent Winona Independent School District a letter, alleging that the district's 2023-2024 dress and grooming code appeared to violate the Texas CROWN Act, a state law which prohibits racial discrimination based on hair texture or styles, and asking the district to revise its policies for the 2024-2025 school year.

== See also ==
- List of school districts in Texas
