= Owentown, Texas =

Unincorporated community in Smith County, Texas, United States

- Unincorporated community
- Location within Texas Location within the United States
- Coordinates: 32°26′09″N 95°11′45″W
- Country: United States
- State: Texas
- County: Smith
- Elevation: 390 ft (120 m)
- Time zone: UTC-6 (Central (CST))
  - Summer (DST): UTC-5 (CDT)
- ZIP Code: 75708
- Area codes: 430 & 903
- GNIS feature ID: 1343379

Owentown is an unincorporated community in Smith County, located in the U.S. state of Texas.

== Description ==
The community is located along U.S. Route 271 and Texas State Highway 155; and has partially been included within the northeastern most city limits of Tyler. The Health Science Center at UT Tyler is located on the southwestern edge of the community.

== History ==
The former Camp Fannin area was purchased by the Owen Development Company and became known as Owentown. Five 1958 aerial photographs are in the Cotton Belt Public Relations photos showing Owentown.

== See also ==
- List of unincorporated communities in Texas
