= Smith County, Texas =

County in Texas, United States

- County
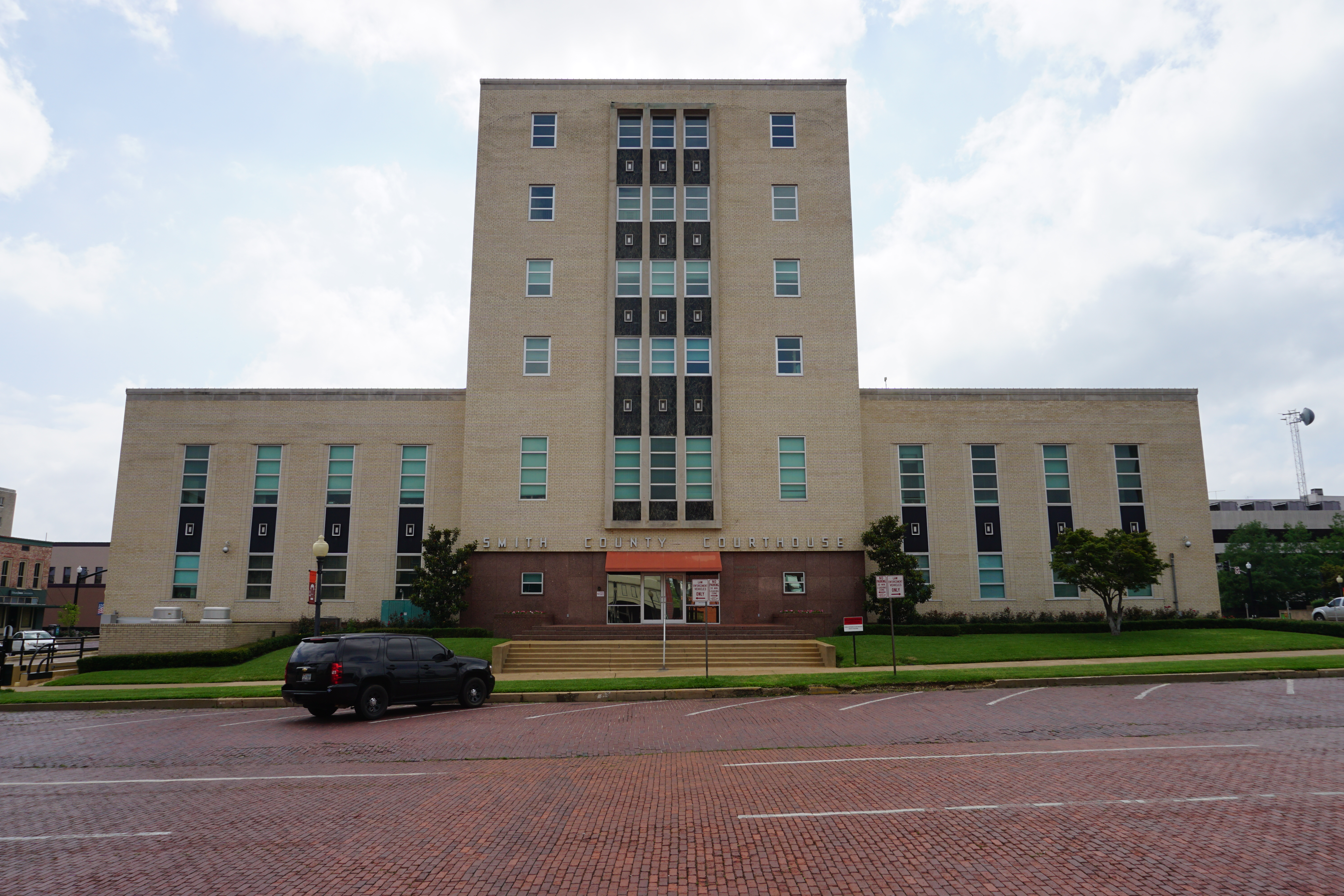
- Smith County Courthouse in Tyler

- Seal

- Location within the U.S. state of Texas
- Coordinates: 32°23′N 95°16′W
- Country: United States
- State: Texas
- Founded: July 1846
- Seat: Tyler
- Largest city: Tyler

Area
  - Total: 950 sq mi (2,500 km^{2})
  - Land: 921 sq mi (2,390 km^{2})
  - Water: 28 sq mi (73 km^{2}) 3.0%

Population (2020)
  - Total: 233,479
  - Estimate (2025): 252,549 ▲
  - Density: 254/sq mi (97.9/km^{2})
- Time zone: UTC−6 (Central)
  - Summer (DST): UTC−5 (CDT)
- Congressional district: 1st
- Website: www.smith-county.com

Smith County is a county in the U.S. state of Texas. As of the 2020 census, its population was 233,479. Its county seat is Tyler. Smith County is named for James Smith, a general during the Texas Revolution. Smith County is part of the Tyler metropolitan statistical area and the Tyler–Jacksonville combined statistical area.

== History ==
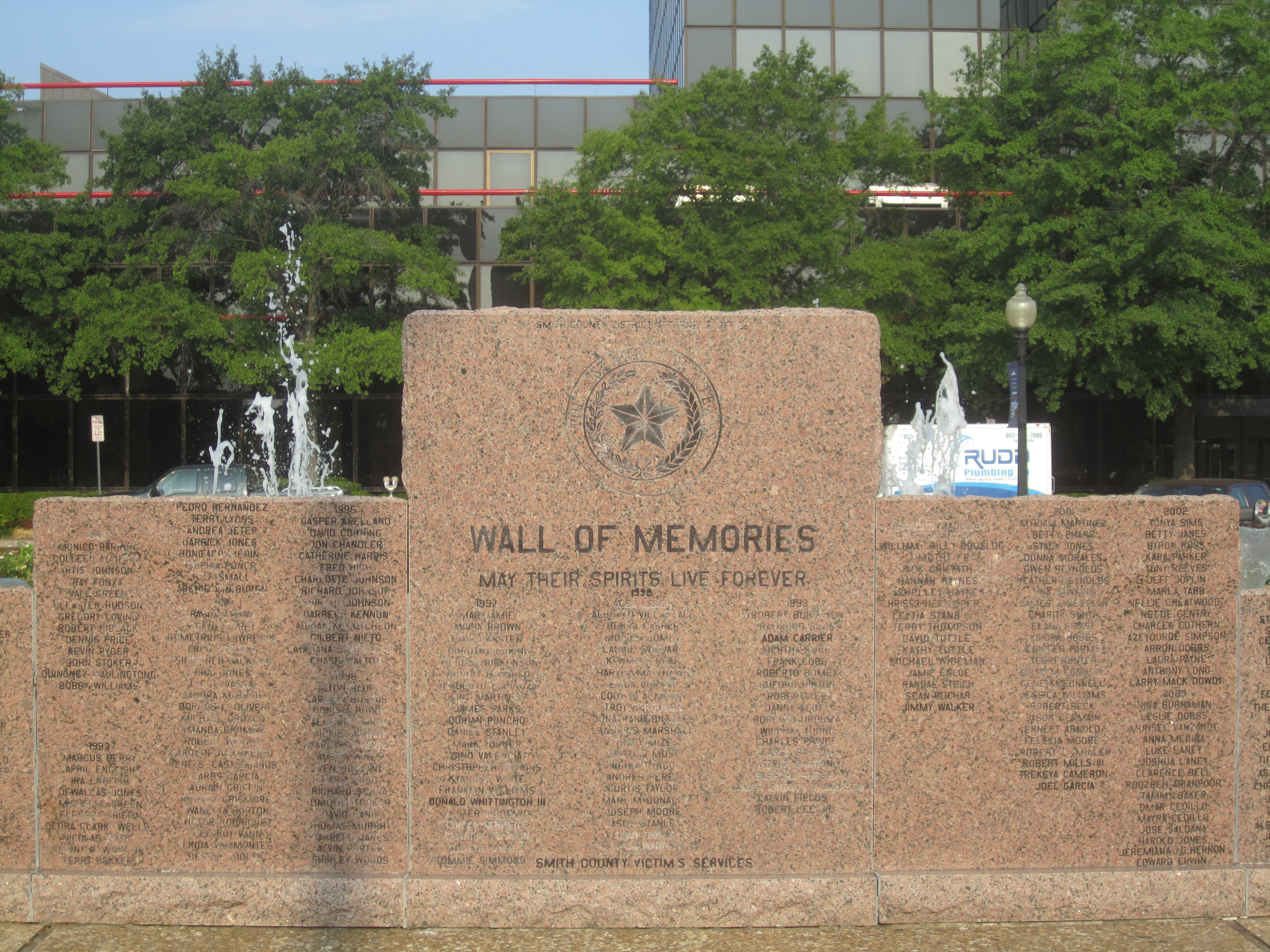
Smith County veterans display, the Wall of Memories, in Tyler Plaza

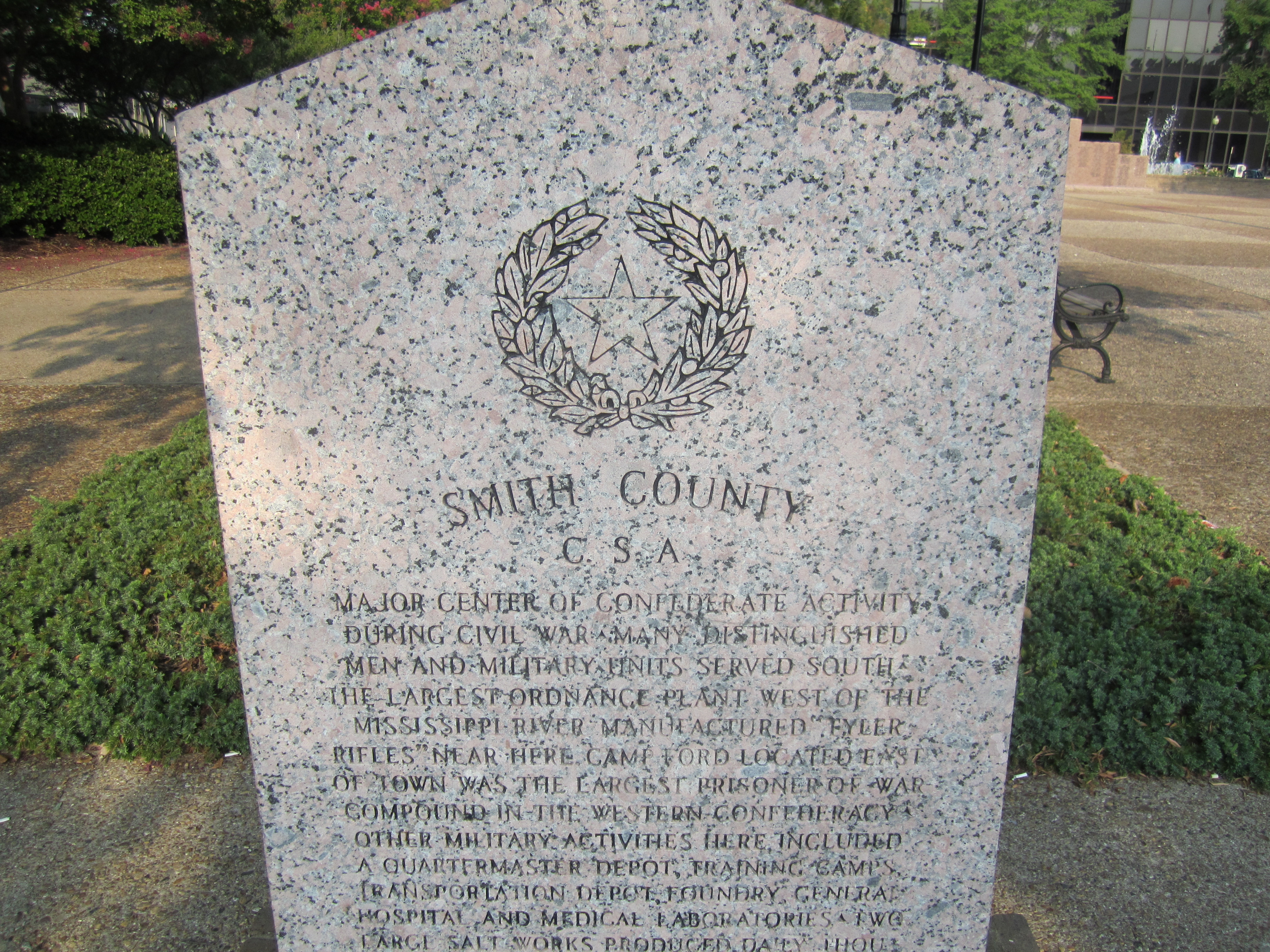
Confederate States of America memorial in Tyler Plaza

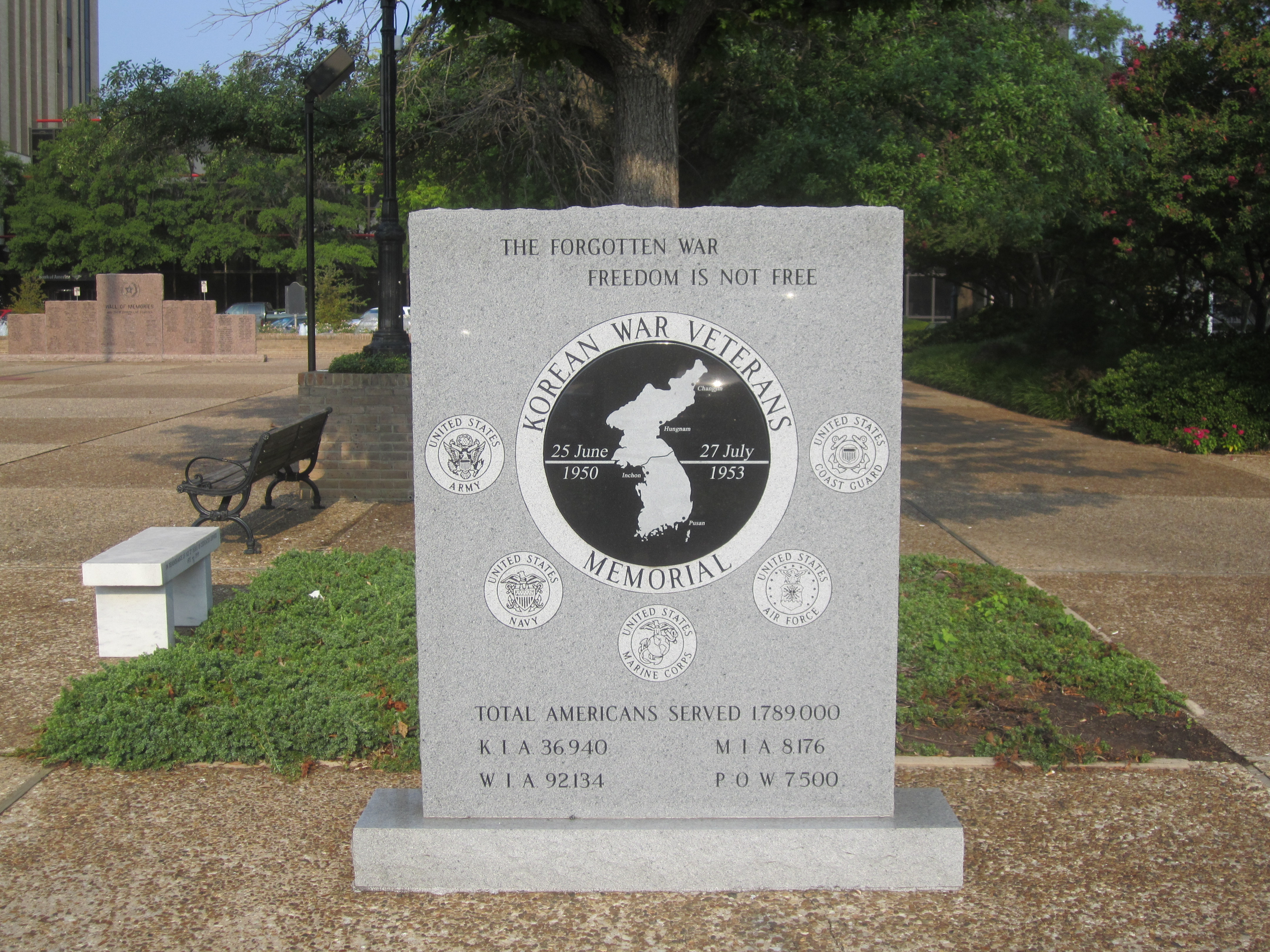
Korean War Memorial in Tyler Plaza

For thousands of years, indigenous peoples occupied this area of present-day Texas. The first known inhabitants of the area now known as Smith County were the Caddo Indians, who were recorded here until 1819. That year, a band of Cherokee, led by their chief, "The Bowl" (also known as Chief Bowles), migrated from Georgia and settled in what are now Smith and Rusk counties. The Treaty of Bowles Village on February 23, 1836, between the Republic of Texas and the Cherokee and 12 affiliated tribes, gave all of Smith and Cherokee counties, as well as parts of western Rusk County, southern Gregg (formed from Rusk County in 1873) and southeastern Van Zandt counties to the tribes.

Native Americans remained on these lands until the Cherokee War in the summer of 1839, as part of European-American conflicts with Native Americans in Texas. The Cherokee were driven out of Smith County. In this period, Cherokee and other Native American nations were forced from the Southeast United States to west of the Mississippi River to Indian Territory during Indian Removal.

After 1845, some Cherokee returned when Benjamin Franklin Thompson, a white man married to a Cherokee, purchased 10,000 acres of land in Rusk County and allowed them to settle. The Mount Tabor Indian Community developed here, some six miles south of present-day Kilgore. The community later grew and incorporated areas near Overton, Arp, and Troup, Texas.

In July 1846, Smith County separated from the Nacogdoches District and was named for James Smith, a general of the Texas Revolution. At this time, Tyler was designated as the county seat.

During the American Civil War, Camp Ford was the largest Confederate prisoner-of-war camp west of the Mississippi River. Here, Sheriff Jim Reed of Collin County and Judge McReynolds, former chief justice of the district, were seized and lynched by "Regulators".

The original site of the camp stockade is now a public historic park owned by Smith County, as such it is exempted from making any County property tax contribution, and is managed by the Smith County Historical Society. The park contains a kiosk, a paved trail, interpretive signage, a cabin reconstruction, and a picnic area. To date, it has never been the site of a paid venue, nor public event. It is located on Highway 271, 0.8 miles north of Loop 323.

=== 20th century to present ===
Camp Fanin, a World War II US army replacement training facility, was located in the area known as Owentown, northeast of Tyler along US Hwy 271. Many of its original buildings still exist.

The Smith County Historical Society, a 501(c)(3) nonprofit organization, was founded in 1959 by individuals and business firms dedicated to discovering, collecting, and preserving data, records, and other items relating to the history of Smith County. More information can be found at the Smith County Historical Society Website.

== Geography ==
According to the U.S. Census Bureau, the county has a total area of 950 square miles (2,500 km^{2}), of which 921 square miles (2,390 km^{2}) are land and 28 square miles (73 km^{2}) (3.0%) are covered by water.

The county infrastructure includes some 1,180 miles (1,900 km) of two-lane county road.

=== Major highways ===
- Interstate 20
- U.S. Highway 69
- U.S. Highway 80
- U.S. Highway 271
- State Highway 31
- State Highway 57
- State Highway 64
- State Highway 110
- State Highway 135
- State Highway 155
- Loop 49
- Loop 124
- Loop 235
- Loop 323
- Spur 80
- Spur 147
- Spur 164
- Spur 248
- Spur 364
- Spur 514

=== Adjacent counties ===
- Wood County (north)
- Upshur County (northeast)
- Gregg County (east)
- Rusk County (southeast)
- Cherokee County (south)
- Henderson County (southwest)
- Van Zandt County (northwest)

=== Communities ===
==== Cities ====
- Arp
- Hideaway
- Lindale
- New Chapel Hill
- Noonday
- Overton (mostly in Rusk County)
- Troup (small part in Cherokee County)
- Tyler (county seat)
- Whitehouse

==== Towns ====
- Bullard (small part in Cherokee County)
- Winona

==== Census-designated place ====
- Emerald Bay

==== Unincorporated communities ====
- Antioch
- Bascom
- Blackjack
- Bostick
- Browning
- Carroll
- Copeland
- Dogwood City
- Elberta
- Flint
- Garden Valley
- Gresham
- Jamestown
- Lee Spring
- Midway
- Mount Sylvan
- New Harmony
- New Hope
- Omen
- Owentown
- Pine Springs
- Pine Trail Estates
- Red Springs
- Salem
- Sand Flat
- Shady Grove
- Sinclair City
- Starrville
- Swan
- Teaselville
- Thedford
- Walnut Grove
- Waters Bluff
- Wood Springs
- Wright City

==== Ghost towns ====
- Burning Bush
- Douglas
- Utica

== Demographics ==
Historical population
Census	Pop.	Note	%±
1850	4,292		—
1860	13,392		212.0%
1870	16,532		23.4%
1880	21,863		32.2%
1890	28,324		29.6%
1900	37,370		31.9%
1910	41,746		11.7%
1920	46,769		12.0%
1930	53,123		13.6%
1940	69,090		30.1%
1950	74,701		8.1%
1960	86,350		15.6%
1970	97,096		12.4%
1980	128,366		32.2%
1990	151,309		17.9%
2000	174,706		15.5%
2010	209,714		20.0%
2020	233,479		11.3%
2025 (est.)	252,549	▲	8.2%
U.S. Decennial Census; 1850–2010 2010 2020

=== Racial and ethnic composition ===
Smith County, Texas – Racial and ethnic composition Note: the US Census treats Hispanic/Latino as an ethnic category. This table excludes Latinos from the racial categories and assigns them to a separate category. Hispanics/Latinos may be of any race.
Race / Ethnicity (NH = Non-Hispanic)	Pop 1980	Pop 1990	Pop 2000	Pop 2010	Pop 2020	% 1980	% 1990	% 2000	% 2010	% 2020
White alone (NH)	95,585	109,853	118,598	130,246	134,452	74.46%	72.60%	67.88%	62.11%	57.59%
Black or African American alone (NH)	28,059	31,289	33,129	37,195	38,003	21.86%	20.68%	18.96%	17.74%	16.28%
Native American or Alaska Native alone (NH)	233	478	562	734	746	0.18%	0.32%	0.32%	0.35%	0.32%
Asian alone (NH)	353	623	1,201	2,550	4,129	0.27%	0.41%	0.69%	1.22%	1.77%
Native Hawaiian or Pacific Islander alone (NH)	x	x	29	63	77	x	x	0.02%	0.03%	0.03%
Other race alone (NH)	99	80	119	225	695	0.08%	0.05%	0.07%	0.11%	0.30%
Mixed race or Multiracial (NH)	x	x	1,547	2,613	8,096	x	x	0.89%	1.25%	3.47%
Hispanic or Latino (any race)	4,037	8,986	19,521	36,088	47,281	3.14%	5.94%	11.17%	17.21%	20.25%
Total	128,366	151,309	174,706	209,714	233,479	100.00%	100.00%	100.00%	100.00%	100.00%

=== 2020 census ===
As of the 2020 census, the county had a population of 233,479. The median age was 37.5 years, with 24.0% of residents under the age of 18 and 17.9% aged 65 or older. For every 100 females there were 92.7 males, and for every 100 females age 18 and over there were 89.4 males age 18 and over.

As of the 2020 census, the racial makeup of the county was 61.9% White, 16.5% Black or African American, 0.7% American Indian and Alaska Native, 1.8% Asian, <0.1% Native Hawaiian and Pacific Islander, 9.4% from some other race, and 9.6% from two or more races; Hispanic or Latino residents of any race comprised 20.3% of the population.

As of the 2020 census, 65.1% of residents lived in urban areas while 34.9% lived in rural areas.

As of the 2020 census, there were 88,567 households in the county, of which 31.9% had children under the age of 18; 49.4% were married couples, 16.6% were male householders without a spouse or partner, and 28.9% were female householders without a spouse or partner. About 26.4% of all households were made up of individuals and 11.5% had someone living alone who was 65 or older.

As of the 2020 census, there were 97,539 housing units, of which 9.2% were vacant. Among occupied housing units, 64.9% were owner-occupied and 35.1% were renter-occupied; the homeowner vacancy rate was 1.5% and the rental vacancy rate was 10.0%.

=== 2010 census ===
As of the 2010 census, Smith County had a population of 209,714, up from its 1850 population of 4,292. Among its 2010 population, the racial and ethnic makeup was 62.11% non-Hispanic white, 17.74% Black or African American, 0.35% American Indian or Alaska Native, 1.22% Asian alone, 0.03% Native Hawaiian or other Pacific Islander, 0.11% some other race, 3.47% multiracial, and 17.21% Hispanic or Latino of any race.

=== American Community Survey ===
At the 2021 American Community Survey, Smith County had a median household income of $63,115; its mean household income was $86,661.

Among the owner-occupied housing units of the county, the median value was $169,600, and there was a median real estate tax of $2,634. Owner-occupied housing units without a mortgage had a median value of $173,700 and median real estate tax of $2,203.

Throughout the county, an estimated 12.51% of the population lived at or below the poverty line.

== Politics ==
Smith County is a stronghold of the Republican Party. In presidential elections, it has voted for the Republican candidate each time since 1952, and Democratic Party candidates have only managed 40 percent of the county's vote four times over that time, the most recent being Jimmy Carter in 1976. From 2000 onward, no Democrat has managed even 30 percent of the county's vote.

Smith County was one of the first areas of Texas to break off from a Solid South voting pattern. The last Democrat to carry Smith County was incumbent President Harry S. Truman in 1948. The county's conservative white voters began splitting their tickets as early as the next election, when it swung from a 29-point win for Truman to a 17-point win for Dwight Eisenhower. In 1964, it rejected Democratic President and Texas native Lyndon B. Johnson in favor of Barry Goldwater, albeit by fewer than 500 votes. It was one of three East Texas counties, along with Panola and Gregg, to vote for Goldwater. At that time, most Blacks and Latinos in the county were still disenfranchised due to the state's discriminatory use of certain barriers.

United States presidential election results for Smith County, Texas
Year	Republican		Democratic		Third party(ies)	
Year	No.	%	No.	%	No.	%
1912	485	14.93%	1,936	59.61%	827	25.46%
1916	773	22.21%	2,422	69.58%	286	8.22%
1920	707	15.13%	2,965	63.45%	1,001	21.42%
1924	1,079	18.85%	4,473	78.16%	171	2.99%
1928	3,493	59.85%	2,343	40.15%	0	0.00%
1932	750	9.15%	7,424	90.53%	27	0.33%
1936	660	8.47%	7,116	91.37%	12	0.15%
1940	1,557	14.19%	9,410	85.74%	8	0.07%
1944	936	9.81%	6,671	69.94%	1,931	20.25%
1948	3,181	28.13%	6,473	57.24%	1,655	14.63%
1952	10,947	56.40%	8,450	43.53%	13	0.07%
1956	12,255	65.21%	6,468	34.42%	69	0.37%
1960	12,042	57.84%	8,494	40.80%	285	1.37%
1964	12,960	50.88%	12,474	48.97%	38	0.15%
1968	12,079	39.51%	8,897	29.10%	9,595	31.39%
1972	23,671	74.37%	8,041	25.26%	115	0.36%
1976	22,238	56.62%	16,856	42.92%	181	0.46%
1980	28,236	64.61%	14,838	33.95%	626	1.43%
1984	40,740	72.60%	15,227	27.13%	152	0.27%
1988	34,658	64.67%	18,719	34.93%	215	0.40%
1992	27,753	47.03%	17,514	29.68%	13,739	23.28%
1996	32,171	59.97%	18,265	34.05%	3,207	5.98%
2000	43,320	71.46%	16,470	27.17%	834	1.38%
2004	53,392	72.48%	19,970	27.11%	302	0.41%
2008	55,187	69.36%	23,726	29.82%	648	0.81%
2012	57,331	72.02%	21,456	26.95%	814	1.02%
2016	58,930	69.52%	22,300	26.31%	3,538	4.17%
2020	69,080	68.85%	29,615	29.52%	1,639	1.63%
2024	74,862	72.07%	28,041	26.99%	976	0.94%

United States Senate election results for Smith County, Texas1
Year	Republican		Democratic		Third party(ies)	
Year	No.	%	No.	%	No.	%
2024	72,205	69.95%	28,971	28.07%	2,052	1.99%

United States Senate election results for Smith County, Texas2
Year	Republican		Democratic		Third party(ies)	
Year	No.	%	No.	%	No.	%
2020	69,574	69.65%	28,385	28.42%	1,928	1.93%
2026	54,516	61.22%	32,615	36.63%	1,920	2.16%

Texas Gubernatorial election results for Smith County
Year	Republican		Democratic		Third party(ies)	
Year	No.	%	No.	%	No.	%
2022	56,608	74.27%	18,763	24.62%	849	1.11%
2026	56,878	63.65%	31,022	34.71%	1,462	1.64%

Smith County is represented in the Texas House of Representatives by Matt Schaefer (R) of Tyler and the Texas Senate by Senator Bryan Hughes (R). Its U.S. Representative is Nathaniel Moran (R).

== Government and infrastructure ==
The county is governed by a Commissioners Court, made up of four members elected from single-member districts and a county judge elected at-large.

Smith County has the tenth most road miles of any county in the state of Texas, with 1,170 – about the distance from Tyler, Texas to Paradise, Nevada. The Smith County Road & Bridge Department maintains the county's bridges and roads, including mowing the rights of way.

The $39.5 million Smith County Road Bond passed with 73% of the vote on November 7, 2017. The issuance of bonds was for road and bridge construction and major improvements. Road work around the county is well underway. For a list of road projects in the two-phase, six-year bond program, visit www.smith-county.com.

=== Officials ===
Twenty-eight elected officials serve Smith County citizens (county auditor is not an elected position):

Official	Function
County judge	County administration (as presiding member of the commissioners court) and judicial jurisdiction
Commissioners (four, one per precinct)	County administration (commissioners court)
Sheriff	Security and law enforcement
District attorney	Law enforcement and criminal prosecution
Constables (five, one per precinct)	Law enforcement
Justices of the peace (five, one per precinct)	Judicial/legal jurisdiction
District clerk	Judicial support to district courts
County clerk	Clerk of record for the county
County tax assessor-collector	Collector of property taxes and special fees
County treasurer	County's chief banker
County court at law judges (three)	Judicial/Legal jurisdiction
District judges (four)	Judicial/legal jurisdiction

== Education ==
These school districts serve school-aged children in Smith County:

- Arp Independent School District
- Bullard Independent School District (also partially in Cherokee County)
- Chapel Hill Independent School District
- Gladewater Independent School District (mostly in Gregg County and Upshur County, small portion in Smith County
- Lindale Independent School District (also partially in Van Zandt County)
- Troup Independent School District (also partially in Cherokee County)
- Tyler Independent School District
- Van Independent School District (mostly in Van Zandt County, small portion in Smith County)
- Whitehouse Independent School District
- Winona Independent School District

Those wishing to attend institutions of higher learning in the area can attend:

- Tyler Junior College
- Texas College
- University of Texas at Tyler

== Media ==
Smith County is part of the Tyler/Longview/Jacksonville DMA. Local media outlets are: KLTV, KTRE-TV, KYTX-TV, KFXK-TV, KCEB-TV, and KETK-TV.

KTBB, an AM radio station based in Tyler, provides a news-talk format to the area.

The daily Tyler Morning Telegraph is the primary newspaper in the county, based in Tyler. Coverage of the area can also be found in the Longview News-Journal, published in Longview, in Gregg County.

== See also ==
- Caldwell Zoo
- Carnegie History Center
- Cotton Belt Depot Train Museum
- Goodman-LeGrand House
- List of museums in East Texas
- National Register of Historic Places listings in Smith County, Texas
- Recorded Texas Historic Landmarks in Smith County
- Texas Rose Festival
- Tyler Museum of Art
- Whitaker-McClendon House
