= Swan, Texas =

Swan
- Unincorporated community
- Swan
- Location within the state of Texas Swan (the United States)
- Coordinates: 32°26′06″N 95°22′02″W
- Country: United States
- State: Texas
- County: Smith
- Time zone: UTC-6 (Central (CST))
  - Summer (DST): UTC-5 (CDT)
- ZIP codes: 75706
- Area codes: 430, 903
- GNIS feature ID: 1348110

Swan is an unincorporated community in central Smith County, Texas, United States. It is located on U.S. Highway 69, three miles north of Tyler. According to the Handbook of Texas, in "...1892 Swan had a population of 200, ten fruit growers, a blacksmith, a carpenter, two doctors, a railroad agent, three schoolteachers, three cotton gins, a general store, and a sawmill." Swan is currently home to a long-standing popular motocross track.

The community is part of the Tyler Metropolitan Statistical Area.
