= Jamestown, Texas =

- Unincorporated community
- Location within Texas Location within the United States
- Coordinates: 32°35′09″N 95°35′04″W
- Country: United States
- State: Texas
- County: Newton County, Texas
- Elevation: 433 ft (132 m)
- Time zone: UTC-6 (Central (CST))
  - Summer (DST): UTC-5 (CDT)
- Area codes: 430 & 903
- GNIS feature ID: 1380864

Jamestown (also known as Berrien, Jimtown, and Old Jamestown) was an unincorporated community in Smith County in the US state of Texas. The site was part of the Edward Pierce Survey and was located at the intersection of Mound Indian Trail and the Starrville-Omen Road. In 1846 the town was first settled, and in 1853 David and Elizabeth Steber began laying out streets and selling lots under the condition that no taverns be built. When a post office was built in 1855, the postmaster, JB Hall, changed the name of the community from Berrien to Jamestown. There were five Methodist and one Baptist ministers, three blacksmiths, two wagon makers, two general stores, and a cabinetmaker operating there by 1858. The 1860 census recorded three teachers in the Jamestown common school.

In 1861, Company G of the 14th Texas Voluntary Infantry of the Confederate States Army was raised in Jamestown.

According to the Texas Almanac, in the years after the American Civil War ended in 1865, Jamestown’s population was 70 to 75, with an economy based mainly on producing and shipping cotton. The Stebers founded the Steber, Butler and Company Storehouse and donated two acres for a Methodist church. In 1873, the International-Great Northern Railroad was built in the area, and its company executives offered lots in nearby Overton. This caused Jamestown to decline. By 1903, there remained a one-teacher school for the town’s 19 White pupils and a three-teacher school for 84 local Black pupils. This school district eventually became a part of the Chapel Hill Independent School District. Only a church, a cemetery, and a few occupied houses appear in a 1959 map. In 1964 the last local business closed down. Jamestown no longer appears in maps after 1973.
