= Remembering Now =

Studio album by Van Morrison
- Released: 13 June 2025
- Length: 68:07
- Labels: Exile; Virgin
- Producer: Van Morrison

Van Morrison chronology
| New Arrangements and Duets (2024) | Remembering Now (2025) | Somebody Tried to Sell Me a Bridge (2026) |

Singles from Remembering Now
- 1. "Down to Joy" Released: 27 February 2025; 2. "Cutting Corners" Released: 1 May 2025; 3. "Remembering Now" Released: 11 June 2025

Remembering Now is the 47th studio album by Northern Irish singer-songwriter Van Morrison, released on 13 June 2025, by Exile Productions and Virgin Records. It is Van Morrison's return to original songwriting following cover albums and reworkings of his songs. The first single, "Down to Joy", was released on 27 February 2025, having originally appeared in the soundtrack to the 2021 Kenneth Branagh film Belfast and subsequently been nominated for the Academy Award for Best Original Song. Other contributors to the album include Fiachra Trench, Don Black and Seth Lakeman. The album's second single, "Cutting Corners", was released on 1 May 2025, while the album's title track was released on 11 June 2025.

Writing in AllMusic, Thom Jurek singled out "Stretching Out" as "simply one of his most transcendent songs ... Morrison's been rambling in strange territory for the last five years, but this is proof that the restless wandering spirit didn't forget his Muse, or who he is."

Professional ratings
Aggregate scores
| Source | Rating |
|---|---|
| Metacritic | 79/100 |
Review scores
| Source | Rating |
| AllMusic | 4/5 stars |
| Uncut | 8/10 |
| i | 3/5 stars |
| Mojo | 4/5 stars |

== Track listing ==
All tracks are written by Van Morrison.

Remembering Now track listing
| No. | Title | Length |
|---|---|---|
| 1. | "Down to Joy" | 3:38 |
| 2. | "If It Wasn't for Ray" | 3:17 |
| 3. | "Haven't Lost My Sense of Wonder" | 5:28 |
| 4. | "Love, Lover and Beloved" | 5:14 |
| 5. | "Cutting Corners" | 3:06 |
| 6. | "Back to Writing Love Songs" | 3:57 |
| 7. | "The Only Love I Ever Need Is Yours" | 2:36 |
| 8. | "Once in a Lifetime Feelings" | 4:38 |
| 9. | "Stomping Ground" | 5:15 |
| 10. | "Memories and Visions" | 6:49 |
| 11. | "When the Rains Came" | 6:23 |
| 12. | "Colourblind" | 3:31 |
| 13. | "Remembering Now" | 5:20 |
| 14. | "Stretching Out" | 8:55 |
| Total length: | | 68:07 |

== Personnel ==
Credits adapted from Tidal.

- Van Morrison – vocals, production, VideoWriter (all tracks); electric guitar (tracks 2, 4–6, 8, 10, 12–14), acoustic guitar (3, 7, 9, 11), saxophone (4, 5, 9, 10, 12)
- Ben McAuley – mixing, engineering
- Tony Cousins – mastering
- Crawford Bell – background vocals (1–10, 12–14)
- Dana Masters – background vocals (1–6, 8, 13, 14)
- Colin Griffin – drums (1, 2, 4–6, 8, 10–14), background vocals (2, 4, 11), percussion (5, 13, 14)
- Richard Dunn – Hammond organ (1, 2, 4–6, 8, 10–14), background vocals (2, 4, 11), Rhodes (11)
- Pete Hurley – bass (1, 2, 4–6, 8, 10–14)
- Stuart McIlroy – piano (1, 2, 5, 6, 8, 10, 12, 14)
- Dave Keary – acoustic guitar (1, 5–8, 10, 12), electric guitar (1, 5, 6, 10–12), lap steel guitar (5), bouzouki (8, 10, 12), background vocals (11)
- Paul O'Reilly – saxophone (1, 2, 13)
- Mike Barkley – trumpet (1, 13), saxophone (2)
- Kelly Smiley – baritone vocals (1), background vocals (13, 14)
- Jolene O'Hara – background vocals (2–10, 12)
- Alan "Sticky" Wicket – percussion (2, 6, 10–12)
- John McCullough – piano (3, 4, 7, 9, 13), Hammond organ (3, 7, 9)
- Nicky Scott – bass (3, 7, 9)
- Eamon Ferris – drums (3)
- Seth Lakeman – violin (5, 8, 11)
- Pete Wallace – background vocals (7, 10, 12)
- Joanne Quigley – bandleader (7)
- Fews Ensemble – strings (7)
- Chantelle Duncan – background vocals (11)
- Teena Lyle – background vocals (11)

== Charts ==
Chart performance for Remembering Now
| Chart (2025) | Peak position |
|---|---|
| Austrian Albums (Ö3 Austria) | 7 |
| Belgian Albums (Ultratop Flanders) | 21 |
| Belgian Albums (Ultratop Wallonia) | 118 |
| Croatian International Albums (HDU) | 11 |
| Dutch Albums (Album Top 100) | 11 |
| German Albums (Offizielle Top 100) | 6 |
| Irish Albums (IRMA) | 81 |
| Japanese Dance & Soul Albums (Oricon) | 2 |
| Japanese International Albums (Oricon) | 22 |
| Scottish Albums (Official Charts) | 5 |
| Spanish Albums (PROMUSICAE) | 35 |
| Swedish Albums (Sverigetopplistan) | 49 |
| Swiss Albums (Schweizer Hitparade) | 8 |
| UK Albums (Official Charts) | 11 |
| UK Americana Albums (Official Charts) | 1 |
| UK Independent Albums (Official Charts) | 3 |
| UK Jazz & Blues Albums (Official Charts) | 1 |
| US Top Album Sales (Billboard) | 21 |
