= KNUE =

Radio station in Tyler, Texas

- Tyler, Texas; United States
- Broadcast area: Tyler-Longview-Jacksonville area
- Frequency: 101.5 MHz
- Branding: 101.5 KNUE

Programming
- Language: English
- Format: Country
- Affiliations: Compass Media Networks

Ownership
- Owner: Townsquare Media; (Townsquare License, LLC)
- Sister stations: KKTX-FM; KISX; KTYL-FM

History
- First air date: December 13, 1964
- Former call signs: KDOK-FM (1964–1968)
- Call sign meaning: "kay-new" (initial branding post callsign change)

Technical information
- Licensing authority: FCC
- Facility ID: 25585
- Class: C0
- ERP: 98,000 watts
- HAAT: 327 meters (1,073 ft)
- Transmitter coordinates: 32°15′35.00″N 94°57′2.00″W

Links
- Public license information: Public file; LMS
- Webcast: Listen live
- Website: knue.com

KNUE (101.5 FM) is a Townsquare Media radio station, licensed to Tyler, Texas, United States, serving the Tyler-Longview-Jacksonville area with a contemporary country music format. KNUE operates with an ERP of 98 kW from a transmitter site near Overton in western Rusk County. Studios are located on Brookside Drive in south Tyler in a building shared with Townsquare's other Tyler stations.

== History ==
=== Early years ===
Before KDOK Broadcasting Company, Inc., acquired the station, KGKB-FM broadcast on 101.5 FM and operated with an ERP of 10,000 watts. The earliest confirmed record of KGKB-FM on the air was in 1948 from an issue of Radio Craft. However, no exact date has been found of when KGKB-FM launched.

KDOK Broadcasting Company, Inc., owners of KDOK (1330 AM), signed on 101.5 FM at 1:01 p.m. on December 13, 1964, as the FM counterpart of KDOK; it bore the call letters KDOK-FM as a result. The station, which originally operated from 8:00 a.m. to 11:00 p.m. daily, aired an easy listening format it billed as "Beautiful Music For Discriminating Adults". It originally broadcast with 40,000 watts from a 405-foot (123 m) tower, a fraction of the output it has today. In its early years, it also broadcast Dallas Cowboys games.

The following year, KDOK moved from 1330 AM to 1490 AM, taking over the frequency of the former KGKB, which had been off the air since October 1963. KDOK, a daytimer at 1330, had been desiring to operate full-time and was not able to do so without a frequency change. It then spun off 1330 to Aubrey Irby and John Dorris, owners of KZAK-FM, who had wanted to operate AM service; that station then took on the KZAK call letters. KDOK-FM was not affected and remained with the KDOK Broadcasting Company.

On November 12, 1968, KDOK-FM changed call letters to the present KNUE; at the time, they were originally pronounced on-air as "kay-new". There was no change to the existing programming. In June 1971, KNUE became Tyler's first radio station to begin broadcasting in multiplex stereo.

In July 1980, KDOK Broadcasting Company, by this time controlled by Mary Adams Yow, the widow of station founder Dana Adams, announced that they would be selling KDOK-KNUE to Golden Eagle Broadcasters for $1.2 million. Additionally, Golden Eagle paid Yow $150,000 to not compete with Golden Eagle through the purchase or establishment of another radio station in the market area. Golden Eagle was principally owned by local businessman Bob Rodgers, who was the president of Whitehouse State Bank and a 57% owner of Texas Community Antenna Systems, a Tyler-based cable television operator serving 130,000 customers in Texas and Arkansas (but not Tyler itself). By this point, KNUE had upgraded its power output to 100,000 watts but was still on its original tower. The FCC approved the acquisition in November 1980, and Golden Eagle took control of the stations on November 19.

=== KNUE goes country ===
On Friday, September 10, 1982, Broadcasters Unlimited and its president, Don Chaney, announced that it would be purchasing KDOK and KNUE from Golden Eagle for $1.775 million. However, Broadcasters Unlimited already owned rival AM station KTBB, meaning KDOK would have to be divested to a third party. At the time, FCC regulations forbade an entity from owning more than one station on each band in a given market. KDOK was spun off to Turner Communications, who owned KAGC in Bryan, for $532,500. This transaction resulted in KDOK and KNUE having separate ownership for the first times in their histories and giving KTBB its first FM counterpart. Chaney announced that his company would be conducting market research before deciding on the direction their new acquisitions would take. KNUE was then re-located into a building on Brookside Drive that had been newly constructed for just KTBB; a second story was added on to accommodate KNUE. This building is still home to KNUE today and also houses the rest of its present-day sister stations.

At noon on February 7, 1983, KNUE left the air to relocate its equipment and operations to the Brookside Drive facility. The next day at 6 a.m., KNUE returned to the air. Coinciding with the move to the new facility came a new format: after 18 years in the easy listening format, KNUE adopted its present, long-running country format using the branding "Continuous Country KNUE 101 FM", promising to play no less "than three great country hits in a row". The change worked. By 1988, the station led in all but one daypart among audiences 18–34 and 25–54 in the market.

By 1987, the station had modified its branding to the current "101.5 KNUE", using the slogan "The Country Channel". That same year, the station began producing and syndicating "The Indie Bullet Top 10 Countdown", which was billed as "offering tomorrow's country stars today". The one-hour weekly show, created by Tyler music producer and promoter Roy Haws, featured artists signed by independent labels, and was hosted by the station's morning DJ, Alex Price; it was also broadcast on 200 other stations across the country.

Broadcasters Unlimited expanded its operation to include a second FM station, KISX (107.3 FM), in 1990 in an early local marketing agreement.

=== From local to corporate ownership ===
The 1990s saw rapid shifts in ownership as the industry consolidated. Broadcasters Unlimited sold itself to GulfStar Communications in 1994 for $12.5 million, which included KNUE and sister stations in Texarkana and Waco. The Hicks brothers, who founded GulfStar, then sold the company and its 54 stations in 1997 to Capstar Broadcasting Partners, which R. Steven Hicks had formed the year prior. Chancellor Media acquired Capstar for $4.1 billion in 1999, changed its name to AMFM, and then merged with Clear Channel Communications in a $23 billion transaction that October.

Clear Channel retained the Tyler cluster until 2007, when it began downsizing and selling off smaller-market stations. The company sold 52 stations in 11 markets in Texas, Oklahoma, and Arkansas, including KNUE, to Gap Broadcasting, a Dallas-based company owned by George Laughlin. Gap Broadcasting and co-owned Gap West were merged with the former Regent Communications to form Townsquare Media after Oaktree Capital Management, already an investor in the Gap companies, became the majority owner of Regent after its bankruptcy.

In 2011, Buddy Logan arrived a KNUE and created the syndicated Texas and Red Dirt radio program Radio Texas, LIVE! for 15 years it was the most-respected and electrifying Texas Music show in the country. In December 2025, he left to the dismay of his rabid fanbase.

On August 2, 2021, KNUE dropped the syndicated Big D and Bubba morning show after 21 years in favor of a local morning show hosted by newly appointed brand manager Billy Jenkins and former midday host Tara Holley. The change was made "to do more to support our local businesses" and help the station "do more to give back to our community". After outcry from fans of Big D and Bubba, the show was quickly picked up by rival country outlet KKUS.
