= Encompass Trust =

Youth Development Organization

Encompass: The Daniel Braden Reconciliation Trust is a UK-registered charitable organisation involved in youth development.

== Organization ==
Encompass was set up following the death of Daniel Braden in the 2002 Bali Bombings by his family and girlfriend. Determined to make something good out of the tragedy, their decision attracted a lot of media attention for Encompass.

Encompass works with youths from the UK, US, Israel, the Palestinian Territories and Indonesia in an attempt to break down cultural barriers and promote mutual understanding between young people from these countries.

Encompass' work has been described as an important in tackling the problem of 'bringing together Israelis and Palestinians' and as having 'a key role to play in our post-9/11 world'.

== Partnerships ==
From 2005 until 2010 Encompass worked in partnership with the Outward Bound Trust UK, with the 'Journey of Understanding' taking place at an Outward Bound centre either in Scotland or Wales.

Since 2010, Encompass has been working with The Prince's Trust, with their Pembrokeshire Adventure Centre in Wales playing host to the 'Journey of Understanding' participants.

US participants come from the student body of Syracuse University, one of Encompass' Partners.

Encompass works with other groups and organisations with similar objectives, both in the UK and abroad. For instance the Berakah Project played at a recent fundraising music event, 'A Peace of Music', in July 2011. They have also worked with other charities including Freedom from Torture, with whom they put on a gig in May 2010, raising money for the two charities.
