= Accentuate the Positive =

Accentuate the Positive may refer to:

- "Ac-Cent-Tchu-Ate the Positive", 1944 song by Harold Arlen and Johnny Mercer that was performed by many popular artists.
- Accentuate the Positive (Bing Crosby album) (1962)
- Accentuate the Positive (Al Jarreau album) (2004)
- Accentuate the Positive (Van Morrison album) (2023)
- Accentuate the Positive, an episode of the sitcom Goodnight Sweetheart
