= Paul Schafer =

Paul Schafer, Paul Schäfer, Paul Schaefer, Paul Shafer or Paul Shaffer may refer to:

- Paul Schafer, inventor of the Schafer automation system
- Paul Schäfer, a German sect leader
- Paul Schäfer (politician), a German politician
- Paul Schaefer (ice hockey), an ice hockey player
- Paul W. Shafer, an American politician
- Paul Shaffer, a Canadian musician
