= KXAL =

KXAL may refer to:

- KXAL-LP, a defunct low-power radio station (104.7 FM) formerly licensed to serve Chalk Hill Community, Texas, United States
- KZQX, a radio station (100.3 FM) licensed to serve Tatum, Texas, which held the call sign KXAL-FM from 2001 to 2009
- KHFZ, a radio station (103.1 FM) licensed to serve Pittsburg, Texas, which held the call sign KXAL-FM from 1987 to 2001
