= KNDF =

KNDF may refer to:

- Karenni Nationalities Defence Force, an armed insurgent group in Myanmar formed in response to the 2021 Myanmar coup d'état.
- KNGR, a defunct radio station (1560 AM) formerly licensed to serve Daingerfield, Texas, United States, which held the call sign KNDF from 2018 to 2020
- KRDK-TV, a television station (channel 38/PSIP 4) licensed to serve Valley City, North Dakota, United States, which used the call sign KNDF-TV from December 2014 to January 2015
- KAZH-LD, a low-power television station (channel 35, virtual 57) licensed to serve McAllen, Texas, which used the call sign KNDF-LP from 2004 to 2011
