= KYZS =

- Tyler, Texas; United States
- Broadcast area: Tyler-Longview area
- Frequency: 1490 kHz
- Branding: All Hit Radio K-DOK

Programming
- Language: English
- Format: Classic hits
- Affiliations: Kilgore Bulldogs

Ownership
- Owner: Charles Conrad; (Chalk Hill Communications, LLC)
- Sister stations: KDOK; KZQX

History
- First air date: May 22, 1928
- Former call signs: KGKB (1928–1965); KDOK (1965–1990)
- Former frequencies: 1070 kHz (1928–1931); 1500 kHz (1931–1941)

Technical information
- Licensing authority: FCC
- Facility ID: 72779
- Class: C
- Power: 1,000 watts (unlimited)
- Transmitter coordinates: 32°22′28.00″N 95°16′24.00″W
- Translator: See § Translator
- Repeater: 1240 KDOK (Kilgore)

Links
- Public license information: Public file; LMS
- Webcast: Listen live
- Website: kdokradio.com

KYZS (1490 AM) is a radio station licensed to Tyler, Texas, United States, paired with an FM translator and simulcast with KDOK in Kilgore, serving the Tyler-Longview market with a classic hits format. The station, and translator, are owned by Charles Conrad, through licensee Chalk Hill Communications, LLC.

== Translator ==
Broadcast translator for KYZS
Call sign	Frequency	City of license	FID	ERP (W)	HAAT	Class	FCC info	Notes
K239CB	95.7 FM	Tyler, Texas	156967	205	108 m (354 ft)	D	LMS	First air date: July 24, 2007

== History ==
=== Early days of KGKB; move to Tyler ===
The facility was first proposed on March 27, 1928, by E.M., C.T., and E.E. Wilson, d.b.a. the Eagle Broadcasting Company. An application for a construction permit was filed to operate at 1070 kHz, with 50 watts of power, from a transmission site at Fisher & 5th Street in Goldthwaite, Texas. KGKB received its first License to Cover on May 22, 1928.

The facility was again modified and requested an amendment of the license on December 6, 1928, moving the transmission site to Brownwood and the broadcast studio location to Howard Payne College. An amendment was requested to move KGKB's operating channel to 1500 kHz on October 24, 1928, as well as to increase power to 100 watts.

In January 1931, the Wilsons requested to move the facility a second time, this time relocating to East Texas and giving the region its first licensed aural service. A permit was granted for the move to Tyler on March 6, 1931, and officially signed on the air in Tyler on May 15, 1931, continuing to operate at 1500 kHz @ 100 watts unlimited hours, from the new transmission site at the Tyler Commercial College.

This facility is considered the oldest continuously licensed operation in East Texas, preceding both KOCA in Kilgore (1936), and KFRO in Longview (1935).

The KGKB license was transferred from Eagle Broadcasting Company to East Texas Broadcasting Company on January 29, 1932. On November 10, 1936, KGKB was authorized to increase daytime power to 250 watts, while nighttime operations remained at 100 watts. Three years later, on October 3, 1939, KGKB gained authorization to use 250 watts unlimited hours.

On February 13, 1940, the Commission revoked the license of KGKB, effective at 3:00 AM, March 1, 1940. East Texas Broadcasting Company immediately filed a request for a hearing with the Commission, which was granted on February 27, 1940. KGKB was allowed to continue operations during this period, and was federally mandated to change the operating channel from 1500 kHz to the current 1490 kHz, using the same 250 watt power level, as a part of the NARBA reallocation. KGKB officially moved to 1490 on March 24, 1941.

East Texas Broadcasting would ultimately be victorious in the license revocation hearing, resulting in the Commission vacating the Revocation Order on April 2, 1941, and fully licensing KGKB at its new operating channel of 1490 kHz, 250 watts unlimited.

On October 9, 1944, East Texas Broadcasting would procure new stewardship as James G. & Minnie B. Ulmer acquired controlling interest in the corporation, through a purchase of stock from majority partner J.G. Kretsinger. The Voluntary license transfer for KGKB was granted by the Commission on May 22, 1945, and took effect on May 30.

The Ulmers would own KGKB for just over five years, requesting a voluntary assignment of the license to Lucille Buford on October 18, 1950. The request was granted by the Commission 10 days later, with Buford Broadcasting assuming control of the license on October 28. Buford Broadcasting also owned and operated television station KLTV in Tyler, as the first channel to sign on in Tyler-Longview.

Several changes to the 1490 facility accompanied the new ownership, including operating the transmission site remotely from a new studio location at Kilgore Highway and Farm to Market Road 1803, requested on June 1, 1954. The changes were approved on September 8, 1954, separating the transmission site and studio location for the first time since the move to Tyler 23 years earlier.

Lucille Buford sold the KGKB license to Ron Litteral, d.b.a. Ron Litteral Enterprises, Inc. on June 6, 1957, in an effort to purchase another Tyler facility, 1330 KDOK. The license transfer was granted on July 1, 1957. Buford would go on to launch Tyler's first Top 40 format on 1330 KDOK, bringing Tyler into the new era of "Rock n' Roll" music, attracting a large audience, and topping the ratings in Tyler for the better part of the next few years.

Litteral Enterprises would only briefly own KGKB, selling the facility to Oil Center Broadcasting Company on June 15, 1959. Oil Center Broadcasting would re-sell KGKB to O'Connor Broadcasting in October of the same year.

On March 21, 1960, Harry O'Connor would request to move the control point and studios for KGKB from the Kilgore Highway location to 116 South Broadway in Tyler, which was granted on April 8. O'Connor's stewardship of KGKB would ultimately prove to be a literal dark period for the facility, with the Commission deferring the license renewal pending further consideration on July 25, 1962. This would lead the facility to go silent under temporary authorization for lengthy periods of time during the next 3 years.

=== 1330 goes country; Top 40 comes to 1490 ===
On December 20, 1965, KDOK Broadcasting Company purchased controlling interest of KGKB, requesting the now available call set of KDOK which was relinquished on 1330 as a part of a sale of that facility, and also resulted in a switch from Top 40 to Country music, while also obtaining a new call of KZAK. KDOK Broadcasting Company would bring 1490 back to life with the Top 40 format and calls, while also moving the transmission site and studios to the current Loop 323 location, and increased the overall height of the single tower. The changes were completed and officially licensed by the FCC on June 28, 1966.

In July 1967, a new Gates BC-1G transmitter was installed at the Loop 323 tower site, and the resistor was removed in the antenna system. Approval for the changes was granted on August 1, 1967. Ten years later, the transmitter was again changed to a Gates MW-1A in July 1977.

On October 10, 1967, KDOK would be granted an increase in power to the current 1 kilowatt for daytime operations, while the night power remained at 250 watts.

Barbee would transfer KDOK to Dana Adams in 1966, after a failed attempt of Buford Broadcasting to re-acquire the facility, which was dismissed by the Commission, under the continued licensee name of KDOK Broadcasting Company. It was sold by Mary Adams, executrix of the Dana Adams estate, to Copper Valley Broadcasters, Inc. in 1980 after the death of Dana Adams in 1973, and then transferred again to Golden Eagle Broadcasters, Inc in 1981.

Golden Eagle would continue to program the Top 40 format, although adding in some elements of Adult Contemporary music, as AM radio music listening was beginning to wane in the early 1980s. During this period, they would install a Magnavox AM Stereo exciter into the MW-1A in 1983, giving 1490 its first stereo broadcast during its lifetime. This would later be switched to the Motorola C-QUAM unit by 1988. 1490 continued to broadcast in AM Stereo until 1993.

KDOK would continue to program the famed Top 40 format in Tyler for nearly 25 years, facing various forms of competition from newcomers such as KTYL-FM and KPXI, as well as other AM Top 40s in the area such as KLUE in Longview.

=== KDOK throws in the towel; becomes Standards KYZS ===
On New Years Day 1990, the heritage KDOK Top 40/Contemporary Hit Radio format was finally dropped from 1490, reformatting with Big Band and Adult Standards music. The current KYZS call set was granted on February 1, 1990.

=== 1490 drops music; becomes talk ===
The Standards format would continue on with meager success until 1993, when KYZS dropped music altogether, eliminating the C-QUAM AM stereo broadcast in the process, and remained a spoken word format for the next 29 years. Formats included talk radio and sports radio, both in English and Spanish.

Paul Gleiser, d.b.a. Gleiser Broadcasting, L.P. purchased the facility on April 23, 1998.

On November 22, 2021, an application for license reassignment was filed with the Federal Communications Commission to transfer KYZS and its FM relay translator K239CB from ATW Media to Chalk Hill Communications, LLC. of Kilgore, Texas. Chalk Hill owns and operates Soft Adult Contemporary 100.3 KZQX and Classic hits 1240 KDOK in the Longview portion of the measured Tyler-Longview market.

Chalk Hill also operates a 250 watt FM translator from the CBS 19 tower in southeast Tyler, on 97.9 FM, a rebroadcast of KZQX "QX-FM". The deal was consummated and filed with the Federal Communications Commission on January 31, 2022, giving Chalk Hill Communications stewardship of both the oldest and the third oldest continuously operating AM stations in East Texas.

=== Return to K-DOK ===
With the purchase of KYZS and its FM translator finalized, ESPN Radio's sports programming was discontinued on the same day, as the station moved to a direct simulcast of its new AM sister station in Kilgore. The programming change marked the return of the legacy K-DOK branding in Tyler, with 1490 now broadcasting many of the same songs and artists that it aired in its heyday, and marking the first time a secular music format has been broadcast from the AM signal since 1993.

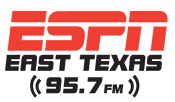
Logo as ESPN 95.7 East Texas

95.7 K239CB is broadcasting a music format in stereo for the first time, having signed on in mono with "ESPN Deportes Radio", and then transitioning to the primary ESPN Radio feed in conjunction with its AM primary.
