= KKTX =

KKTX may refer to:

- KKTX (AM), a radio station (1360 AM) licensed to Corpus Christi, Texas, United States
- KKTX-FM, a radio station (96.1 FM) licensed to Kilgore, Texas, United States
