= Somebody Tried to Sell Me a Bridge =

Studio album by Van Morrison
- Released: 23 January 2026
- Studio: Studio D (Sausalito)
- Genre: Blues
- Length: 79:38
- Label: Orangefield
- Producer: Van Morrison

Van Morrison chronology
| Remembering Now (2025) | Somebody Tried to Sell Me a Bridge (2026) |

Somebody Tried to Sell Me a Bridge is the 48th studio album by Northern Irish musician Van Morrison. It was released on 23 January 2026 through Orangefield Records. Produced by Morrison, the album consists primarily of blues and contains both covers and original material. The record also features multiple guests including Elvin Bishop, Taj Mahal and Buddy Guy.

== Reception ==
Professional ratings
Aggregate scores
| Source | Rating |
|---|---|
| Metacritic | 69/100 |
Review scores
| Source | Rating |
| Americana UK | 7/10 |
| Financial Times | 3/5 stars |
| The Irish Times | 2/5 stars |
| MusicOMH | 3/5 stars |
| So It Goes | 3/5 stars |

Somebody Tried to Sell Me a Bridge was met with "generally favorable" reviews from critics. At Metacritic, which assigns a weighted average rating out of 100 to reviews from mainstream publications, this release received an average score of 69, based on 5 reviews.

Americana UK rated the album 7/10, praising its pacing, variety, and musicianship. Ludovic Hunter-Tilney of the Financial Times lamented that the overall tempo "hardly changes", but called the musicianship "first-rate".

== Track listing ==
Somebody Tried to Sell Me a Bridge track listing
| No. | Title | Writer(s) | Length |
|---|---|---|---|
| 1. | "Kidney Stew Blues" | Eddie Vinson | 3:45 |
| 2. | "King for a Day Blues" | Vinson | 3:46 |
| 3. | "Snatch It Back and Hold It" | Junior Wells; Buddy Guy | 3:58 |
| 4. | "Deep Blue Sea" (featuring Elvin Bishop) | John Lee Hooker | 4:18 |
| 5. | "Ain't That a Shame" | Fats Domino; Dave Bartholomew | 3:27 |
| 6. | "Madame Butterfly Blues" (featuring Elvin Bishop) | Dave Lewis | 5:46 |
| 7. | "Can't Help Myself" (featuring Taj Mahal) | Brownie McGhee; Sonny Terry | 3:42 |
| 8. | "Betty and Dupree" (featuring Taj Mahal) | Chuck Willis | 4:59 |
| 9. | "Delia's Gone" | Blind Blake | 3:20 |
| 10. | "On a Monday" | Huddie Ledbetter | 3:21 |
| 11. | "Monte Carlo Blues" | Van Morrison | 2:54 |
| 12. | "When It's Love Time" (featuring Elvin Bishop) | McGhee; Terry | 2:58 |
| 13. | "Loving Memories" (featuring Elvin Bishop) | Morrison | 4:31 |
| 14. | "Play the Honky Tonks" (featuring Elvin Bishop) | Marie Adams | 3:50 |
| 15. | "(Go to the) High Place in Your Mind" (featuring John Allair) | Allair | 3:53 |
| 16. | "Social Climbing Scene" | Morrison | 3:43 |
| 17. | "Somebody Tried to Sell Me a Bridge" | Morrison | 4:01 |
| 18. | "You're the One" (featuring Elvin Bishop) | Deadric Malone | 4:25 |
| 19. | "I'm Ready" (featuring Buddy Guy) | Willie Dixon | 3:29 |
| 20. | "Rock Me Baby" (featuring Buddy Guy) | B. B. King; Joe Josea | 5:32 |
| Total length: | | | 79:38 |

== Personnel ==
Credits adapted from Tidal.

- Van Morrison – vocals, production (all tracks); saxophone (tracks 1, 2, 14, 15), harmonica (3, 4, 11, 19), guitar (8, 13, 15), arrangement (8), acoustic guitar (16)
- Jim Stern – engineering
- Ben McAuley – engineering (1–17, 19, 20), tambourine (18)
- Jimmy Mahoney – engineering assistance
- Tony Cousins – mastering
- David Hayes – bass guitar
- Anthony Paule – guitars
- John Allair – Hammond organ (1–6, 8, 10, 13, 16–20), piano (7, 9, 12–15, 17, 18), vocals (15)
- Bobby Ruggiero – percussion (1, 3, 6–18), drums (2)
- Mitch Woods – piano (1–6, 8, 10, 11, 14, 19, 20)
- Larry Vann – drums (1, 3–18)
- Jolene O'Hara – background vocals (1, 3, 9, 11, 13, 14)
- Dana Masters – background vocals (1, 3)
- Larry Batiste – background vocals (4–6, 13, 14, 16–18)
- Nona Brown – background vocals (4–6, 13, 14, 16–18)
- Elvin Bishop – guitar (4, 6, 12–14, 18)
- Omega Rae Brooks – vocals (4, 6, 16–18)
- Taj Mahal – harmonica (7–10), vocals (7, 8, 10), banjo (10)
- Crawford Bell – background vocals (9, 11)
- Buddy Guy – guitar, vocals (19, 20)
- Tom Hambridge – drums (19, 20)

== Charts ==
Chart performance for Somebody Tried to Sell Me a Bridge
| Chart (2026) | Peak position |
|---|---|
| Scottish Albums (Official Charts) | 22 |
| Swiss Albums (Schweizer Hitparade) | 57 |
| UK Albums Sales (OCC) | 19 |
| UK Independent Albums (Official Charts) | 13 |
| UK Jazz & Blues Albums (Official Charts) | 1 |
| US Top Blues Albums (Billboard) | 9 |
