= Magnavox =

American electronics company

- Type: Subsidiary
- Industry: Consumer electronics
- Founded: 1917; 109 years ago Napa, California, U.S.
- Founder: Edwin Pridham; Peter L. Jensen
- Headquarters: Knoxville, Tennessee, U.S.
- Products: Odyssey and its successors MX2020 Magnaphone; TVs; Speakers; Blu-ray and DVD players Dehumidifiers; Heaters; Air conditioners Headphones; Batteries
- Parent: North American Philips (1974-1987); Philips (1987–2025); Curtis International Ltd. (2025–present)
- Website: magnavox.com

Magnavox (often stylized as MAGNAVOX; from Latin magna vox 'loud voice') is an American electronics brand that was founded in 1917. It was purchased by North American Philips in 1974, which was absorbed into Dutch electronics company Philips in 1987. The predecessor to Magnavox was founded in 1911 by Edwin Pridham and Peter L. Jensen, co-inventors of the moving-coil loudspeaker at their lab in Napa, California, under United States Patent number 1,105,924 for telephone receivers. Six decades later, Magnavox produced the Odyssey, the world's first home video game console.

== History ==
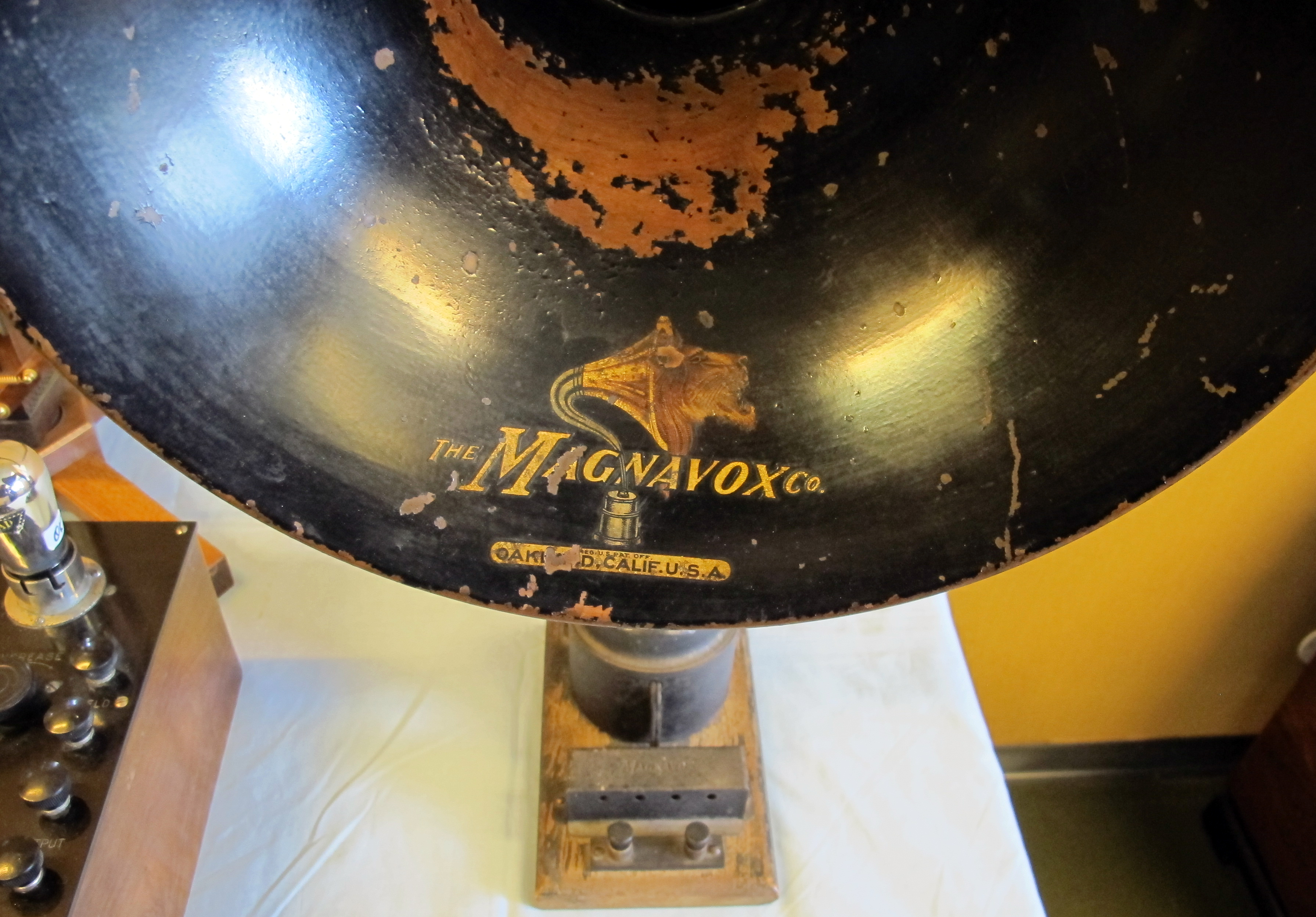
Vintage Magnavox logo on a vintage amplifier

Jensen and Pridham founded the Commercial Wireless and Development Company in Napa, California, United States in 1911, moving to San Francisco, and then Oakland in 1916. In July 1917, a merger with The Sonora Phonograph Distributor Company was finalized and the Magnavox Company was born. Frank Morgan Steers was chosen as the company's first President. Jensen moved on to found the Jensen Radio Manufacturing Company in Chicago, in the late 1920s. Pridham stayed on with Magnavox, which moved manufacturing to Fort Wayne, Indiana by the 1930s. The term "Commercial Wireless" had a different meaning in the early days of radio and telephone. Magnavox manufactured radios, TVs, and phonographs. In the 1960s, Magnavox manufactured the first plasma displays for the military and for computer applications.

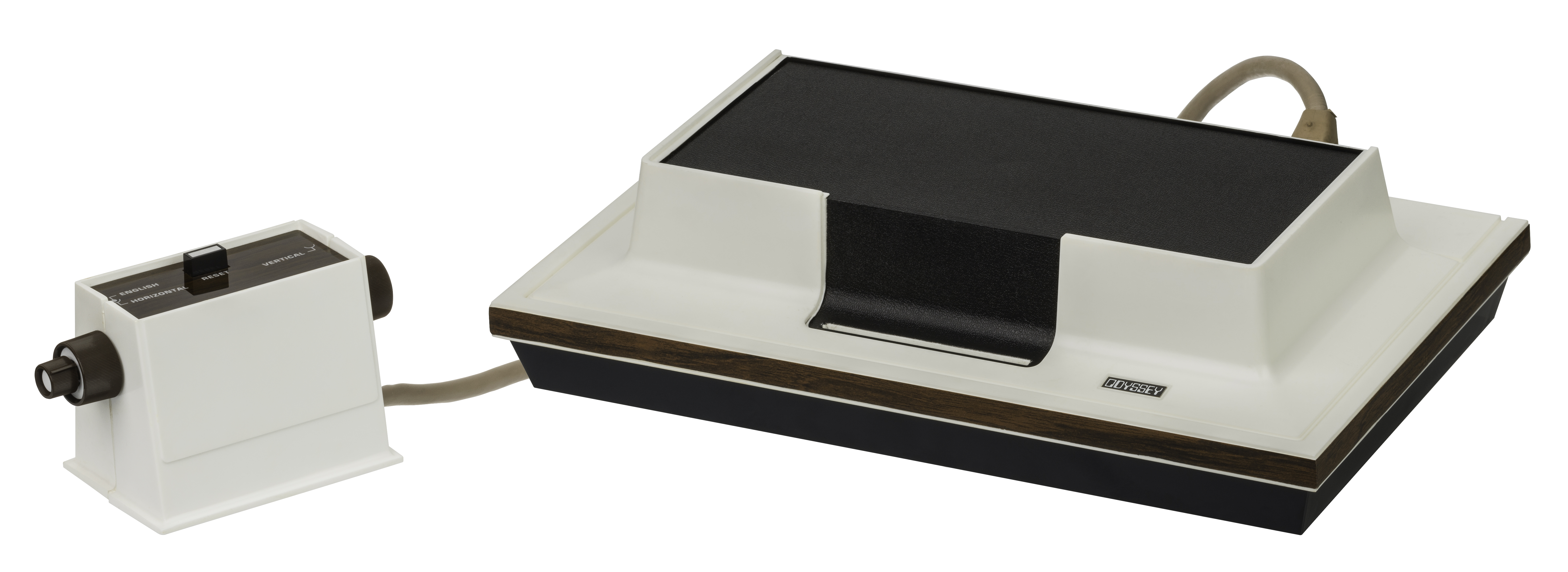
Magnavox Odyssey

In 1972 Magnavox introduced the Odyssey, the first video game console.

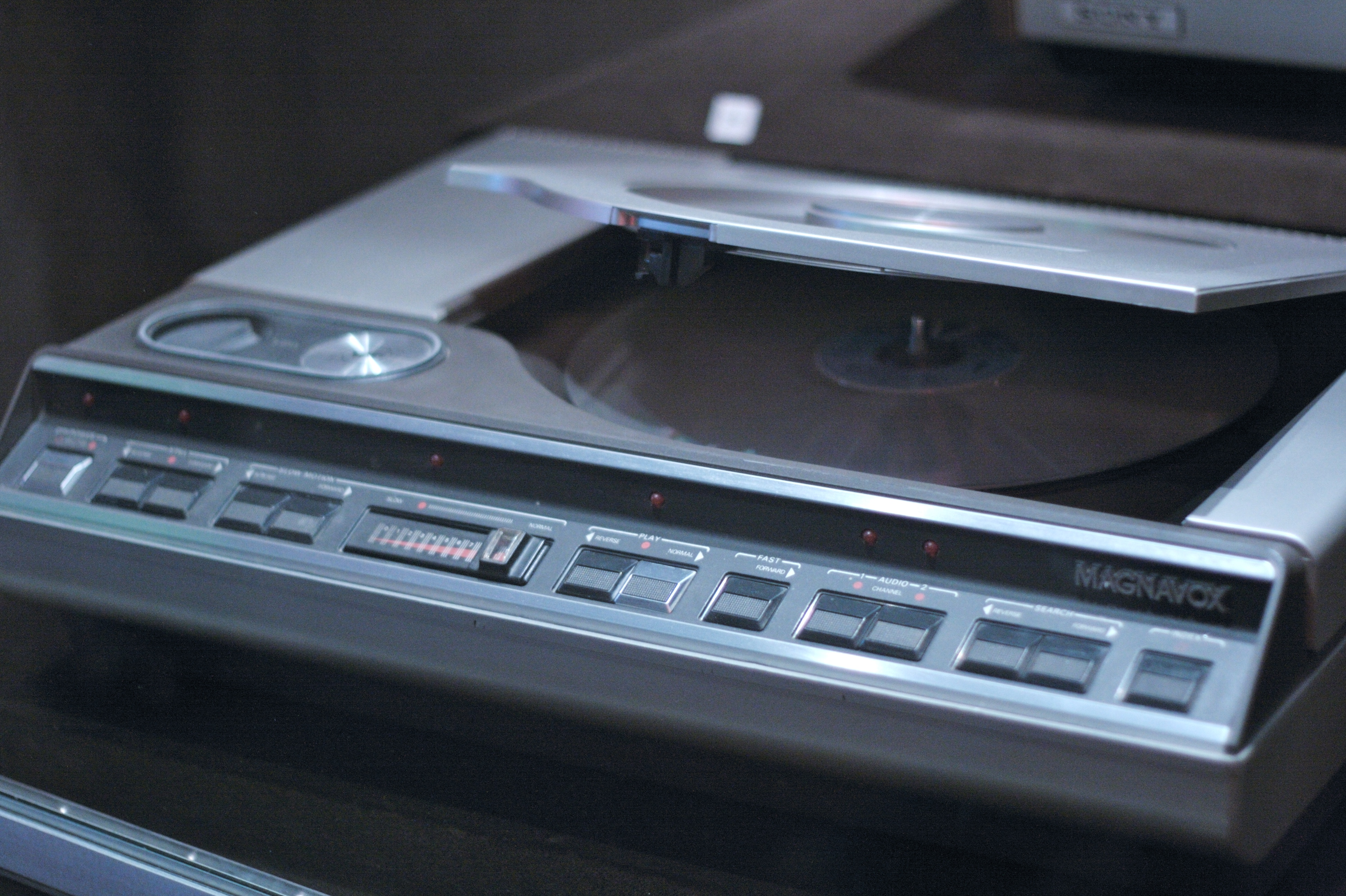
Magnavox LaserDisc player

In 1974, North American Philips acquired a majority stake in the Magnavox Company, which became a wholly owned subsidiary the following year. Philips acquired the similar-sounding company Philco in 1981, and Philips was able to freely use the Philips name, alternating with the Magnavox name for some electronics, with the personal care business continuing to use the Norelco name. In the late 1970s, Philips developed LaserDisc technology, producing an optically read, 12 inch disc that would contain recorded video material. In the early 1980s, Philips worked with Sony to create a standard for optical audio discs (CDs), using the technology developed for the LaserDisc. Teamed with Sony, Philips used the Magnavox brand name to introduce the CD-DA standard and equipment for consumer audio with the Magnavox player sold in department stores while the Sony CDP-101 went to high-end audio stores.

In 1978, the company released the Odyssey², in Europe also known as Philips Videopac G7000.

In February 1981, North American Philips merged Sylvania, Philco and Magnavox into one division named the North American Philips Consumer Electronics Company headquartered in Knoxville, Tennessee, with a manufacturing plant in Greeneville, Tennessee. The Sylvania plant in Batavia, New York, was closed and all operations moved to Greeneville. Philips also abandoned the Sylvania trademark which is owned by Osram.

In the late 1980s, Philips sold the Magnavox/Philips VideoWriter with some success. Released in 1985, the VideoWriter was a standalone fixed-application word processing machine (electronic typewriter).

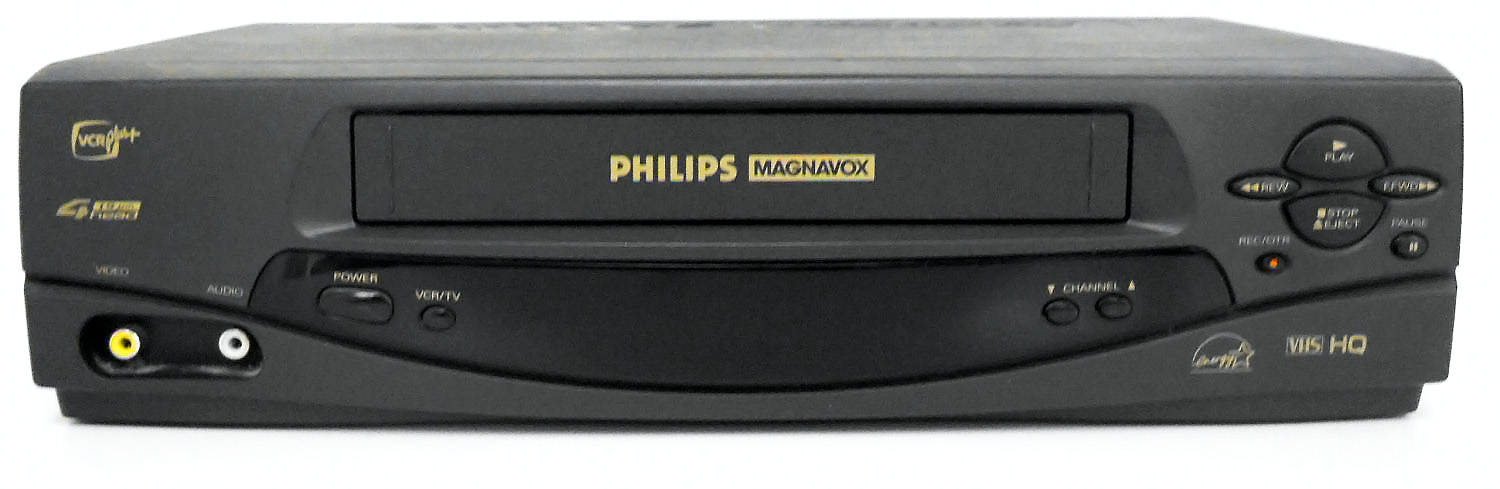
A typical Philips Magnavox VCR

Philips Computers, primarily based in Canada, sold its products in North America under the Magnavox brand with minor rebadging in logo and color scheme of computers, monitors, peripherals and manuals. Philips exited the proprietary personal computer business in 1992. Philips sold the Greeneville plant in 1997 to George Taylor and Charles White.

In the 1990s, several Magnavox branded CD-i players were marketed by Philips.

Starting in the early 1990s, some Philips electronics were marketed under the brand name "Philips Magnavox", in an attempt to increase brand awareness of the Philips name in the United States. While it did work to a degree, it also caused confusion to the consumer as to the difference between "Philips Magnavox" products and "Philips" products, resulting in Philips marketing the two brands separately again.

On January 29, 2013, it was announced that Philips had agreed to sell its audio and video operations to the Japan-based Funai Electric for €150 million, with the audio business planned to transfer to Funai in the latter half of 2013, and the video business in 2017. As part of the transaction, Funai was to pay a regular licensing fee to Philips for the use of the Philips brand. The purchase agreement was terminated by Philips in October because of breach of contract and the consumer electronics operations remain under Philips. Philips said it would seek damages for breach of contract in the US$200-million sale. In April 2016, the International Court of Arbitration ruled in favour of Philips, awarding compensation of €135 million in the process. Magnavox brand name products were formerly made by Funai and Craig Electronics under license from trademark owner Philips.

In January 2025, Curtis International acquired all global rights to the Magnavox brand.

== Licensing ==
The brand also has worked with Funai with their televisions after the Philips Magnavox name was popular. Magnavox also has a brand licensing deal where several of their consumer electronics are manufactured by Craig Electronics and sold under the Magnavox brand.

In Australia, the rights to the Magnavox brand are not owned by Philips but by Mistral Ltd, a Hong Kong trading company that uses it to sell audio/video equipment of a different make.

In Europe, the brand Magnavox was briefly used in the 1990s by Philips on budget consumer electronics to replace traditional local brand names (such as Aristona, Erres, Hornyphon, Radiola, Siera). Since no one recognised the brand name, it was soon discontinued.

== Defense Electronics ==
The defense electronics group, centered in Fort Wayne, Indiana, remained independent under the Magnavox Electronic Systems name, first under Philips and later in the Carlyle Group, until it was acquired by Hughes Electronics in 1995. The three areas of business of the MESC operation during the late 1980s and early 1990s were C-Cubed (Command, Control, and Communication), Electronic Warfare, and sonobuoys. When Hughes Electronics sold its aerospace and defense operations to Raytheon, the former Magnavox defense operations were transferred as well. Shortly thereafter, Raytheon spun off the sonobuoy operation to form Under Sea Systems Inc (USSI), in Columbia City, Indiana. In 1998, Raytheon sold USSI to a British defense consortium named Ultra Electronics. The company is now a wholly owned subsidiary of Ultra, manufacturing water and acoustic sensing and communications devices for military and civil defense.

Among the defense products Magnavox manufactured were the AN/ARC-164 UHF radio, AN/SSQ-53 series sonobuoys, AN/ALQ-128 EW equipment, AN/SSQ-62 series sonobuoys, MX2020 Magnaphone and the Advanced Field Artillery Tactical Data System (AFATDS).
