= What's It Gonna Take? =

2022 studio album by Van Morrison

Studio album by Van Morrison
- Released: 20 May 2022
- Studio: Real World Studios; Bath Spa Hotel, Bath; Richard Dunn Studio; Culloden Hotel, County Down; Holywood Studios; Musicbox Studios, Cardiff
- Genre: R&B
- Length: 79:23
- Language: English
- Label: Exile, Virgin
- Producer: Van Morrison

Van Morrison chronology
| Latest Record Project, Volume 1 (2021) | What's It Gonna Take? (2022) | Moving On Skiffle (2023) |

What's It Gonna Take? is the 43rd studio album by Northern Irish singer-songwriter Van Morrison, released on 20 May 2022. It reached the Top Ten in Germany, Austria and Switzerland, but failed to chart in Ireland. It was also his first solo album in over fifty years not to chart in the US.

== Critical reception ==
While the musicianship and sound of the album was generally well-received by critics, the lyrical subject matter of COVID-19 denialism was widely criticised. In The Arts Desk, Nick Hasted scored it two out of five stars, accused the artist of "monomania", and called the album "egocentric, pernicious, and already outdated". However, he noted that select tracks were of a high quality. AllMusic Guide awarded it two and a half out of five stars, with Stephen Thomas Erlewine finding Morrison "doubling down on all of his gripes", and concluding that the resultant "blend of anodyne R&B and anger makes for one of the odder albums" in his catalogue. In his Pop Medicine column on MedPage Today, Dr. Arthur Lazarus praised the "first-rate" music, but ultimately dismissed the album as a "self-absorbed descent into COVID lunacy". He condemned Morrison for ignoring scientific facts, seeing the pandemic in an egocentric manner, and speaking out against the media while benefiting from its attentions.

In an article bearing the headline, "Van Morrison’s Songs of the Free", National Review said that the "cultural and philosophical breakthrough album asks the question of the age." It finds that, "[singing] from a place of innate liberty", Morrison is "in a vigorous, inventive frame of mind", and concludes that he "describes the culture’s recent repression".

== Track listing ==
All tracks are written by Van Morrison.

| No. | Title | Length |
|---|---|---|
| 1. | "Dangerous" | 7:40 |
| 2. | "What's It Gonna Take?" | 3:23 |
| 3. | "Fighting Back Is the New Normal" | 3:36 |
| 4. | "Fodder for the Masses" | 4:45 |
| 5. | "Can't Go On This Way" | 6:42 |
| 6. | "Sometimes It's Just Blah Blah Blah" | 3:37 |
| 7. | "Money from America" | 7:36 |
| 8. | "Not Seeking Approval" | 6:31 |
| 9. | "Damage and Recovery" | 4:05 |
| 10. | "Nervous Breakdown" | 5:09 |
| 11. | "Absolutely Positively the Most" | 5:20 |
| 12. | "I Ain't No Celebrity" | 4:41 |
| 13. | "Stage Name" | 4:28 |
| 14. | "Fear and Self‐Loathing in Las Vegas" | 5:04 |
| 15. | "Pretending" | 6:47 |

== Personnel ==
"Dangerous"

- Bass guitar – Pete Hurley
- Drums, Backing Vocals – Colin Griffin
- Hammond organ, Backing Vocals – Richard Dunn
- Fiddle, Backing Vocals – Seth Lakeman
- Lead Electric Guitar, Backing Vocals – Dave Keary
- Percussion – Sticky Wicket
- Piano – Stuart McIlroy
- Vocals, Electric Guitar – Van Morrison

"What's It Gonna Take?"

- Backing Vocals – Crawford Bell
- Bass guitar – Pete Hurley
- Drums, Percussion, Backing Vocals – Colin Griffin
- Hammond Organ, Backing Vocals – Richard Dunn
- Percussion – Sticky Wicket
- Piano – Stuart McIlroy
- Saxophone – Paul O'Reilly
- Trumpet – Mike Barkley
- Vocals, Electric Guitar – Van Morrison

"Fighting Back Is the New Normal"

- Backing Vocals – Crawford Bell, Jolene O'Hara
- Bass guitar – Pete Hurley
- Drums, Backing Vocals – Colin Griffin
- Hammond Organ, Backing Vocals – Richard Dunn
- Piano – Stuart McIlroy
- Vocals, Electric Guitar – Van Morrison

"Fodder from the Masses"

- Backing Vocals – Crawford Bell, Dana Masters, Jolene O'Hara
- Bass guitar – Pete Hurley
- Drums – Colin Griffin
- Hammond Organ – Richard Dunn
- Piano – Stuart McIlroy
- Vocals, Electric Guitar – Van Morrison

"Can't Go On This Way"

- Acoustic Guitar – Dave Keary
- Bass guitar – Pete Hurley
- Drums – Colin Griffin
- Hammond Organ, Rhodes piano – Richard Dunn
- Percussion – Sticky Wicket
- Saxophone – Paul O'Reilly
- Trumpet – Mike Barkley
- Vocals, Electric Guitar – Van Morrison

"Sometimes It's Just Blah Blah Blah"

- Bass guitar – Pete Hurley
- Bongos, Congas – Teena Lyle
- Drums, Percussion, Backing Vocals – Colin Griffin
- Hammond Organ, Backing Vocals – Richard Dunn
- Lead Electric Guitar, Mandolin, Backing Vocals – Dave Keary
- Percussion – Sticky Wicket
- Piano – Stuart McIlroy
- Vocals, Saxophone, Electric Guitar – Van Morrison

"Money from America"

- Bass guitar – Pete Hurley
- Drums, Percussion, Backing Vocals – Colin Griffin
- Hammond Organ, Backing Vocals – Richard Dunn
- Lead Electric Guitar, Backing Vocals – Dave Keary
- Percussion – Sticky Wicket
- Vocals, Electric Guitar – Van Morrison

"Not Seeking Approval"

- Backing Vocals – Crawford Bell, Dana Masters
- Bass guitar – Pete Hurley
- Drums, Percussion – Colin Griffin
- Hammond Organ – Richard Dunn
- Piano – Stuart McIlroy
- Vocals – Van Morrison

"Damage and Recovery"

- Backing Vocals – Crawford Bell, Dana Masters, Kelly Smiley
- Bass guitar – Nick Scott
- Drums – Eamon Ferris
- Piano – John McCullough
- Vocals, Saxophone – Van Morrison

"Nervous Breakdown"

- Backing Vocals – Crawford Bell, Jolene O'Hara, Kelly Smiley
- Bass guitar – Pete Hurley
- Drums – Colin Griffin
- Hammond Organ – Richard Dunn
- Percussion – Sticky Wicket
- Piano – Stuart McIlroy
- Saxophone – Paul O'Reilly
- Trumpet – Mike Barkley
- Vocals, Electric Guitar – Van Morrison

"Absolutely Positively the Most"

- Backing Vocals – Crawford Bell, Dana Masters, Kelly Smiley
- Bass guitar – Pete Hurley
- Drums, Percussion – Colin Griffin
- Hammond Organ – Richard Dunn
- Piano – Stuart McIlroy
- Vocals, Electric Guitar – Van Morrison

"I Ain't No Celebrity"

- Backing Vocals – Crawford Bell, Dana Masters, Jolene O'Hara
- Bass guitar – Pete Hurley
- Drums – Colin Griffin
- Hammond Organ – Richard Dunn
- Piano – Stuart McIlroy
- Vocals, Electric Guitar – Van Morrison

"Stage Name"

- Backing Vocals – Crawford Bell, Dana Masters
- Bass guitar – Pete Hurley
- Drums – Colin Griffin
- Hammond Organ – Richard Dunn
- Piano – John McCullough
- Vocals, Electric Guitar – Van Morrison

"Fear and Self-Loathing in Las Vegas"

- Bass guitar – Pete Hurley
- Drums – Colin Griffin
- Hammond Organ – Richard Dunn
- Piano – Stuart McIlroy
- Vocals, Saxophone – Van Morrison

"Pretending"

- Backing Vocals – Crawford Bell, Jolene O'Hara
- Bass guitar – Pete Hurley
- Drums, Percussion – Colin Griffin
- Hammond Organ – Richard Dunn
- Percussion – Sticky Wicket
- Piano – John McCullough
- Saxophone – Paul O'Reilly
- Trumpet – Mike Barkley
- Vocals, Electric Guitar – Van Morrison

Technical personnel

- Design – Paperjam Design
- Engineer [Assistant Engineer] – Katie May (tracks: A1, B5 to B7), Oli Jacobs (tracks: A1, B5 to B7), Oli Middleton (tracks: A1, B5 to B7)
- Illustration – Dameon Priestly
- Mastered By – Tony Cousins at Metropolis Mastering
- Mixed By – Ben McAuley at Rosetta Studio, Belfast
- Produced By – Van Morrison
- Recorded By – Ben McAuley

== Chart performance ==
Chart performance for What's It Gonna Take?
| Chart (2022) | Peak position |
|---|---|
| Australian Albums (ARIA) | 94 |
| Austrian Albums (Ö3 Austria) | 9 |
| Belgian Albums (Ultratop Flanders) | 19 |
| Belgian Albums (Ultratop Wallonia) | 142 |
| Dutch Albums (Album Top 100) | 14 |
| German Albums (Offizielle Top 100) | 8 |
| Italian Albums (FIMI) | 93 |
| Spanish Albums (PROMUSICAE) | 25 |
| Swiss Albums (Schweizer Hitparade) | 7 |
| UK Albums (OCC) | 62 |

== See also ==
- Lists of 2022 albums
