= New Arrangements and Duets =

Studio album by Van Morrison
- Released: 27 September 2024
- Recorded: 2014; 2018-2019
- Genre: Rhythm and blues; swing
- Length: 71:50
- Label: Virgin; Exile
- Producer: Van Morrison

Van Morrison chronology
Accentuate the Positive (2023)	New Arrangements and Duets (2024)	Remembering Now (2025)

Singles from New Arrangements and Duets
- 1. "Choppin' Wood" Released: 26 June 2024; 2. "You Gotta Make It Through the World" Released: 22 August 2024; 3. "Someone Like You" Released: 13 September 2024

New Arrangements and Duets is the 46th album by Northern Irish musician Van Morrison. It was released on 27 September 2024 through Virgin Music Group and Exile Records. Produced by Morrison, the album consists of duets and re-recordings of songs from Morrison's back catalogue, and was recorded in 2014 and 2018-2019.

== Reception ==
In a review for American Songwriter, Lee Zimmerman praised the album as "fresh and vibrant", calling the arrangements "bold and brassy" and saying Morrison "[has] never sounded more inspired". Conversely, Louis Chilton of The Independent called the album a "musically proficient but plodding elevator-ready mix of duets, throwback covers and re-recorded originals", which "falls desperately short of [Morrison's] earlier brilliance", though he did consider it an improvement from Morrison's "dismal" COVID-19 pandemic-era albums.

== Track listing ==
All tracks are written by Van Morrison.

New Arrangements and Duets track listing
No.	Title	Length
1.	"Ain't Gonna Moan No More" (feat. Kurt Elling)	5:32
2.	"Broken Record" (feat. Kurt Elling)	4:20
3.	"Avalon of the Heart"	3:56
4.	"Close Enough for Jazz" (feat. Curtis Stigers)	3:37
5.	"I'll Be Your Lover, Too"	6:39
6.	"Only a Dream"	5:29
7.	"So Quiet in Here"	7:10
8.	"Someone Like You" (feat. Joss Stone)	5:02
9.	"The Beauty of Days Gone By"	5:24
10.	"The Master's Eyes"	5:13
11.	"So Complicated"	4:07
12.	"Choppin' Wood"	3:32
13.	"You Gotta Make It Through the World"	3:23
14.	"What's Wrong with This Picture" (feat. Willie Nelson)	4:45
15.	"Steal My Heart Away" (feat. Willie Nelson)	3:41
Total length:		71:50
