= Craig Electronics =

American consumer electronics company

- Type: Private
- Industry: Consumer Electronics; Vehicle audio
- Founded: 1963; 63 years ago
- Headquarters: Miami, Florida, U.S.
- Key people: Michael L. Newman, President; Joel Newman, Founder
- Website: craigelectronics.com

Craig Electronics is an American brand that specializes in consumer electronics, primarily sold at pharmacies, big-box stores and through online retailers.

== History ==
Craig Electronics was founded in 1963 as a manufacturer of home and car stereos. The company had many celebrity sponsorships for stereo systems, which included The Beach Boys, Ray Charles, Ringo Starr, and Emerson, Lake & Palmer.

In 2001, the company was re-established as a manufacturer of low-cost consumer electronics, including MP3 players, netbooks, and speakers. Craig also has a brand licensing deal to sell certain consumer goods under the Magnavox brand. In 2013, Craig Electronics, along with Curtis International and ViewSonic were sued for patent infringement by MPEG LA.

In 2003, the company's then-president, CEO, and chairman, Richard I. Berger, was found guilty of fraud.

In 2015, Craig Electronics and Curtis International were sued by Seoul Semiconductors for patent infringement.

In 2019, Craig Electronics was acquired by Nova Capital Management, and along with Shur-Line, Bulldog, and World and Main electronics, they now operate under H2 Brands group.

In 2022, Craig Electronics was acquired by Newtech Holding from Nova Wildcat Fund.

In 2026, Craig Electronics was acquired by Kole Imports.

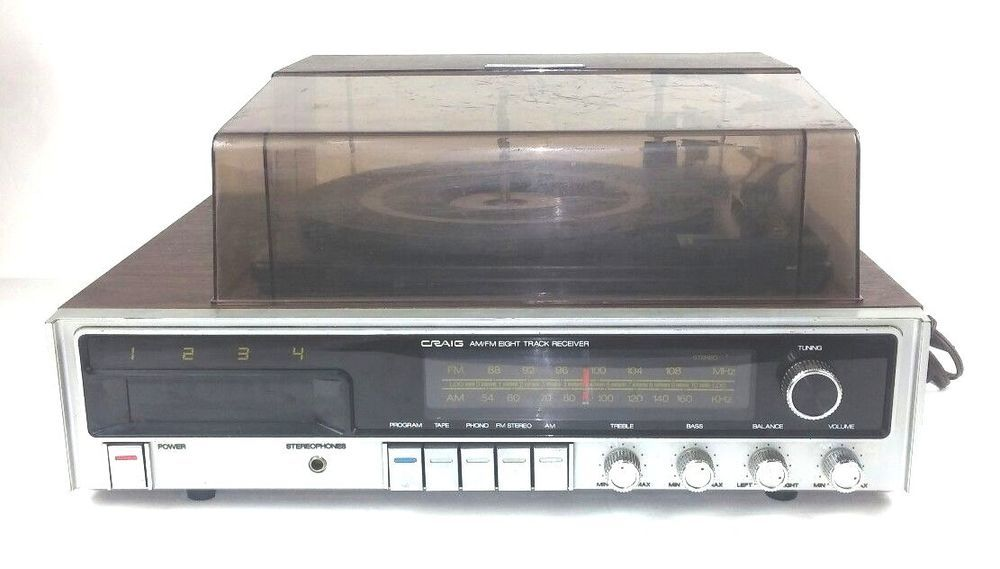
A Craig audio system, 1970s

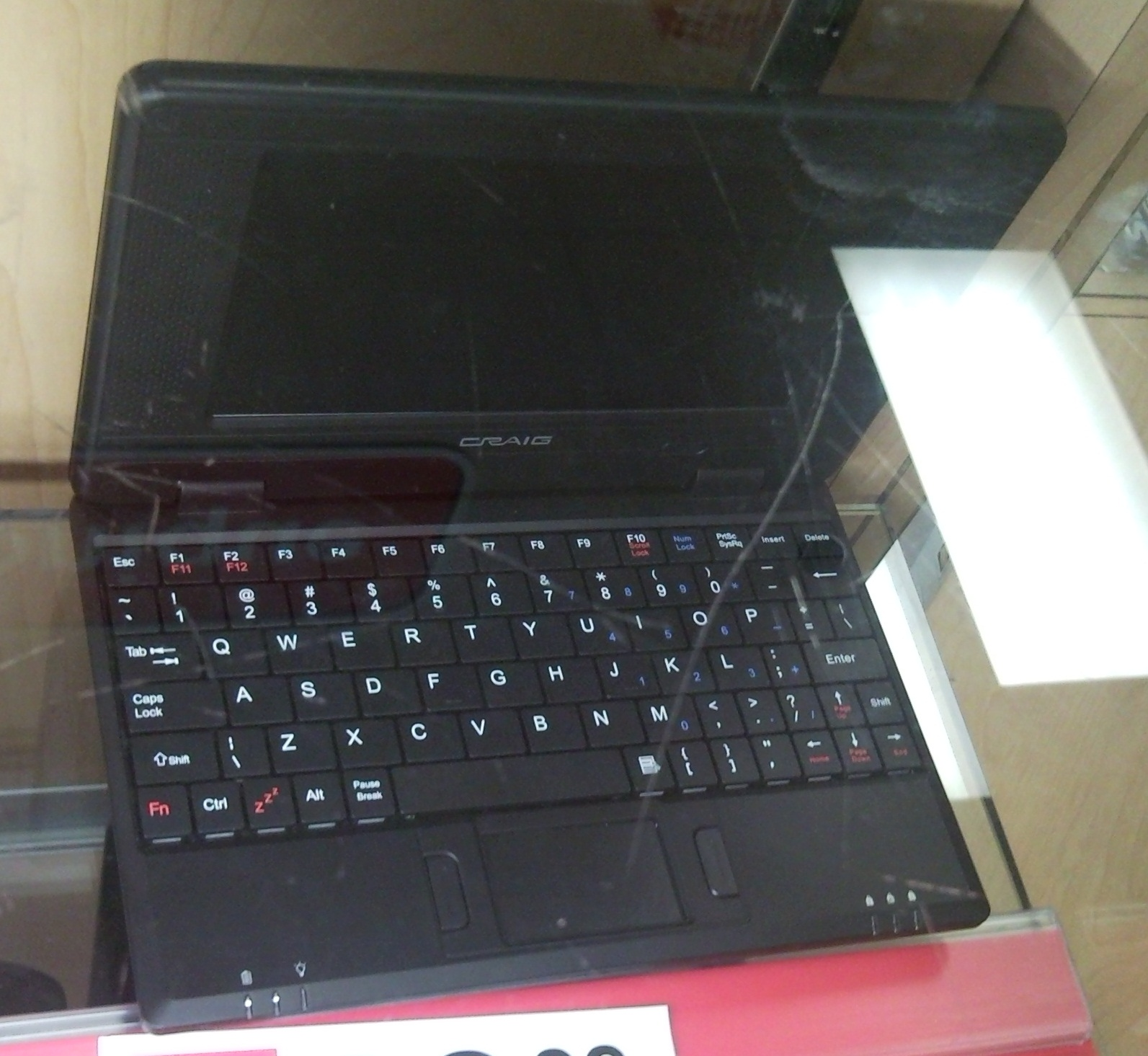
Craig netbook running Android 4.0
