= KNGR =

Daingerfield, Texas; United States
- Frequency: 1560 kHz

Programming
- Format: Defunct

Ownership
- Owner: Network Communications Company

History
- First air date: 1967
- Last air date: December 16, 2018
- Former call signs: KEGG (1966–2004); KNGR (2004–2018); KNDF (2018–2020)
- Call sign meaning: "King Country Radio"

Technical information
- Facility ID: 48311
- Class: D
- Power: 1,500 watts day; 60 watts night
- Transmitter coordinates: 33°01′41″N 94°42′33″W

KNGR (1560 AM) was a radio station licensed to Daingerfield, Texas. The station previously operated as a southern gospel and Christian country format. KNGR was owned by Network Communications Company. In late 2018, while the station was silent, its call letters were changed to KNDF, but it never broadcast with this call sign before it was deleted in 2020.

== History ==
KNGR began broadcasting as a 1,000 watt daytime-only facility in 1967 as KEGG. Charlie Monk, who had been on staff at 1240 AM KOCA in Kilgore, Texas, became one of the original owners. Initially a country station, it was programmed with various formats, in both English and Spanish, during its lifetime.

In the early 2000s, KEGG was granted a license to operate an FM translator at 91.1 MHz. After the translator was found to be originating its own programming, as opposed to its required function of rebroadcasting the main signal from 1560, its license was revoked.

Network Communications purchased KEGG in 2004 and completely rebuilt the facilities. Upon relaunch, KEGG's longtime call letters were replaced and KNGR was born. Standing for "King Country Radio", the format was changed to gospel and Christian country with Bob Wilson, who had programmed and jocked radio stations for over 60 years, at the helm. "King Country Radio" soon found a loyal listener base and served Daingerfield as a family friendly Christian based radio station.

The success of KNGR did not last. Bob Wilson, who was advanced in age, began to have health concerns. This led to several periods of silence for KNGR, beginning in 2010. In addition, co-channel KILE in Bellaire, Texas, was given approval to increase power to 46,000 watts in 2007, sending a significant portion of its signal directly towards east Texas. Once KILE signed on, reception of KNGR was all but lost outside of Daingerfield.

Bob Wilson died in October 2012, and KNGR remained silent or was subjected to interference from the Bellaire station from that point forward. For nearly three years, KNGR broadcast the minimal requirement to maintain the facility license. On July 19, 2013, KNGR returned to regular broadcasting, although most of the programming was recorded material from the late Bob Wilson.

Network Communications again filed to take the facility silent on December 16, 2018, in a letter sent to the Federal Communications Commission requesting Special Temporary Authority to remain off-the-air because the transmission site had suffered extensive damage to the antenna system, due to vandalism and copper theft, as well as the antenna's tuning unit being stripped and a large portion of the coaxial transmission line being cut and stolen.

On December 24, 2018, KNGR changed its call letters to KNDF, eight days after going silent. At the time, station ownership announced that KNDF would air a classic country format once the station returned to broadcasting, but it never made any broadcasts using the new call sign.

The station had until December 17, 2019, at 12:01 AM CDT to return to normal operations or the license would automatically expire by Federal law. The licensee did not meet the deadline to return KNDF to its licensed operational parameters, resulting in a letter being sent by the FCC to Network Communications on February 10, 2020, advising the licensee of the license expiration and subsequent facility deletion for remaining off the air for more than one calendar year. Its license was cancelled August 10, 2020.
