= KKTX-FM =

- Kilgore, Texas; United States
- Broadcast area: Longview, Texas; Marshall, Texas; Tyler, Texas
- Frequency: 96.1 MHz
- Branding: Classic Rock 96.1

Programming
- Language: English
- Format: Classic rock
- Affiliations: Compass Media Networks

Ownership
- Owner: Townsquare Media; (Townsquare License, LLC)
- Sister stations: KISX; KNUE; KTYL-FM

History
- First air date: August 10, 1977
- Former names: 96X
- Former frequencies: 95.9 MHz
- Call sign meaning: Kilgore, Texas

Technical information
- Licensing authority: FCC
- Facility ID: 48952
- Class: C2
- ERP: 50,000 watts
- HAAT: 150 meters (490 ft)
- Transmitter coordinates: 32°22′14″N 94°56′21″W

Links
- Public license information: Public file; LMS
- Webcast: Listen live
- Website: classicrock961.com

KKTX-FM (96.1 MHz) is a Townsquare Media commercial radio station licensed to Kilgore, Texas, serving the Longview/Marshall/Tyler area with a classic rock format. Studios are located in south Tyler, Texas, and the transmitter site is located in Kilgore, Texas.

The station is not affiliated with iHeartMedia owned KKTX 1360 AM, located 361 miles away in Corpus Christi, Texas. KRYS was loaned the use of the KKTX call set by then owner Clear Channel Communications, who also owned this facility at the time.

== History ==
KKTX came to air in 1977 on 95.9 MHz under the ownership of the Noalmark Broadcasting Corporation, a year after Noalmark had bought the permit for unbuilt KCNW from Radio Kilgore, Inc. The studios were co-located in the same Kilgore insurance company building as its sister station, KOCA. It used a state-of-the-art Schafer broadcast automation system - only the second station in the East Texas market to do so - from sign-on to 6:00 p.m. CST Monday—Saturday. Between 6:00 p.m. and midnight, a live DJ played album-oriented rock - Phil Key and "Wolf" were the first two DJs at the console. The original transmitter site was located at the corner of Highway 31 and US 259, at the top of an unusual 500-foot two-leg tower with a platform at the top. Dubbed The Love Rock, its daytime format was Top 40. The General Manager for both stations was Richard Martin, Program Director Jim Hodo, News / Sports Director Paul Bendel, with Chief Engineer Karem Soule. In 1977, FM broadcast radio was still in its infancy in East Texas, because few cars had factory AM/FM receivers. At the time, the lone FM station in East Texas had been selling electronic converters so listeners could receive their programming - albeit in mono rather than stereo - on their AM car receivers. KKTX-FM was only the second station to be operational in the Longview - Tyler - Kilgore market, although at least one other station had a pending application with the FCC. By 1991, the transmitter had been relocated to another Kilgore-area tower, while the studios had relocated to Longview, at a location on Gilmer Road, and operated with live DJs along with an upgraded PC-based automation system. Today, the studios are located in Tyler, at their Brookwood Drive location.

Through most of the 1990s and until 2007, KKTX-FM carried a classic rock format known as 96X. In September 2007, KKTX-FM started mixing active rock tracks with the classic rock that the station featured. At this time, KKTX-FM also changed its slogan from The Classic Rock Station to The Rock of East Texas while still carrying the 96X handle. Soon after, KKTX-FM evolved to an active rock format. KKTX-FM flipped back to classic rock in October 2013.

Today, the radio station features John Boy and Billy, Jen Austin mid-days, Program Director Brian Rickman afternoons, and the Ultimate Classic Rock Show with Zach Martin nights.

== Format change ==
At 2:00 p.m. CST on October 10, 2013 KKTX-FM dropped its active rock format as 96X, and began stunting with snippets of different songs from various genres. Three hours later at 5:00 p.m., KKTX-FM switched to a classic rock format as Classic Rock 96.1. The last song as 96X was Unity by Shinedown and the first song as Classic Rock 96.1 was La Grange by ZZ Top.
