= Moving On Skiffle =

Studio album by Van Morrison
- Released: 10 March 2023
- Studios: Real World (Box, UK)
- Genres: Skiffle; folk; blues; country
- Length: 93:56
- Labels: Exile Productions; Virgin Music
- Producer: Van Morrison

Van Morrison chronology
What's It Gonna Take? (2022)	Moving On Skiffle (2023)	Accentuate the Positive (2023)

Moving On Skiffle is the 44th studio album by Northern Irish singer-songwriter Van Morrison, released on 10 March 2023 by Exile Productions through Virgin Music (successor of Caroline Distribution). The album is Van Morrison's second in the Skiffle genre after his 2000 live album The Skiffle Sessions – Live in Belfast 1998, which saw Morrison collaborate with Lonnie Donegan and Chris Barber. Another skiffle pioneer, Chas McDevitt, was present during the recording sessions for Moving On Skiffle.

== Critical reception ==
Professional ratings
Aggregate scores
Source	Rating
Metacritic	74/100
Review scores
Source	Rating
AllMusic	3.5/5 stars
Financial Times	4/5 stars
The Irish Times	4/5 stars
Uncut	4/5 stars

According to the review aggregator Metacritic, Moving On Skiffle received "generally favorable reviews" based on a weighted average score of 74 out of 100 from 7 critic scores. AllMusic found Moving On Skiffle "relaxed and unhurried" and an "easy record to enjoy." The Financial Times welcomed Morrison's return to the music of his youth (in contrast to the "pub-bore lectures" of his previous two albums) and found that "the music has a richer quality than the spindly tenacity of 1950s skiffle." Uncut likewise welcomed Morrison's "back to basics" approach following "two exhausting albums of political ranting", finding the album "richer and more sophisticated" than The Skiffle Sessions but with "a lightness of touch that recalls Bruce Springsteen's delightful 2006 album of Pete Seeger reinterpretations, We Shall Overcome." The Irish Times praised Dave Keary's guitar and Morrison's voice, concluding "It's good to hear him happy."

== Track listing ==
All songs traditional except as indicated.

Disc 1
No.	Title	Writer(s)	Length
1.	"Freight Train"	Elizabeth Cotten	3:27
2.	"Careless Love"		5:38
3.	"Sail Away Ladies"		3:18
4.	"Streamline Train"	Red Nelson	4:03
5.	"Take This Hammer"		4:38
6.	"No Other Baby"	Dickie Bishop, Bob Watson	4:30
7.	"Gypsy Davy"	Woody Guthrie	4:18
8.	"This Loving Light of Mine (incorporating "Amen")"	Rev. Broadus Henry Hogan and Laura B. Davis ("Amen")	5:11
9.	"In the Evening When the Sun Goes Down"		4:25
10.	"Yonder Comes a Sucker"	Jim Reeves	3:11
11.	"Travelin' Blues"	Jimmie Rodgers, Shelly Lee Alley	3:43

Disc 2
No.	Title	Writer(s)	Length
12.	"Gov Don't Allow" (version of "Mama Don't Allow" with new lyrics by Van Morrison)	traditional, Van Morrison (lyrics)	4:10
13.	"Come On In"		3:39
14.	"Streamlined Cannonball"	Roy Acuff	3:16
15.	"Greenback Dollar"		3:43
16.	"Oh Lonesome Me"	Don Gibson	3:25
17.	"I Wish I Was an Apple On a Tree"		3:14
18.	"I'm So Lonesome I Could Cry"	Hank Williams	3:04
19.	"I'm Movin' On"	Hank Snow	2:58
20.	"Cold Cold Heart"	Hank Williams	3:26
21.	"Worried Man Blues"		4:38
22.	"Cotton Fields"	Lead Belly	3:07
23.	"Green Rocky Road"		9:02

== Personnel ==
Performance

- Crawford Bell – backing vocals
- Chantelle Duncan – backing vocals
- Richard Dunn – organ, backing vocals
- Colin Griffin – drums, backing vocals, percussion
- Pete Hurley – bass
- Dave Keary – electric guitar, backing vocals, acoustic guitar, bouzouki, ukulele, classical guitar, lap steel guitar, mandolin
- Seth Lakeman – fiddle
- Teena Lyle – castanets, backing vocals
- Dana Masters – backing vocals
- Stuart McIlroy – piano
- Van Morrison – acoustic rhythm guitar, electric guitar, harmonica, saxophone, vocals
- Jolene O'Hara – backing vocals
- Sticky Wicket – washboard

Production

- Tony Cousins – mastering
- Katie May – assistant engineer
- Ben McAuley – recording, mixing
- Oli Middleton – assistant engineer
- Van Morrison – production

Other personnel

- Jimmy Page – sleeve notes
- Bradley Quinn – photography
- Steve Stacey – design

== Charts ==
Chart performance for Moving On Skiffle
Chart (2023)	Peak position
Austrian Albums (Ö3 Austria)	5
Belgian Albums (Ultratop Flanders)	7
Belgian Albums (Ultratop Wallonia)	69
Dutch Albums (Album Top 100)	19
German Albums (Offizielle Top 100)	11
Irish Albums (IRMA)	32
Portuguese Albums (AFP)	20
Scottish Albums (Official Charts)	5
Spanish Albums (Promusicae)	13
Swiss Albums (Schweizer Hitparade)	18
UK Albums (Official Charts)	16
