= KMOO-FM =

- Mineola, Texas; United States
- Broadcast area: Tyler-Longview area
- Frequency: 99.9 MHz
- Branding: K-Moo 99.9

Programming
- Format: Classic country

Ownership
- Owner: Hightower Radio, Inc.
- Sister stations: KWJB

History
- First air date: December 16, 1977
- Former frequencies: 96.7 MHz (1977–2000)
- Call sign meaning: K-Moo (branding)

Technical information
- Licensing authority: FCC
- Facility ID: 35150
- Class: A
- ERP: 6000 watts
- HAAT: 90.0 meters (295.3 ft)
- Transmitter coordinates: 32°45′4″N 95°33′18″W

Links
- Public license information: Public file; LMS
- Website: kmoo.com

KMOO-FM (99.9 FM) is a radio station broadcasting a Classic country format. Licensed to Mineola, Texas, United States, the station serves the Tyler-Longview area. "K-Moo" is currently owned by Hightower Radio, Inc. Studio is located in Mineola and the transmitter is located in Wood County outside of Golden.

== History ==
KMOO-FM began broadcasting on 96.7 MHz December 16, 1977. It was owned by Sam and Joyce Curry, and was the FM sister station to 1510 kHz KMOO. Under Curry's tenure, the station was referred to by its ownership and on air personalities solely as, "K M Double O," and not allowed to call the station "KMOO," with the last three letters pronounced in a manner similar to a noise made by cattle.

Sam Curry sold the station in 1995 when he planned to embark on a race for Wood County Judge as a Democrat, a race he ultimately lost.

In May 2000, KMOO-FM was moved from its original 96.7 MHz operating frequency to 99.9 MHz, as part of a multi-station frequency swap, which resulted in 94.3 MHz KLIS Palestine, Texas moving to KMOO-FM's 96.7 MHz frequency, where it continues to operate as Regional Mexican La Invasora, KMOO-FM moving to 99.9 MHz, displacing KGRI-FM in Henderson, Texas, which in turn moved to 100.3 MHz, and now operates as Standards/Oldies "QX-FM", licensed to Tatum, Texas.
