= KWJB =

Radio station in Canton, Texas

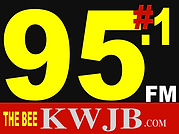
- Canton, Texas; United States
- Frequency: 1510 kHz
- Branding: 95.1 The Bee

Programming
- Language: English
- Format: Full service
- Affiliations: TSN, NAB, TAB

Ownership
- Owner: Butler7Media, LLC
- Sister stations: KMOO-FM

History
- First air date: November 1, 1963 (as KMOO Mineola, Texas)
- Former call signs: KMOO (1963–1993); KJMC (1993–1994); KVCI (1994–2007); KRDH (2007–2012)

Technical information
- Licensing authority: FCC
- Facility ID: 8545
- Class: D
- Power: 500 watts day; 400 watts (critical hours)
- Transmitter coordinates: 32°32′30.00″N 95°51′27.00″W
- Translator: See § Translator

Links
- Public license information: Public file; LMS
- Webcast: Listen live
- Website: www.kwjb.com

KWJB (1510 AM) is a terrestrial American radio station, licensed to Canton, Texas, United States.

It broadcasts a full service format consisting of local talk, classic hits and adult contemporary music. The station is owned by Butler7Media, LLC. KWJB can be streamed through the website and/or mobile app, and is also available on East Texas Cable channel 3.

KWJB broadcasts East Texas high school sports. Broadcasting from the First Monday Trade Days grounds in Canton, Texas, which hosts 100,000+ people each month who visit the world-famous shopping event.

== Translator ==
Broadcast translator for KWJB
Call sign	Frequency	City of license	FID	ERP (W)	Class	Transmitter coordinates	FCC info	Notes
K236CH	95.1 FM	Canton, Texas	156925	250	D	32°32′23.00″N 95°45′41.00″W	LMS	First air date: March 20, 2014 (as 95.7 K239AN Canton)

== History ==
KWJB was initially proposed by J.A. Windham and Lee Robinson, under the name of Mineola Broadcasting Company on March 28, 1963. The callsign of KMOO was assigned to the permit on May 8, 1963, and received a License to Cover on November 1. J.A. Windham, who by this time had bought out his partner Lee Robinson's part of the station, sold the facility to Dean Angel and Sammy Curry, d.b.a. Mineola Radio on October 23, 1967.

KMOO originally operated as a 250-watt daytime-only facility, from a transmission site on U.S. Highway 69, 1.5 miles north-northwest of Mineola. The facility was authorized to use an auxiliary site, transmitting from the original U.S. 69 tower, on August 6, 1974.

KMOO was granted a construction permit to increase power to the current 500 watts on October 8, 1976, and received a license to cover both the main and auxiliary sites on January 18, 1977.

Although the facility was assigned the KMOO calls upon sign-on, and held on to the set for nearly 30 years, it was initially strictly prohibited for station personnel to refer to the station as "K-Moo" by Sam Curry of Mineola Radio. Instead, the station branded as "K-M-double O" for many years. The current continuation of KMOO, which still resides in Mineola on 99.9 FM, having signed on by Curry as the FM counterpart to this facility in 1977 on 96.7 MHz, is indeed now referred to as "K-Moo", instead of the long time "double O" brand associated with the KMOO calls.

After nearly 30 years of service to Mineola on 1510 kHz, the KMOO calls were replaced, with this facility being reassigned the calls of KJMC on July 2, 1993, while the FM counterpart remained KMOO-FM, as it is currently. KJMC would again change calls to KVCI on September 8, 1994.

On January 23, 1997, KJMC filed a major modification to leave Mineola and build a new transmission site two miles south of Canton, as well as changing its community of license from Mineola to Canton. This move would be granted and issued a construction permit by the Federal Communications Commission, with the facility receiving a license to cover from the new site near Canton exactly one year later on January 23, 1998.

KVCI would request and be assigned new callsign KRDH on January 1, 2007, and being issued the current KWJB calls on July 4, 2012.
