= Peter L. Jensen =

Danish-American engineer, inventor and entrepreneur

- Born: Peter Laurits Jensen; 16 May 1886; Falster, Denmark
- Died: 26 October 1961 (aged 75); Western Springs, Illinois, United States
- Occupations: Engineer, inventor, entrepreneur

Peter Laurits Jensen (16 May 1886 – 26 October 1961) was a Danish American engineer, inventor and entrepreneur. He founded Magnavox Company and Jensen Radio Manufacturing Company.

== Biography ==
Peter Laurits Jensen was born on May 16, 1886, near Stubbekøbing on the island of Falster, Denmark. His parents were Lods Ole Jensen, a navigator, and Hansine Petersen Jensen. His education began in the village school of Moseby, where he showed some promise; he later studied at the boarding school in Norre Alslev and three years later he passed the entrance exam for Copenhagen university. He died in 1961 in Western Springs, Illinois, at the age of 75.

=== Career ===
Jensen began employment as an apprentice in the laboratory of Valdemar Poulsen, the inventor of magnetic recording and the Poulsen System of Radio in 1903. He became an assistant to Poulsen in 1905 and was sent to the United States to assist in introducing the Poulsen Radio Arc System in 1909. He was employed as engineer by the Federal Telegraph Company in California, which purchased the Poulsen patent, until November 1910.

In 1911, he co-founded with Edwin S. Pridham (1881–1963) the Commercial Wireless and Development Co. in Napa, California, utilizing the financial backing of Richard O'Conner and the engineering assistance of master mechanic Carl Albertus. Jensen and Pridham moved from Napa in 1916, and changed the company name in 1917 to the Magnavox Company. Jensen was employed as chief engineer until 1925.

He built with Edwin S. Pridham the first moving coil loudspeaker in 1915. This became known as the electrodynamic principle and from it, the term dynamic speaker later evolved. In 1916 he built and patented the first contained and complete electric reproducing phonograph. He made the first public address system which was used on Christmas Eve in 1915 in San Francisco at a gathering where 75,000 people were present and who heard distinctly all the speeches and announcements. The public address systems under the name of Magnavox were used all over the United States. One was used by U.S. President Woodrow Wilson in 1919. World-wide there were no other companies manufacturing public address systems until 1920. He designed the Magnavox dynamic loudspeaker for reception of radio broadcasting in 1919.

He also invented and patented, with Edwin S. Pridham, the first anti-noise self-neutralizing microphone in 1917 which allowed wireless communication between aircraft and the ground. This type later became known as the lip microphone, widely used in the First and Second World Wars.

Jensen resigned from Magnavox in 1925, and founded the Jensen Radio Manufacturing Company in 1927. He marketed speakers under the trade name "Jensen". He remained president of firm until 1940. He was a consultant to the Radio and Radar Division of the U.S. War Production Board in Washington, D.C., from 1942 to 1946. In 1945, he founded Jensen Industries Inc. to manufacture phonograph needles and later stainless steel sink.

=== Recognition ===
Jensen was made an honorary Member of the Audio Engineering Society in 1955. He was honoured by the American Institute of Radio Engineers. He was elected an Extraordinary Member of the Danish Engineering Society, and knighted by the King of Denmark in the Order of the Dannebrog.

== Bibliography ==
- Peter Jensen, The Great Voice (written in the 1930s and published in 1975 by the Havilah Press, Texas)
- Howard Fertsler, "Jensen, Peter Laurits" in Frank Hoffman, ed. Encyclopedia of Recorded Sound, 2nd. ed. (New YorK: Routledge, 2005) Volume 1, Page 541.
