= KISX =

Coordinates: 32.289°N 95.199°W

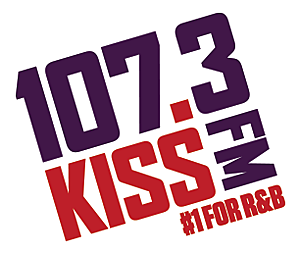
- Whitehouse, Texas; United States
- Broadcast area: Tyler-Longview area
- Frequency: 107.3 MHz
- Branding: 107-3 Kiss-FM

Programming
- Language: English
- Format: Urban adult contemporary
- Affiliations: Premiere Networks

Ownership
- Owner: Townsquare Media; (Townsquare License, LLC)
- Sister stations: KKTX-FM; KNUE; KTYL-FM

History
- First air date: July 8, 1982
- Former call signs: KFML (1982–1984); KEYP (1984–1989)
- Former frequencies: 99.3 MHz (1982–1989)
- Call sign meaning: Kiss FM

Technical information
- Licensing authority: FCC
- Facility ID: 72661
- Class: C2
- ERP: 50,000 watts
- HAAT: 148 meters (486 ft)

Links
- Public license information: Public file; LMS
- Webcast: Listen live
- Website: 1073kissfmtexas.com

KISX (107.3 FM) is a Townsquare Media radio station licensed to Whitehouse, Texas, serving the Tyler/Longview market with an urban adult contemporary format. Studios are located in south Tyler; transmitter site is located southeast of Tyler in Smith County.

== History ==
=== Early years ===
The station began broadcasting on 99.3 MHz on July 8, 1982, as KFML. The Class A station had studios and offices at Whitehouse and aired an adult contemporary music format.

In April 1983, the Federal Communications Commission (FCC) approved the sale of KFML from Hine Broadcasting Company to Barry Turner and John C. Culpepper Jr., who also owned Tyler AM station KDOK. KFML changed its call letters to KEYP on January 10, 1984, and the station late in the year adopted a contemporary hit radio format. KEYP and KDOK were sold in 1986 to a group from Lawton, Oklahoma, as Turner and Culpepper's company, Broadcast Properties, focused on larger markets.

=== Kiss 107 FM ===
In 1988, Tyler Broadcasting Company with KDOK and KEYP was sold for $1.4 million. A regional reallocation of radio frequencies in 1989 saw KEYP upgrade to a new frequency, 107.3 MHz, and an effective radiated power of 50,000 watts. Tyler Broadcasting Company wanted to replace the pop format of KEYP with a "superstation" offering a format with regional appeal. As a result, upon changing frequencies on February 21, 1990, it became classic hits "Kiss 107" with the KISX call letters, seeking to appeal to the large baby boomer market.

In December 1990, Broadcasters Unlimited, the owners of KNUE, took over KISX under a local marketing agreement and relaunched the station with a hit radio format. With the new format, the station doubled its market share in Smith County in one year. By 1994, the station was known as Mix 107.3. "KISX 107.3 Whitehouse Tyler, TX September 12, 1998". The 1990s saw rapid shifts in ownership as the industry consolidated. Broadcasters Unlimited sold itself to GulfStar Communications in 1994 for $12.5 million, which included KNUE and sister stations in Texarkana and Waco. The Hicks brothers, who founded GulfStar, then sold the company and its 54 stations in 1997 to Capstar Broadcasting Partners, which R. Steven Hicks had formed the year prior. Chancellor Media acquired Capstar for $4.1 billion in 1999, changed its name to AMFM, and then merged with Clear Channel Communications in a $23 billion transaction that October. The Kiss branding was restored in 2001.

In 2005, the station flipped to urban adult contemporary branded as "Hot 107.3 Jamz". Clear Channel retained the Tyler cluster until 2007, when it began downsizing and selling off smaller-market stations. The company sold 52 stations in 11 markets in Texas, Oklahoma, and Arkansas, including KISX, to Gap Broadcasting, a Dallas-based company owned by George Laughlin. Gap Broadcasting and co-owned Gap West were merged with the former Regent Communications to form Townsquare Media after Oaktree Capital Management, already an investor in the Gap companies, became the majority owner of Regent after its bankruptcy.

KISX reverted to the Kiss moniker, retaining its format, in April 2021. It also changed syndicated morning shows from Steve Harvey to Rickey Smiley.
