= Aristona =

Former electronics brand

Aristona is a brand name used by the Dutch company Philips for consumer electronics in the 1930s–1990s period. It was marketed as a cheaper alternative for those unwilling to pay the price for Philips products. Often Aristona products were simply rebranded old-generation Philips products.

Typical products include turntables, television sets, cassettes and cassette players, 8-track players, radios and DVD players.
