= KTYL-FM =

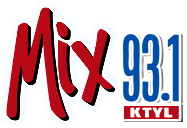
- Tyler, Texas; United States
- Broadcast area: Tyler, Texas metropolitan statistical area
- Frequency: 93.1 MHz
- Branding: Mix 93.1

Programming
- Language: American English
- Format: Top 40
- Affiliations: Compass Media Networks; Westwood One

Ownership
- Owner: Townsquare Media; (Townsquare License, LLC)
- Sister stations: KKTX-FM; KNUE; KISX

History
- Founded: February 1, 1961 (initial CP issued)
- First air date: June 28, 1961
- Former call signs: KSLT (1961–1965); KZAK-FM (1965–1976); KTYL (1976–1979)
- Call sign meaning: Tyler, Texas (city of license and principal city in its broadcast area)

Technical information
- Licensing authority: FCC
- Facility ID: 35711
- Class: C1
- ERP: 82,000 watts
- HAAT: 938 ft (286 m)
- Transmitter coordinates: 32°15′36″N 94°57′03″W

Links
- Public license information: Public file; LMS
- Website: mix931fm.com

KTYL-FM (93.1 MHz) is a Townsquare Media radio station, licensed to Tyler, Texas, serving the Tyler, Texas metropolitan statistical area with a top 40 format. KTYL operates with an ERP of 82 kW from a transmitter site near Overton in western Rusk County, its tudios are located on Brookside Drive in south Tyler in a building shared with Townsquare's other Tyler stations.

== History ==
=== KSLT – Tyler's first FM station ===
The initial construction permit for 93.1 was issued by the FCC on February 1, 1961, to Oil Center Broadcasting Company, owned by L.S. Torrans and Bryan L. Scott of Tyler. Construction of the station was completed by June of that year. Scott noted that the music broadcast by the station would include "everything that has withstood the test of time", which did not include rock and roll. The station was on the air by June 29. It originally operated with 5 kW of power from between the hours 10 a.m. to 10 p.m. daily.

KTYL featured an adult contemporary (AC) format from the 1980s until 1999. In 1999, KTYL switched from AC Lite 93.1 to rhythmic oldies as Jammin' 93.1. This format lasted until November 2001, when KTYL started playing Christmas music. At midnight December 26, 2001, KTYL switched to Hot Adult Contemporary (Hot AC) music as Mix 93.1. The first song on Mix 93.1 was "Jump" by Van Halen. The "Mix" name was previously carried by sister Top 40 (CHR), KISX as Mix 107.3. KISX re-launched as Kiss 107FM prior to the launch of the Mix 93.1.

In the late 2010's, following format changes at numerous other Top 40 stations within the Tyler/Longview market leaving a format hole, KTYL gradually shifted towards a Top 40 music direction.
