= KZQX =

Radio station in Tatum, Texas

- Tatum, Texas; United States
- Broadcast area: Tyler-Longview area
- Frequency: 100.3 MHz
- Branding: QX-FM

Programming
- Language: English
- Format: Oldies/Adult standards

Ownership
- Owner: Charles Conrad; (Chalk Hill Communications, LLC)
- Sister stations: KDOK; KYZS

History
- First air date: November 16, 1965
- Former call signs: KGRI-FM (1965–1997); KDVE (1997–2001); KXAL-FM (2001–2009)
- Former frequencies: 99.9 MHz (1965–2000)

Technical information
- Licensing authority: FCC
- Facility ID: 15982
- Class: A
- ERP: 2,450 watts
- HAAT: 158 meters (518 ft)
- Transmitter coordinates: 32°22′37″N 94°34′18″W
- Translator: See § Translator

Links
- Public license information: Public file; LMS
- Website: kzqx.com

KZQX (100.3 FM) is a radio station licensed to Tatum, Texas, United States, serving the Tyler-Longview market with an Oldies and Adult Standards format. K250AJ (97.9 FM) is an FM translator, licensed to Tyler, Texas, extending the KZQX coverage area to the City of Tyler and southern Smith County, Texas. The station is owned by Charles Conrad through licensee Chalk Hill Communications, LLC.; the translator is owned by the East Texas Community Repeater Group, based in Henderson, Texas.

== History ==
The facility and license began in Henderson as KGRI-FM, at 99.9 MHz. It was the original FM counterpart to the now surrendered and deleted AM 1000 KGRI owned by Jim Reeves. It was moved from 99.9 to 100.3 MHz to accommodate the move of KMOO Mineola from 96.7 to 99.9 MHz in 2000, which also involved several other stations in the area relocating to new operating frequencies.

In November 2009, Chalk Hill Communications purchased the facility and license from then owner Waller Media, moving its own in-house Adult Standards format from 104.7 KZQX-LP to the newly acquired KXAL. Simultaneously, the two stations traded call letters, with 100.3 KXAL becoming KZQX, and 104.7 KZQX-LP becoming KXAL-LP. The 104.7 LPFM license was then donated to The Church at Lake Cherokee, and its format changed to a light classical and jazz presentation.

104.7 KXAL-LP has since been deleted and the license surrendered to the FCC due to "a lack of usefulness," as described in the surrender letter provided by the Licensee.

The original KZQX-LP was one of the first low power FM stations licensed by the F.C.C. in the State of Texas, and has been locally programmed and operated entirely by volunteers since its genesis. The station was established by Charles Conrad with the idea of serving the needs of the people in East Texas.

The Adult Standards format typically appeals to an older demographic segment that is often ignored by corporate broadcasters. KZQX's target audience is predominantly 60+.

== Translator ==
Broadcast translator for KZQX
Call sign	Frequency	City of license	FID	ERP (W)	HAAT	Class	Transmitter coordinates	FCC info	Notes
K250AJ	97.9 FM	Tyler, Texas	142709	165	86.4 m (283 ft)	D	32°18′38.00″N 95°16′19.00″W	LMS	First air date: June 19, 2007
