= Accentuate the Positive (Van Morrison album) =

Studio album by Van Morrison
- Released: 3 November 2023
- Genre: Rock and roll
- Length: 61:41
- Labels: Exile; Virgin
- Producer: Van Morrison

Van Morrison chronology
| Moving On Skiffle (2023) | Accentuate the Positive (2023) | New Arrangements and Duets (2024) |

Accentuate the Positive is the 45th studio album by Northern Irish singer-songwriter Van Morrison, released on 3 November 2023 by Exile Productions and Virgin Records. It is a cover album of Morrison's favourite rock and roll, R&B and country songs. The album received positive reviews from critics.

Accentuate the Positive marks Morrison's second consecutive album of covers and second album of 2023, following on from his album of skiffle covers from March, Moving On Skiffle. Guest musicians on the album include Taj Mahal (vocals on "Lucille" and "Shake Rattle and Roll"), Jeff Beck (guitar on "Lonesome Train"), and Chris Farlowe (vocals on "Lonesome Train").

== Critical reception ==
Professional ratings
Aggregate scores
| Source | Rating |
|---|---|
| Metacritic | 72/100 |
Review scores
| Source | Rating |
| American Songwriter | 4/5 stars |
| Classic Rock | 4/5 stars |
| Mojo | 3/5 stars |
| Record Collector | 4/5 stars |
| Uncut | 7/10 |

Accentuate the Positive received a score of 72 out of 100 on review aggregator Metacritic based on seven critics' reviews, indicating "generally favorable" reception. Uncut stated that "this rock'n'roll album falls far short of Little Richard's atomic excitement in a genre here showing its age, but 78-year-old Van sounds youthly eager, even sensual in between the hushed female harmonies and honky-tonk piano of 'You Are My Sunshine'". David Quantick of Classic Rock called it "something of a relief that Accentuate the Positive is, purely and simply, a covers album" that is "performed with the majestic casualness that only Van Morrison can bring to a song".

Record Collector's Terry Staunton described the album as a "lively mix of swing, jump jive, R&B and classic rock'n'roll [that] constantly plays to the singer's strengths as a thoughtful, inventive interpreter". Mojo felt that "the quieter moments work best, like the moody, organ-led reworking of 'Shakin' All Over', which lesser bands have thrashed into the ground over the years but really shines here". Hal Horowitz of American Songwriter found there to be "a charismatic exuberance in his voice few would expect from someone half his age and nearly six-decade history in music" and concluded that "Morrison and his always top-shelf musicians knock out these songs as if they're hanging around the studio, having a party playing music they love without knowing tapes are running".

== Track listing ==
Accentuate the Positive track listing
| No. | Title | Writer(s) | Length |
|---|---|---|---|
| 1. | "You Are My Sunshine" | Jimmie Davis | 3:42 |
| 2. | "When Will I Be Loved?" | Phil Everly | 3:52 |
| 3. | "Two Hound Dogs" | Bill Haley; Frank Pingatore | 3:01 |
| 4. | "Flip, Flop and Fly" | Charles Calhoun; Lou Willie Turner | 3:52 |
| 5. | "I Want a Roof Over My Head" | Harvey Oliver Brooks | 2:39 |
| 6. | "Problems" | Felice Bryant; Boudleaux Bryant | 4:37 |
| 7. | "Hang Up My Rock and Roll Shoes" | Chuck Willis | 2:42 |
| 8. | "The Shape I'm In" | Cathy Lynn; Otis Blackwell | 2:20 |
| 9. | "Accentuate the Positive" | Harold Arlen; Johnny Mercer | 3:24 |
| 10. | "Lonesome Train" | Dorsey Burnette; Glen Moore; Johnny Burnette; Milton Subotsky; Paul Burlison | 2:58 |
| 11. | "A Shot of Rhythm and Blues" | Terry Thompson | 2:44 |
| 12. | "Shakin' All Over" | Johnny Kidd; Guy Robinson | 3:00 |
| 13. | "Bye Bye Johnny" | Chuck Berry | 2:58 |
| 14. | "Red Sails in the Sunset" | Hugh Williams; Jimmy Kennedy | 2:50 |
| 15. | "Sea of Heartbreak" | Paul Hampton; Hal David | 4:05 |
| 16. | "Blueberry Hill" | Vincent Rose; Larry Stock; Al Lewis | 2:49 |
| 17. | "Bonaparte's Retreat" | Pee Wee King; Redd Stewart | 2:14 |
| 18. | "Lucille" | Al Collins; Little Richard | 2:54 |
| 19. | "Shake Rattle and Roll" | Calhoun | 5:00 |
| Total length: | | | 61:41 |

== Personnel ==
"You Are My Sunshine"

- Backing Vocals – Crawford Bell, Dana Masters, Kelly Smiley
- Bass – Pete Hurley
- Drums, Percussion – Colin Griffin
- Electric Guitar – Dave Keary
- Electric Organ [Hammond Organ] – Richard Dunn
- Piano – Stuart McIlroy
- Vocals – Van Morrison
- Written-By – Charles Mitchell, Jimmie Davis

"When Will I Be Loved?"

- Backing Vocals – Crawford Bell, Dana Masters, Kelly Smiley
- Bass – Pete Hurley
- Drums – Colin Griffin
- Electric Guitar – Dave Keary
- Electric Organ [Hammond Organ] – Richard Dunn
- Piano – Stuart McIlroy
- Vocals, Alto Saxophone – Van Morrison
- Written-By – Phil Everly

"Two Hound Dogs"

- Bass – Pete Hurley
- Drums, Percussion, Backing Vocals – Colin Griffin
- Electric Guitar, Backing Vocals – Dave Keary
- Electric Organ [Hammond Organ], Backing Vocals – Richard Dunn
- Piano – Stuart McIlroy
- Vocals, Alto Saxophone – Van Morrison
- Written-By – Bill Haley, Frank Pingatore

"Flip, Flop And Fly"

- Bass – Pete Hurley
- Drums, Percussion, Backing Vocals – Colin Griffin
- Electric Guitar, Backing Vocals – Dave Keary
- Electric Organ [Hammond Organ], Backing Vocals – Richard Dunn
- Piano – Stuart McIlroy
- Vocals, Alto Saxophone – Van Morrison
- Written-By – Charles Calhoun, Lou Willie Turner

"I Want A Roof Over My Head"

- Backing Vocals – Dana Masters, Kelly Smiley
- Bass – Pete Hurley
- Drums, Percussion, Backing Vocals – Colin Griffin
- Electric Guitar, Backing Vocals – Dave Keary
- Electric Organ [Hammond Organ] – Richard Dunn
- Piano – Stuart McIlroy
- Trumpet, Backing Vocals – Crawford Bell
- Vocals, Alto Saxophone – Van Morrison
- Written-By – Harvey O Brooks

"Problems"

- Backing Vocals – Crawford Bell, Dana Masters, Kelly Smiley
- Bass – Pete Hurley
- Drums – Colin Griffin
- Electric Guitar – Dave Keary
- Electric Organ [Hammond Organ] – Richard Dunn
- Piano – Stuart McIlroy
- Vocals, Alto Saxophone – Van Morrison
- Written-By – Boudleaux Bryant, Felice Bryant

"Hang Up My Rock & Roll Shoes"

- Backing Vocals – Crawford Bell, Dana Masters, Kelly Smiley
- Bass – Pete Hurley
- Drums, Percussion – Colin Griffin
- Electric Guitar, Acoustic Guitar – Dave Keary
- Electric Organ [Hammond Organ] – Richard Dunn
- Music By – Chuck Willis
- Piano – Stuart McIlroy
- Vocals, Alto Saxophone – Van Morrison

"The Shape I'm In"

- Backing Vocals – Crawford Bell, Dana Masters, Kelly Smiley
- Bass – Pete Hurley
- Drums – Colin Griffin
- Electric Guitar – Dave Keary
- Electric Organ [Hammond Organ] – Richard Dunn
- Piano – Stuart McIlroy
- Vocals, Alto Saxophone – Van Morrison
- Written-By – Cathy Lynn, Otis Blackwell

"Accentuate The Positive"

- Backing Vocals – Crawford Bell, Dana Masters, Kelly Smiley
- Bass – Pete Hurley
- Drums, Percussion – Colin Griffin
- Electric Guitar, Acoustic Guitar – Dave Keary
- Electric Organ [Hammond Organ] – Richard Dunn
- Piano – Stuart McIlroy
- Vocals, Alto Saxophone – Van Morrison
- Written-By – Harold Arlen, Johnny Mercer

"Lonesome Train"

- Bass – Laurence Cottle
- Drums – Mez Clough
- Electric Guitar – Dave Keary, Jeff Beck
- Electric Organ [Hammond Organ] – Paul Moran
- Piano – Stuart McIlroy
- Vocals – Chris Farlowe, Van Morrison
- Written-By – Dorsey Burnette, Glen Moore, Johnny Burnette, Milton Subotsky, Paul Burliso

"A Shot Of Rhythm And Blues"

- Backing Vocals – Crawford Bell, Dana Masters, Kelly Smiley
- Bass – Paul Moore
- Drums – Jeff Lardner
- Electric Guitar – Dave Keary
- Piano – Paul Moran
- Tenor Saxophone – Chris White
- Trombone – Alistair White
- Vocals – Van Morrison
- Written-By – Terry Thompson

"Shakin' All Over"

- Bass – Paul Moore
- Drums – Jeff Lardner
- Electric Guitar – Dave Keary
- Electric Organ [Hammond Organ] – Paul Moran
- Tenor Saxophone – Chris White
- Trombone – Alistair White
- Vocals – Van Morrison
- Written-By – Johnny Kidd

"Bye Bye Johnny"

- Backing Vocals – Chantelle Duncan, Crawford Bell, Teena Lyle
- Bass – Pete Hurley
- Drums, Backing Vocals – Colin Griffin
- Electric Guitar [Electric Lead Guitar], Lead Guitar [Electric Lead Guitar], Backing Vocals – Dave Keary
- Electric Organ [Hammond Organ] – Richard Dunn
- Percussion – Sticky Wicket
- Piano – Stuart McIlroy
- Vocals, Electric Guitar [Electric Rhythm Guitar], Rhythm Guitar [Electric Rhythm Guitar] – Van Morrison
- Written-By – Chuck Berry

"Red Sails In The Sunset"

- Backing Vocals – Crawford Bell, Dana Masters, Kelly Smiley
- Bass – Pete Hurley
- Drums – Colin Griffin
- Electric Guitar – Dave Keary
- Electric Organ [Hammond Organ] – Richard Dunn
- Piano – John McCullough
- Vocals, Acoustic Guitar, Alto Saxophone – Van Morrison
- Written-By – Hugh Williams, James Kennedy, Wilhelm Grosz

"Sea Of Heartbreak"

- Backing Vocals – Dana Masters, Jolene O'Hara, Nathan O'Regan
- Bass – Nick Scott
- Drums – Eamon Ferris
- Piano – John McCullough
- Vocals – Van Morrison
- Written-By – Hal David, Paul Hampton

"Blueberry Hill"

- Backing Vocals – Dana Masters, Jolene O'Hara, Nathan O'Regan
- Bass – Nick Scott
- Drums – Eamon Ferris
- Piano – John McCullough
- Vocals, Alto Saxophone – Van Morrison
- Written-By – Al Lewis, Lawrence Stock, Vincent Rose

"Bonaparte's Retreat"

- Backing Vocals – Crawford Bell, Dana Masters, Jolene O'Hara
- Bass – Pete Hurley
- Drums – Colin Griffin
- Electric Guitar – Dave Keary
- Electric Organ [Hammond Organ] – Richard Dunn
- Music By – Pee Wee King, Redd Stewart
- Piano – Stuart McIlroy
- Vocals – Van Morrison

"Lucille"

- Bass – David Hayes
- Drums – Larry Vann
- Electric Guitar – Anthony Paule
- Percussion – Bobby Ruggiero
- Piano – John Allair
- Vocals – Taj Mahal
- Vocals, Alto Saxophone, Acoustic Guitar, Tambourine – Van Morrison
- Written-By – Albert Collins, Richard Penniman

"Shake Rattle And Roll"

- Bass, Backing Vocals – David Hayes
- Drums, Backing Vocals – Larry Vann
- Electric Guitar, Backing Vocals – Anthony Paule
- Electric Organ [Hammond Organ], Backing Vocals – John Allair
- Percussion, Backing Vocals – Bobby Ruggiero
- Piano, Backing Vocals – Mitch Woods
- Vocals – Van Morrison
- Vocals, Banjo – Taj Mahal
- Written-By – Charles E. Calhoun

== Charts ==
Chart performance for Accentuate the Positive
| Chart (2023) | Peak position |
|---|---|
| Austrian Albums (Ö3 Austria) | 11 |
| Belgian Albums (Ultratop Flanders) | 21 |
| Belgian Albums (Ultratop Wallonia) | 179 |
| Dutch Albums (Album Top 100) | 42 |
| German Albums (Offizielle Top 100) | 21 |
| Scottish Albums (Official Charts) | 12 |
| Spanish Albums (Promusicae) | 44 |
| Swiss Albums (Schweizer Hitparade) | 22 |
| UK Albums (Official Charts) | 39 |
| UK Americana Albums (Official Charts) | 2 |
| UK Album Downloads (Official Charts) | 9 |
