= KDOK =

- Kilgore, Texas; United States
- Broadcast area: Kilgore-Longview-Marshall area
- Frequency: 1240 kHz
- Branding: All Hit Radio K-DOK

Programming
- Format: Classic hits
- Affiliations: Kilgore Bulldogs

Ownership
- Owner: Chuck Conrad; (Chalk Hill Communications, LLC)
- Sister stations: KZQX; KYZS

History
- First air date: December 23, 1936
- Former call signs: KOCA (1936–1987); KTXC (1987–1988); KKTX (1988–1999); KBGE (1999–2009)
- Call sign meaning: station branding (pronounced as "Kay-Doc")

Technical information
- Licensing authority: FCC
- Facility ID: 48950
- Class: C
- Power: 1,000 watts (unlimited)
- Transmitter coordinates: 32°25′2″N 94°51′15″W
- Translator: See § Translators
- Repeater: 1490 KYZS (Tyler)

Links
- Public license information: Public file; LMS
- Webcast: Listen live
- Website: kdokradio.com

KDOK (1240 AM) is a terrestrial radio station licensed to Kilgore, Texas, United States, paired with an FM translator, and simulcast with sister station 1490 KYZS, serving the Tyler-Longview market with a Classic hits format.

KDOK signed on the air in 1936 as KOCA, which represented the slogan "Kilgore - Oil Capital of America". The facility is the third oldest licensed broadcast station in East Texas, surpassed only by its broadcast partner 1490 KYZS Tyler, signing on in 1931, and 1370 KFRO Longview in 1935.

== Translators ==
Broadcast translators for KDOK
Call sign	Frequency	City of license	FID	FCC info
K235CV	94.9 FM	Chalk Hill, Texas	200121	LMS
K291CY	106.1 FM	Henderson, Texas	148026	LMS
K287AJ	105.3 FM	Kilgore, Texas	148152	LMS
K270AW	101.9 FM	Longview, Texas	148169	LMS

== History ==
KOCA had a long and rich history of serving the Kilgore community. It ceased to exist on February 9, 1987, as the station became KTXC.

On September 15, 1988, the station changed its call sign once again to KKTX (to match its FM sister station 96.1, which in turn became KKTX-FM, beginning a simulcast between the two that would last over two decades). The two stations were branded "96X", with only a mention of the AM at the required interval. The simulcast would stop during local football games as KKTX and KKTX-FM ran separate games.

On October 19, 1999, the station changed its call letters to KBGE, while maintaining the simulcast with 96X.

On May 7, 2009, the KKTX-FM 96.1 FM simulcast ended when the station started syndicating Scott Shannon's "The True Oldies Channel and picking up the KDOK call sign dropped by 92.1 KTBB-FM in Tyler, Texas.

As of February 24, 2011, KDOK has dropped Scott Shannon's True Oldies Channel and it began stunting with Michael Jackson's "Beat It" on repeat. On February 28, 2011 KDOK changed their format to classic hip hop, branded as "The Beat".

On January 31, 2013, the station was purchased by Chalk Hill Communications, LLC, who owns KZQX-FM (QX-FM). For a brief stunting period, it became "Beatles 1240" while technical changes were implemented. At noon on February 4, the new "All Hit Radio - KDOK" was launched. It is locally produced and programmed, sharing studios with KZQX-FM.

== KDOK call sign history ==
The original KDOK was on 1330 in Tyler, Texas and was licensed and founded by Mrs. Buford, of Buford Broadcasting, who also founded KLTV. In 1965, 1330 dropped the KDOK call letters after 9 years of running the top 40 format in favor of a switch to country. This was accompanied by a switch in call letters to KZAK. KZAK employed well known East Texas Disc Jockeys such as Hoss Huggins and employed engineer Sans Hawkins during this period.

After 1330 dropped the KDOK call letters they went to 1490 in Tyler (which was the original KGKB, the first licensed station in East Texas in 1930), who picked up the Top 40 format and remained as such until 1990, when 1490 dropped Top 40 for Standards. At this point, 1490 picked up new KYZS calls, while 1330 reverted to its heritage KDOK call set.

In 1993, the KDOK call letters and format were moved from 1330 to 92.1 in Tyler (the former country "K-Rose" KROZ), where they lived for another 15 years as an oldies station. In 2009, 92.1 dropped the KDOK call letters and oldies format to begin simulcasting sister station KTBB 600, becoming KTBB-FM.

1240 became KDOK later in 2009, after the oldies format, now satellite fed from the Scott Shannon service, was moved here from 92.1.

Charles Conrad purchased the facility in 2013, dropping "The Beat" format that had been put in place on 1240; at first stunting with an All-Beatles format, then launching the permanent and current classic hits "All Hit Radio 1240 KDOK".
