= VideoWriter =

Electronic typewriter

VideoWRITER
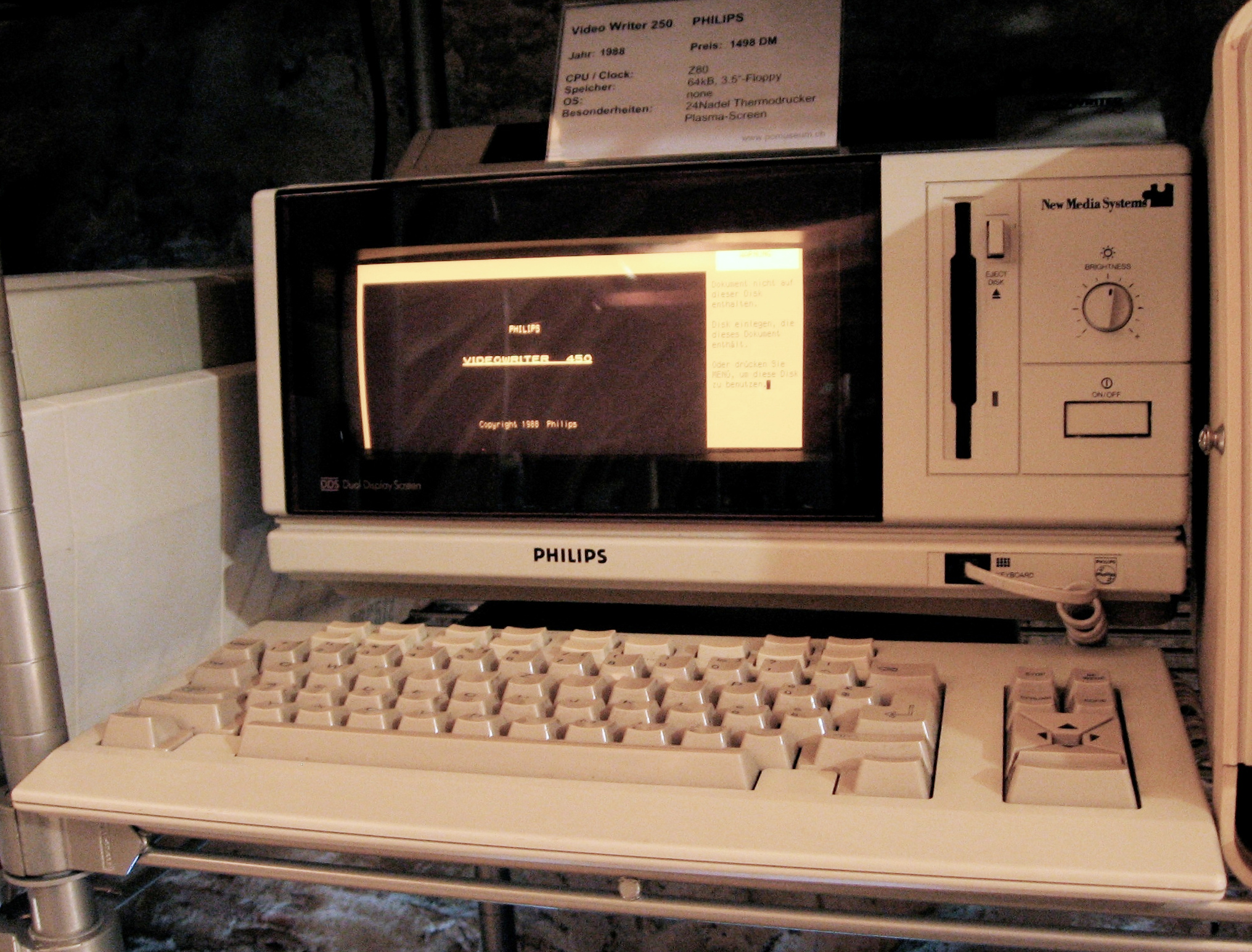
- Philips VideoWriter 450 (1988) with German keyboard
- Developer: Philips Home Interactive Systems (PHIS)
- Manufacturer: Philips
- Type: word processor
- Released: 1985
- Introductory price: US$799 (equivalent to $2,400 in 2025) (U.S.)
- CPU: Hitachi HD64180 or National Semiconductor NSC800N
- Memory: 16 KB RAM; 64 KB ROM
- Removable storage: 3-1/2" floppy disk drive
- Display: 10" CRT amber screen
- Graphics: NCR 7250 video controller

The Philips/Magnavox VideoWriter (styled VideoWRITER) is a standalone, fixed-application, electronic typewriter / dedicated word processor produced by Philips Home Interactive Systems (PHIS), a division of the Dutch electronics company Philips. It includes a 10" CRT amber screen with a wide aspect ratio (i.e. more than 4:3), a black and white thermal transfer printer, a 3.5" floppy drive for saving documents, and dedicated computing hardware, all enclosed in a single case. The keyboard is separate and a custom design whose unusual features include a STYLE key and not just an UNDO key but also a DO key. The VideoWriter is not a freely programmable computer but a typewriter replacement appliance. It is not a laptop machine but was designed to be transportable in either a cloth or hard plastic carry case accessory.

== History ==
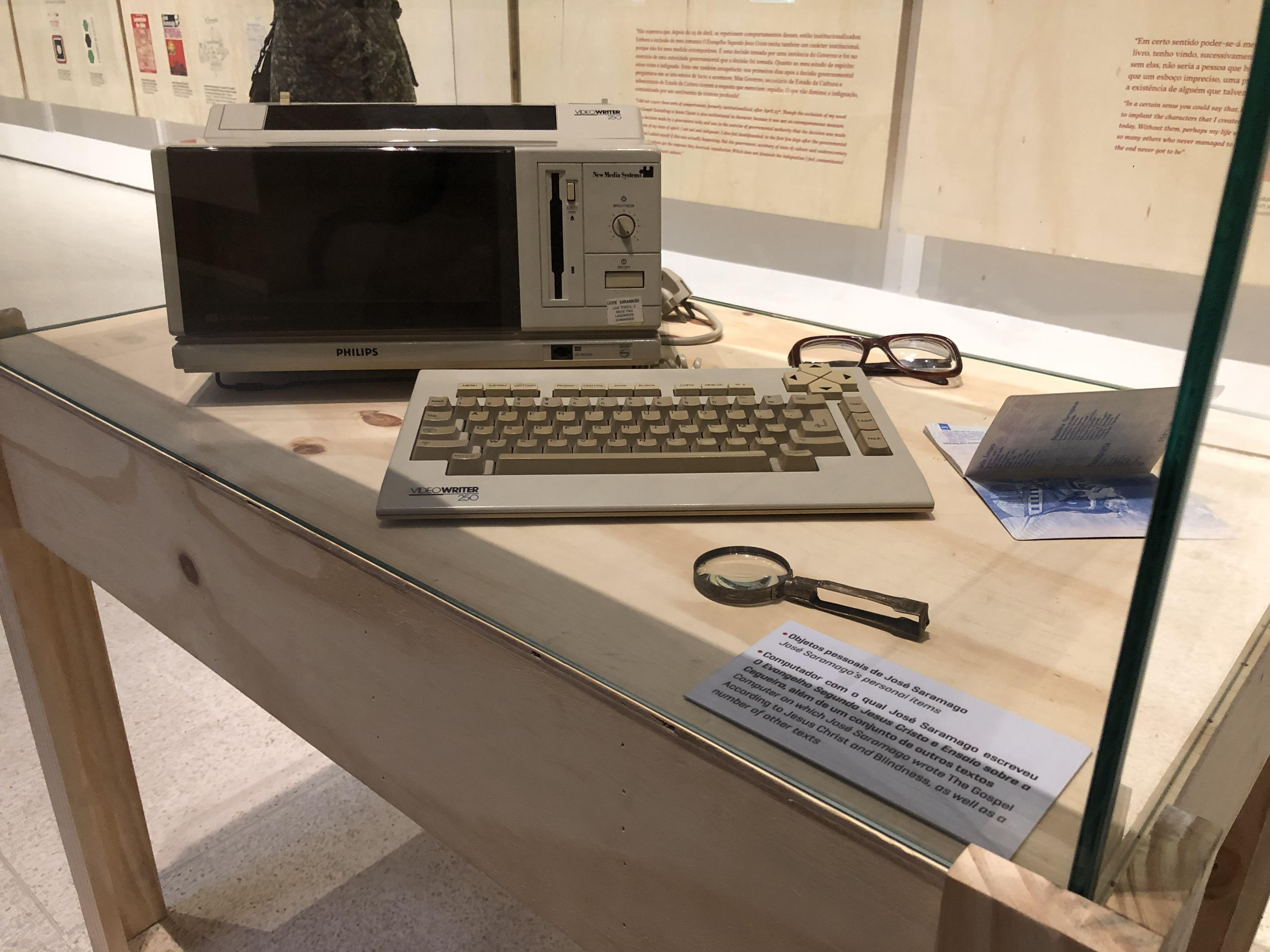
Philips VideoWriter 250 used by José Saramago. AZERTY keyboard layout with action keys labeled in Portuguese. Blindness (published 1995) and The Gospel According to Jesus Christ (published 1991) were written using it.

First released in 1985, the VideoWriter was sold with a moderate degree of success for several years, with worldwide sales in the mid-hundreds-of-thousands. Notable users included Portuguese Nobel Prize Winner José Saramago and American poet Lucille Clifton. Some units were primarily Magnavox-branded and some were just Philips-branded, and there were several models. With the VideoWriter, Magnavox/Philips competed with Coleco, Brother, Smith-Corona and Canon, all of which offered similar inexpensive dedicated word processors. The VideoWriter appeared in the movies 52 Pick-Up, Broadcast News, and repeatedly in Licence to Kill.

The VideoWriter became the principal product of Philips Home Interactive Systems after management decided to discontinue all development of video game consoles and home PCs (even though in 1984, the Magnavox Odyssey held 55% of worldwide console market share). This system was intended to bring $10,000 professional word processors to consumers, targeting high school and college students in particular. While in design, it was nicknamed the PWP, or the "Little Orange" (as the local University of Tennessee sports nickname was "Big Orange"), but this was dropped when Coleco started using the name PWP. The 100+ column amber screen was selected for the very best in readability, along with extra space for on-screen help to the right of the typing area. Similarly, the keyboard was designed with quality ease of typing in mind in all aspects.

After the original version was released in 1985, it was localized to and sold in 11 European countries, although the character set originally included support for Spanish. About a dozen software engineers from the Magnavox Odyssey video game console group (which became PHIS) worked on the product; overall, PHIS at this time employed over 70 people. Not only were there follow-up models, but also a sheet feeder accessory was released for the VideoWriter.

Recognizing that the ink cartridges and the special VideoWriter floppies (which included a 50,000 word dictionary) were ephemeral, the application designed included the ability for the VideoWriter to recognize blank 3-1/2" floppies and format them for VideoWriter use (although without the dictionary feature). Also, the non-reusable thermal transfer ink cartridge can be removed from the printer mechanism, in which case the VideoWriter will print to standard thermal paper sheets, thus allowing the system to be used up to the current day. Although the VideoWriter has the capability to accept program disks, none were ever sold, although game designer Bob Harris designed several entertaining apps, such as an acrostic solver.

The groups that became PHIS included the Philips division that invented LaserDisc technology and designed the first laser video disc player (Bob Gepp was the project manager of this effort). After specifying, along with partner Sony, the fundamental specs for CD music and CD-ROM (the so-called Red, Yellow, and Green Books), the storage area was split off into Philips LMS (Laser/Magnetic Storage), which eventually moved from the PHIS office location to Colorado, forming the nucleus of what would become the storage products industry there. Meanwhile, the Odyssey group had finished designing the next generation Odyssey console as well as the C9000 personal computer system, which would have been the first CD-ROM-based and GUI-based Unix-family system in the personal computer industry. According to PHIS president Lou Arpino, referring to game consoles and PCs: "It's just a Cabbage-Patch Doll phenomenon"—and thus dropping all products except the VideoWriter.

== Design ==
Based on a 1984 motherboard design by PHIS engineer Dan Murphy, that was elegantly simple and able to be manufactured for $25, the VideoWriter used the Hitachi HD64180 or National Semiconductor NSC800N CPU, clones of the Zilog Z80 with a unique pinout, along with an NCR 7250 video controller. The system included 16K RAM, 64K ROM, a 3-1/2" floppy disk drive (possibly the third system to use one after the 1983 ACT Apricot then the 1984 Macintosh), and an integral thermal transfer dot matrix printer. While designed originally to sell for $399, parts were sourced in Europe and Asia that were greatly affected by the inflation that plagued this period in time, and thus it ended up selling in the U.S. for $799 (less than the IBM PC at $1500 or Mac at $2500).

The industrial design for the exterior was created by Duncan Copeland, a Philips designer from Europe assigned to the PHIS operation in Knoxville, Tennessee. The application and thus keyboard layout was designed by Greg L. Weinstein, inspired by the Ashton-Tate MultiMate Advantage software for the IBM PC. Project Manager was Robert S. (Bob) Gepp, lead software engineer was Rexford A. (Rex) Battenberg, and lead developer of the custom operating system was Nicholas (Nick) Vigorito. It was manufactured at the Philips factory in Vienna, originally at the rate of 11 systems/hour, although some of the inventory was remanufactured at the master Magnavox North American warehouse in Jefferson City, Tennessee (an hour away from the PHIS offices).

=== Floppy format ===
The 3-1/2" floppy disk format was proprietary, utilizing single-sided, double-density (80 tracks, 18 sectors/track, 256 byte sectors) resulting in 360 KB storage.

=== Smart Keyboard ===
Although never released, an accessory, named the VideoWriter Smart Keyboard, was well under design at the time of PHIS's shut-down in 1988, principally by Greg Weinstein. The Smart Keyboard was to be roughly 8-1/2 by 11 inches, one inch thick, with a flip-open and adjustable 8-row by 80-column display, a full keyboard, and special function keys. It included the ability to hold over 20 pages of typing, and would have provided a calculator, multi-alarm clock, calculator, and several other convenience functions. When connected to the VideoWriter itself through the RJ14 keyboard connector, documents could be uploaded to the VideoWriter's floppy disk and printed. The hardware chassis was from Kyocera, and was essentially the same as the Radio Shack TRS-80 Model 100 portable computer.
