= Schafer automation system =

System for automating radio station programming

The first Schafer Automation System, installed at KGEE(AM) in Bakersfield, California in 1956, was dubbed the "blue-wire job" because all of the wiring in it was blue, its inventor, Paul Schafer said. "The owner wanted to program his station all night long without a person being there. I used a couple of Seeburg record player changers to play 45s and several Ampex reel decks for commercials and we were in business," Schafer said.

== In the beginning ==
Originally, commercials had to be dubbed sequentially to play back in the right order. Before long, Schafer, with the help of Chief Engineer Jim Harford, designed a better system. The "spotter" used Ampex reel-to-reel tape decks that could fast forward and rewind to count windows cut from the tape in order to locate specific commercials. "We removed about an inch of the oxide from the tape every minute. The 'windows' were then counted by the automation system as they passed between a lamp and a photocell to find the right commercial to play," Schafer said.

The Schafer Automation System used a series of relays and stepping switches and a clock that allowed programmers to back-time music to join network newscasts without having to fade the music. Schafer said the automation system consisted of two racks: one held the "brain," another contained three tape reel-to-reel decks. The Seeburg record player changers held 100 records each.

Programming the system was limited at the beginning. The front control panel consisted of a series of pins to allow programmers to change a sequence or repeat it, Schafer said. "They could set up a pattern by screwing pins into any of the many holes in the clock. Typically this would be each 15 or 30 minutes to play station breaks," Schafer said.

== Silence trigger ==
In the original Schafer Automation System, the switching from one event to the next was triggered by silence. "Whenever silence was sensed the system would step to the next event. There would be the occasional record with a pause that would give us fits, of course," Schafer said. To remedy that problem, Schafer introduced a system using a 25 Hz tone at or near the end of an event on reel-to-reel tape. The tones, which were inaudible to listeners, allowed for overlapping of events and made the system sound better, he said. "The system used stepping switches, like the ones telephone companies used at the time. After the tone or silence, the next element was triggered, which was determined by the setting of switches on the front panel," Schafer said.

Eventually, Schafer's automation system used Viking cartridge decks and then Sono Mag Corp. carousels for commercial playback. Ultimately, broadcasters dubbed music onto reels, which improved the reliability of the automation system and meant the 45s no longer wore out, Schafer said. "For about the first five years after we introduced automation to the radio industry, we were the only ones producing anything of the kind. We sold direct and through Gates, Collins, RCA and IGM," Schafer said.

To help spread the word of his innovation, Schafer had three motor homes traveling the country demonstrating Schafer Automation Systems to radio broadcasters. "The idea was so new, it was the only way to get the idea of automation across," he said. In early 1959, Schafer purchased a radio station of his own to help demonstrate how efficiently a station could be run with automation. The station, KDOT(AM) in Reno, Nev., operated with a staff of three. "The manager did the selling, the engineer was also the announcer and one office manager ran things in fine fashion," he said. His company sold more than 1,000 versions of its automation design, including the Schafer Model 800, probably the most reliable of them all, Schafer said. In fact, some are still in operation at radio stations in Mexico, he said.

Schafer sold Schafer Electronics in 1968, about the time the company was beginning to work on a computer-driven automation system. Applied Magnetics owned the company for a few years before selling to Cetec.

Not one for retirement, Schafer started his current company, Schafer International, in 1969. In 1986 he founded Schafer Digital, where he worked on a new design for a PC-based automation and traffic system. He sold a few systems and then sold the company, he said.

Schafer's background is steeped in broadcast engineering and goes back to his hometown of Hammond, Ind., where he learned to fix radios as a teen at a repair shop. "I was building crystal sets and generally fascinated with making radios work and listening to them. Radio was very, very young at the time," Schafer said. Schafer received his first FCC operator's license in 1942 and went to work for his hometown radio station WJOB(AM). He was delighted to bring home $35 a week playing 78 rpm records and 16-inch transcription discs. The following year, Schafer went to work for WOWO(AM) in Fort Wayne, Ind. The 10 KW station served as a good training ground for a young engineer.

== Station engineer ==
"I learned how to change the big water-cooled tubes in the transmitter that took up two complete floors of a very large building. Very fun," he said. After a stint in the U.S. Army Signal Corps during World War II, Schafer returned to WANE(AM) in Fort Wayne where he worked on the air, sold commercial time and fixed the equipment. "I became a combo operator of sorts. Times were tight and stations couldn't afford an engineer and announcer. I was an engineer sitting between two turntables and with a microphone in front of me," he said.

After WANE was sold, Schafer moved south to Norfolk, Va., to be chief engineer and assistant manager of WNOR(AM). Schafer set out for California in 1951 and landed a job with NBC Hollywood, then home to some of the biggest radio shows off the day, as a summer vacation relief engineer. "Bob Hope, Dinah Shore, Jerry Lewis and Dean Martin. I think those were the last of the golden years of radio. It was fantastic," Schafer said. It was while at NBC that Schafer became aware of a new FCC ruling allowing for radio stations that were nondirectional and 10 KW or less to operate transmitters unattended by remote control. With the help of fellow NBC engineer Bill Amidon, Schafer ordered two phone lines installed between his garage and Amidon's basement.

== Stepping switch ==
"The key was you had to be able to meter and simultaneously you had to be able to raise and lower and turn things on or off. The logical way to do it was with a stepping switch," Schafer said. Using an old rotary phone dial, Schafer incorporated relays to raise or lower a specific element after a number was dialed. "You could dial up number one for plate voltage, maybe two was plate current and maybe three was antenna current. A little meter would show the reading. Then we would have the relays set up to do the function," Schafer said.

The Schafer remote control system marked the birth of Schafer Electronics in 1953. After working out the bugs the first remote control unit was installed at KROW(AM) in Oakland, Calif., Schafer said. It wasn't until 1957 that the FCC amended the rules to allow for the remote control of all broadcast transmitters, thanks in part to NAB field tests filed in 1955 using Schafer remote control systems.

Besides building remote-control equipment and automation systems, Schafer was instrumental in assisting the FCC in field tests demonstrating the worthiness of FM in 1965. "Prose Walker was director of engineering for NAB and wanted to show the world that the United States' proposed standard for broadcasting FM should be adopted by the world. He thought it would help if we could feed a stereo signal to a satellite and get it back," Schafer said. Schafer used several Ampex portable recorders in the middle of the Mojave Desert near Barstow, Calif., to record music and chronicle the tests. The recordings later were played for international engineering groups throughout Europe.

There are those in broadcasting who complain that the automation system Schafer developed more than 45 years ago has led to today's widespread use of voice tracking, which has cost jobs and created a shortage of young talent. "What you hear on the air in most markets today can be attributed to Mr. Schafer ... automation that plays the same mindless drool from a satellite or hard drive," said Jay Swafford, a former on-air personality and program director in several markets, including Nashville, Tenn. "Nowhere have I found that Mr. Schafer's invention added to the listenability of radio, just the enhancement of the bottom line for the corporate office. "Kids have no idea how much fun radio used to be when personality got a chance to shine through the airwaves," Swafford said, who is an audio technician at WTVF-TV in Nashville.

Schafer said he heard many of the same complaints when his automation system became popular. "In the early days of automation, each station produced what their automation system could assemble. Some of the less-creative air talent created material that was far from the best. I guess it will always be that way," Schafer said.

== Programming enhancements ==
Schafer foresees even more changes for the broadcast industry thanks to advances in automation technology. "Great minds will continue to find ways to enhance programming, automation and other aspects of broadcasting," he said.

Schafer, the father of five grown children, lives in Bonita, Calif. One of his sons, Rob, followed him in broadcast engineering and is currently acting director of technical operations for CBS-TV Newspath in New York. And his son Christopher is the webmaster for the www.schaferinternational.com website.

Paul Schafer, age 76, received the NAB Radio Engineering Achievement Award in 2002. The award, given to industry leaders for significant contributions to the advancement of broadcast engineering, recognizes Schafer for six decades of broadcast experience, including his work in the development of on-air automation systems and remote-control equipment for radio.

His friends in broadcasting say Schafer's influence has been felt throughout the industry thanks to his technical innovations. Others decry automation, saying it helped to spur the end of unique local radio programming and led to fewer on-air jobs and the rise of sparsely staffed or unattended stations that use automated programming.

Most industry observers would agree that the Schafer Automation System forever changed the way radio operators run their stations. "His systems were well-built with first class parts. His concepts, now in computer form, are the foundation of many radio stations today," said Andy Laird, vice president of radio engineering for the Radio Journal Broadcast Group and a member of the NAB award nominating committee.

In 1962, I worked as the radio station engineer due to my new FCC Radio telephone First Class license having just graduated from the don martin audio and TV school, Hollywood on the GI bill. Plus, I was the only announcer. The rest of the staff, Radio Station Manager, Salesman, and other staff members were all let go. My duties were to change the tape reels and put new 45 rpm little top 40 records into an automated juke box wired to the console. As I recall it had lots of blue tubes lighting the rack of controls in a huge tall locker. This was my first job just out of the Army, as a DJ for the Armed Forces Radio & TV. So it was a big deal to me. I enjoyed giving the call letters KDOT each morning and reading the news live on the air however all the music was on automated tape. Sadly we had very few sponsors and thus hardly any commercials. Sadly, the Schafer radio station was owned by the Schafer company, which was out of town in California, not Reno Nevada. The job only lasted a few months. The station was going broke. Soon the station closed due to money problems. However Mr. Schafer phoned me to try and stay on the air as he would try to get the funds to keep the station going, but it was already too late. The local Power company in Reno shut off the current to the transmitter (the antenna was some way out of town). When I left the front door was locked (no rear exit) and I returned to LA by auto. Driving out of town the music was still on the car radio but slowly faded out as I drove along the highway. The good news is; I soon worked at another radio station in Santa Monica, Ca that used the same Schafer automation system but was owned by other private party's. The call letters were KSRF FM. This was over 50 years ago.
