= Berakah Project =

UK-based multifaith musical ensemble

The Berakah Project
- Origin: United Kingdom
- Genres: Jazz, Middle Eastern, rock, classical,
- Occupation: musical ensemble
- Years active: 2005–2023
- Members: Mohammed Nazam – guitar Chantelle Duncan – vocals Eustace Williams - acoustic bass Mark Hinton Stewart – keys Abdelkader Saadoun – percussion Serena Leader – violin
- Website: www.theberakahproject.org

Berakah Arts (originally the Berekah Project) was a UK-based musical ensemble and charity organisation founded by guitarist, composer, journalist and writer Mohammed Nazam featuring musicians from Jewish, Christian and Muslim faith heritage backgrounds. Founded in July 2005 it is the first project of its kind in the UK to explicitly draw its musical personnel from their faith heritage. According to Nazam, this was done to show people from different religious communities, with a history of tension, co-operating and working together in a positive light, against a background of growing unrest as a result of the New York 9/11 attacks and the London 7/7 bombings.

The ideology behind the band was to use music to transcend barriers of religion, race and culture as well as encouraging understanding for all human beings.

In 2007 Berakah was given support by The Arts Council of Great Britain which enabled them to perform extensively across the UK in three UK tours, the last one being in 2015. In 2007 they released their debut album "Music for The Heart" which featured compositions fusing Jazz, Classical and Middle Eastern influences.

"The aims of the band are to make good music! But also, through the music and the songs, to encourage non-violence, peaceful coexistence, dialogue between people of differing faiths; to raise awareness of common roots of the three main monotheistic faiths and the celebration of diversity. The real aim though, is to draw audiences from the three faiths so that Jews, Muslims and Christians can sit with each other and enjoy a cultural event and maybe even strike up a conversation. Who knows what could happen then? Some of them might realise that the images they had of the other may have been slightly ill-advised and might actually start talking to each other! Having said that I have to make it clear that Berakah can be enjoyed, and is relevant to, people of faith, people of little faith and those of no faith whatsoever"

Concerts are held in major music venues such as The Purcell Room's in London's Southbank Centre, but also in places of worship so as to draw people of differing faiths into a place usually associated with another community, therefore helping to build bridges and increase understanding between people's, with music as the facilitating element.To this end, concerts have been held in synagogues (Harrow and North West London Progressive Synagogue, London), churches (St Paul's, Covent Garden, St. Anne's Queens Park) and Muslim community Centres (Southwark Muslim Women's Community Centre). The 10th anniversary tour in 2015 was organised in partnership with local community organisations based in locations that had palpable community tensions and were often in the news.

Although dealing with issues of faith the group and its organisational structure are avowedly progressive and liberal, as shown by their Mission Statement which makes it clear that it is a secular organisation, in keeping with the ideals of its founder. To this end, although the musicians are all drawn from a cultural and religious heritage some of them are "observant" or "practicing" and some are not. In 2011 the second album, “One Ray of Light”, was launched with two nights at ‘The Actors Church’ in Covent Garden. The album was a marked departure musically featuring new music especially composed for the album and incorporating more overt Jazz and Classical influences. Their tour of 2015 featured new music and the addition of a string section.

In 2013 the first Berakah Multi Faith Choir was established in The Brent Inter Faith Centre, Queens Park. After two successful years, the choir moves to Richmond and Hillcroft Community College.

In 2015 Nazam recruited members for the youth project, called ‘Increase The Peace’. With a home base at St. Mary’s Church in Acton, the rolling collective of young musicians met once a week to rehearse. In the next few months they also play a number of concerts locally such as open days at Acton Library, the Ealing Jazz Festival and a concert at the Bollo Lane Youth Centre on what was one of West London’s ‘toughest’ estates. They also performed as guests of Rupa Huq MP at the Houses of Commons.

To celebrate the ten year anniversary Berakah Arts (now a charity) embarked on another National Tour, again supported by The Arts Council of England. New music was written especially for the tour and two new members joined– Shirley Smart on cello and Helen Sanders-Hewitt on viola. The music was taken in a more acoustic direction with songs having a more ‘small chamber ensemble’ feel. Again working closely with established community groups in each city, the tour started with a special gala at St. James’ Church in Piccadilly, London. The choir takes part and performs a set of songs and London is chosen as the place to launch the first Berakah Arts Youth Band. The youth band plays a spellbinding set and the whole night is brought to a close with rapturous applause for the new music performed by the Berakah Players.

The tour goes on to perform concerts and workshops in Brighton (Brighton and Hove Methodist Church), Luton (Library Theatre), Leeds (Cross Flatts Park), Rotherham (Old Market Theatre) and Oxford (St. Hilda’s College) which are all ‘hotspots’ of social tensions brought about by potential divisions in the communities. The concert in Leeds was held in the spirit of peace and reconciliation on the commemoration day of the 2007 London terror attacks, as two of the people involved in the bombing came from that community in Leeds. In Rotherham the concerts draws an audience including Muslim women and young people who have never before attended a live concert. Again, the music and the message of unity that the tour is built around is a resounding success.

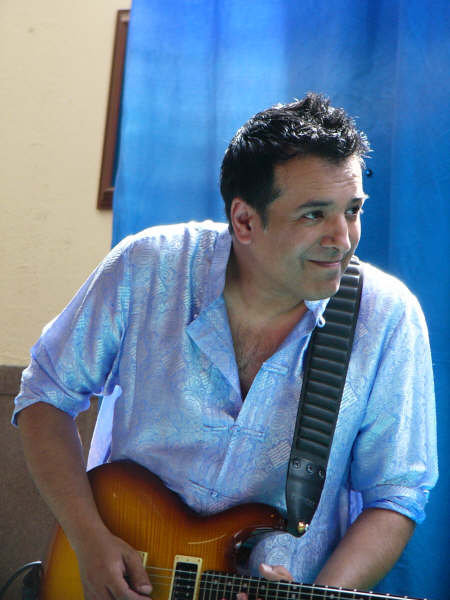
Mohammed Nazam (Creator of The Berakah Project)

== Other Work in the Community ==
Mohammed Nazam's work with Berakah led to an invitation to take part in projects based in Israel/Palestine in 2005 and 2009. In 2005 Nazam took part in music workshops with young Palestinians in the West Bank and young Israelis in Tel Aviv

In 2009 Nazam was invited to take part in a project devised by Israeli peace organisation 'Windows For Peace', and UK based production school Point Blank, which saw young Jewish Israelis and Israeli citizens of Palestinian descent working together to produce a song and an accompanying video.

Mohammed Nazam, in an interview With One Jerusalem on 16 June 2009, gives further insight into the Windows For Peace Project:

“It’s important that during challenging times like these the people and organisations who are working for peace step up a gear and show the world that there are ways of increasing understanding and crossing religious, national and cultural divides. The work that Windows for Peace are doing with Israelis and Palestinians is incredibly important and I am touched and honoured to have been asked by Robert Cowan, founder of Point Blank (Point Blank Music College), to be involved in this initiative; I absolutely believe that no matter what, hatred and war are truly not viable options."

Point Blank, is a frequent visitor to the Middle East; four years ago Robert Cowan formulated an idea for using the Point Blank training system to engage young people from Israel and Palestine and bring them together through music and film-making. Berakah Arts was wound down in 2023.

== The Berakah Players Ensemble ==
- Guitar: Mohammed Nazam
- Vocals: Chantelle Duncan
- Keyboards: Mark Hinton Stewart Violin: Serena Leader
- Previous Members
- Acoustic Bass: Eustace William
- Violin - Tanya Sweiry
- Percussion: Abdelkader Saadoun
- Acoustic Bass – Rex Horan
- Electric Bass – Richard Finch Turner
- Guests
- Cello – Shirely Smart
- Viola – Helen Sanders Hewitt
- Live Sound/Tour Managing
- Daniel McLeod
- Will Donbavand (also website, marketing and organisational support)
