= Sport in Edmonton =

Sports in Edmonton

Major League
- Number of teams: 4 (3 active)
- Number of venues: 4
- Number of championships: 20
- First team: Edmonton Eskimos (1949)

Minor League
- Number of teams: 11 (0 active)
- Number of venues: 7
- Number of championships: 11
- First team: Edmonton Legislatures (1884)

University
- University: University of Alberta, MacEwan University
- Conference: CWUAA

College
- College: NAIT, The King's University (Edmonton), Concordia University of Edmonton
- Athletic association: CCAA
- Conference: ACAA

There are a variety of sports in Edmonton played professionally, as amateurs, or recreationally.

== Sports teams ==
=== Current teams ===
Professional sports teams
Club	Type	League	Venue	Established	Championships
Edmonton Elks	Canadian football	Canadian Football League	Commonwealth Stadium	1949	15
Edmonton Oilers	Ice hockey	National Hockey League	Rogers Place	1972	5
Edmonton Stingers	Basketball	Canadian Elite Basketball League	Edmonton Expo Centre	2018	2
Edmonton Oil Kings	Ice hockey	Western Hockey League	Rogers Place	2007	2
Edmonton Riverhawks	Baseball	West Coast League	RE/MAX Field	2020	0
Edmonton Impact	Paintball	National Xball League	No home stadium	2001	1

Semi-pro, amateur and junior clubs
Club	Type	League	Venue	Established	Championships
Edmonton Huskies	Canadian football	Canadian Junior Football League	Clarke Stadium	1947	5
Edmonton Wildcats	Canadian football	Canadian Junior Football League	Clarke Stadium	1948	3
Edmonton Arctic Pride	Canadian football	Western Women's Canadian Football League	Clarke Stadium	2025	0
Edmonton BTB SC	Soccer	Alberta Premier League	Clarke Stadium	2013	0
Edmonton Scottish	Soccer	Alberta Premier League (semi-pro)	Hamish Black Field	1907	2
Edmonton Scottish	Soccer	Alberta Major Soccer League (amateur)	Hamish Black Field	1907	28

=== Baseball ===
Professional baseball in Edmonton dates back to 1884 when the Edmonton Legislatures were formed. By 1907 the team had become known as the Edmonton Grays until 1909 when it became the Edmonton Eskimos, then the Edmonton Gray Birds in 1912 and 1913 before operating again as the Eskimos in various leagues until 1961. Alongside the Eskimos were the Edmonton Drakes, Lloydminster Meridians, Edmonton Cubs, Edmonton Navy Cardinals Edmonton Dodgers and the Edmonton Oilers team which existed in 1964.

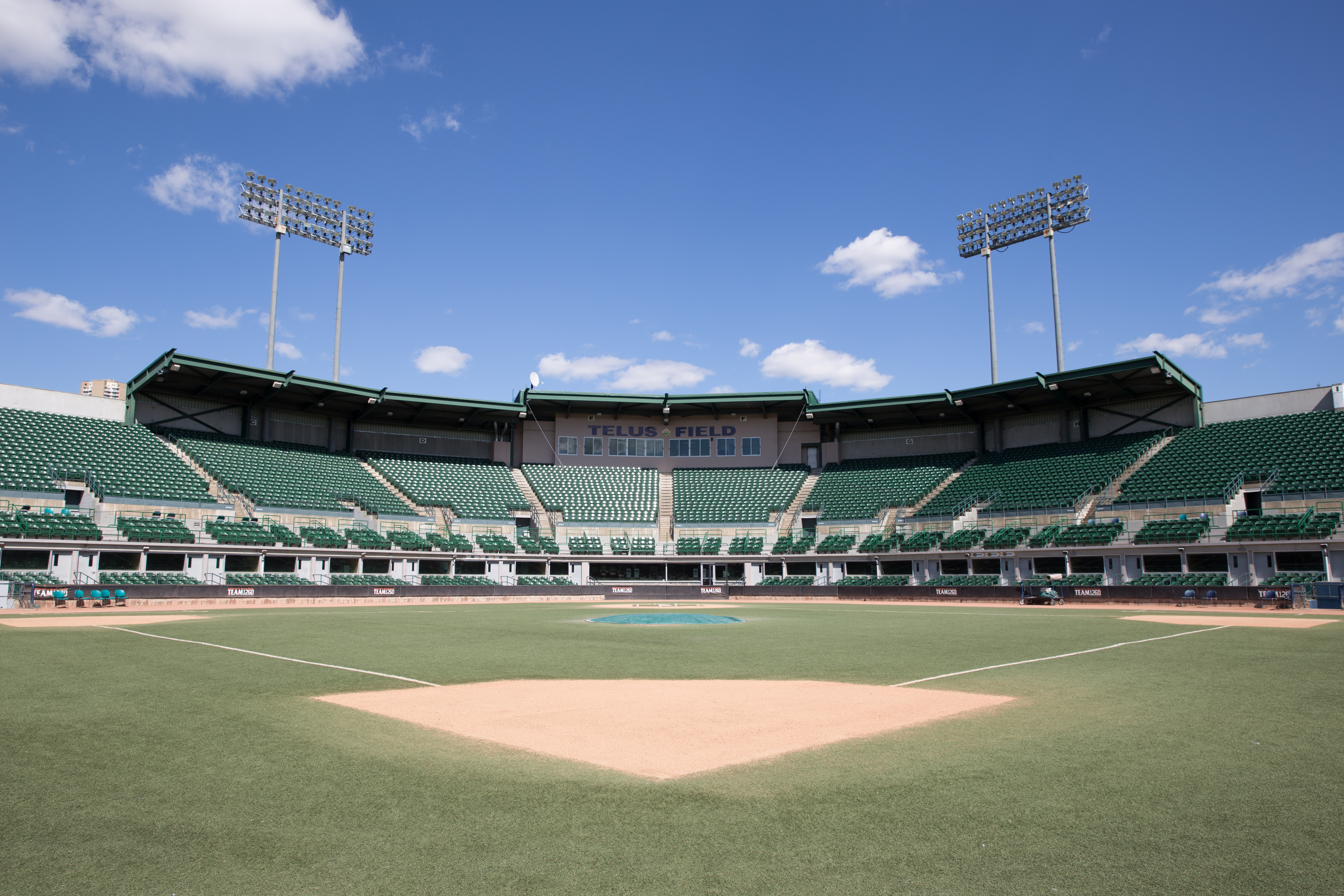
RE/MAX Field is a baseball stadium used by the Edmonton Riverhawks

Starting in 2004, Edmonton was represented in the North American League by the Edmonton Cracker-Cats who rebranded as the Edmonton Capitals in 2009 under the ownership of Daryl Katz. They suspended operations in 2011. The Edmonton Prospects operated in a summer league for collegiate players from 2012 to 2020. In 2022, the Edmonton Riverhawks collegiate baseball team played their first season as a member of the West Coast League.

As a reminder of Edmonton's baseball history, a giant metal baseball bat was erected near downtown. It was once the largest in Canada, until Saskatchewan erected a larger bat in 2014.

==== Edmonton Trappers ====
Triple-A baseball came to Edmonton in 1981 as the Edmonton Trappers began playing at John Ducey Park. The Trappers became the first Canadian AAA franchise to win a pennant, in 1984. They won three more titles, with the last in 2002 when they defeated the Salt Lake Stingers

The Trappers were affiliated with a total of six different Major League teams. The first was the Chicago White Sox, then the Anaheim Angels, Florida Marlins, Oakland Athletics, Minnesota Twins, and the Montreal Expos were the Trappers' last parent club before the two teams moved together in the same year. The Trappers also played their Major League affiliates twice in Edmonton. First the Angels played the Trappers at Commonwealth Stadium. The Athletics were the second team to play the Trappers. The A's won by a score of 9–7.

The owners were losing money even though the Trappers were doing well in attendance. Though all of the stadiums in the league were bigger than Telus Field, the Trappers finished 10th out of the 16 teams in attendance. In 2005, the team was sold and moved to Texas.

Many MLB players played with the Trappers. These players included Miguel Tejada, Randy Knorr, Jason Giambi and many others. The Trappers sent over 500 players to the MLB.

=== Basketball ===
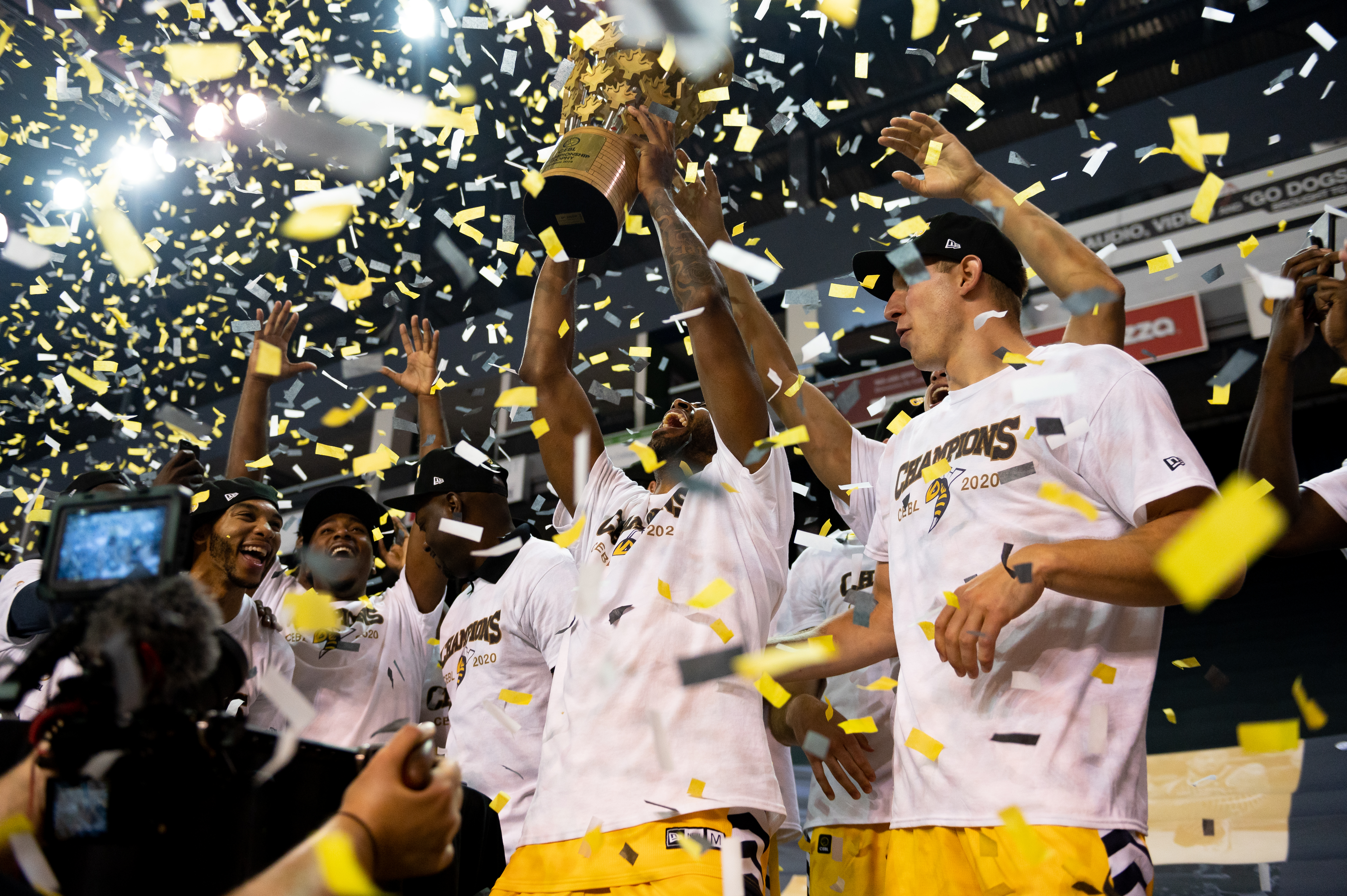
The Stingers celebrate their first CEBL championship in 2020

The Edmonton Stingers began play in 2019 as a founding team of the Canadian Elite Basketball League. The team has won 2 CEBL Championships, back to back titles in 2020 and 2021. Edmonton has previously been home to the Edmonton Skyhawks of the National Basketball League (Canada), and the Edmonton Energy of the International Basketball League.

=== Canadian football ===
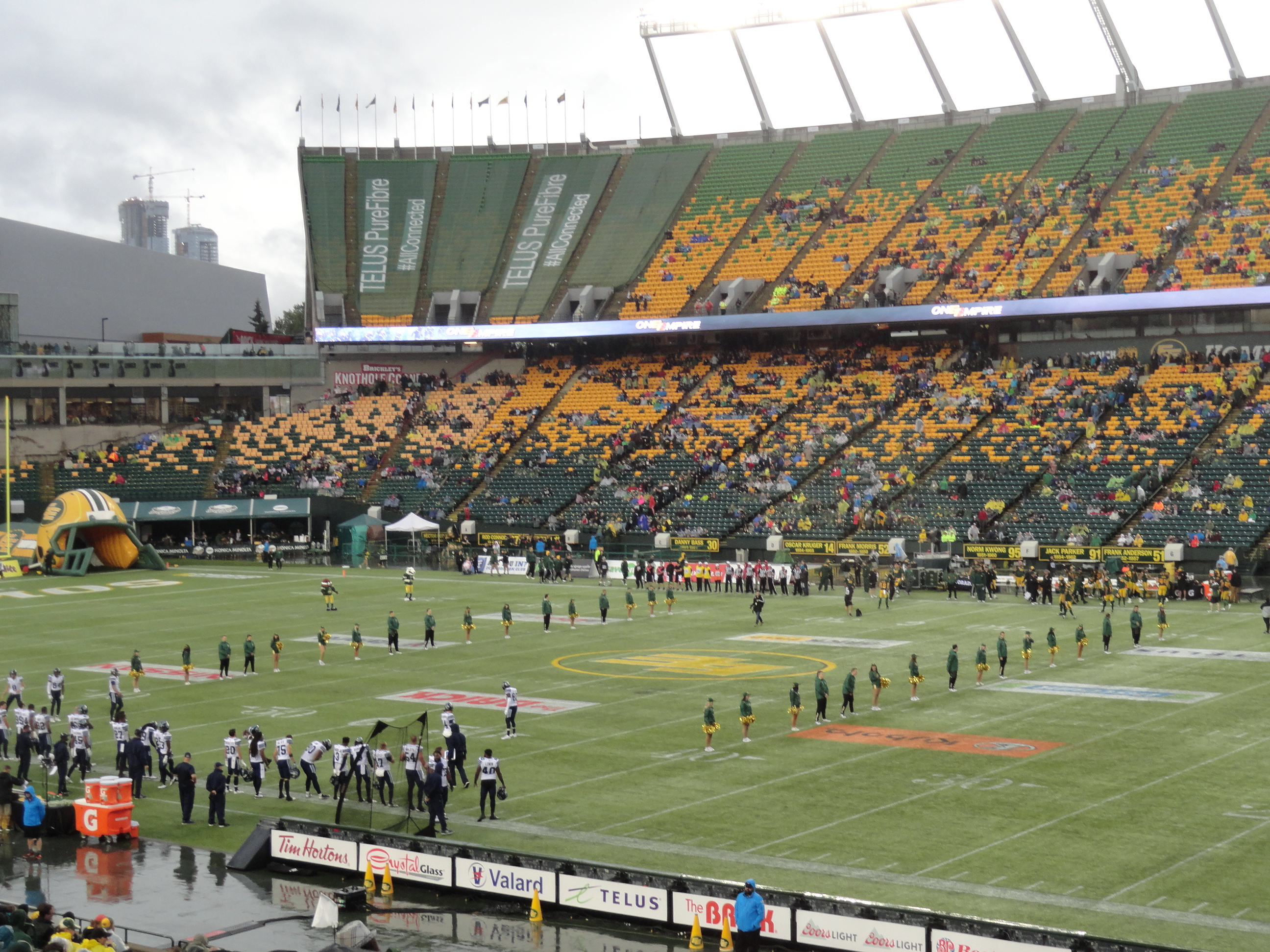
Commonwealth Stadium during a 2018 game between the Edmonton Eskimos (later renamed the Elks) and the Toronto Argonauts

Commonwealth Stadium is home to the Edmonton Elks of the Canadian Football League. The Elks hold the North American pro sports record for most consecutive playoff appearances (34 consecutive seasons) and have won the Grey Cup (the CFL championship trophy) 15 times since 1949. They are one of only four teams to win the Grey Cup after finishing third in their division in the regular season (the others being the B.C. Lions, the Saskatchewan Roughriders and the Montreal Alouettes).

In addition to the Elks, Edmonton is host to two Canadian Junior Football League teams, the Edmonton Huskies and the Edmonton Wildcats, and a Western Women's Canadian Football League team, the Edmonton Arctic Pride.

=== Ice hockey ===
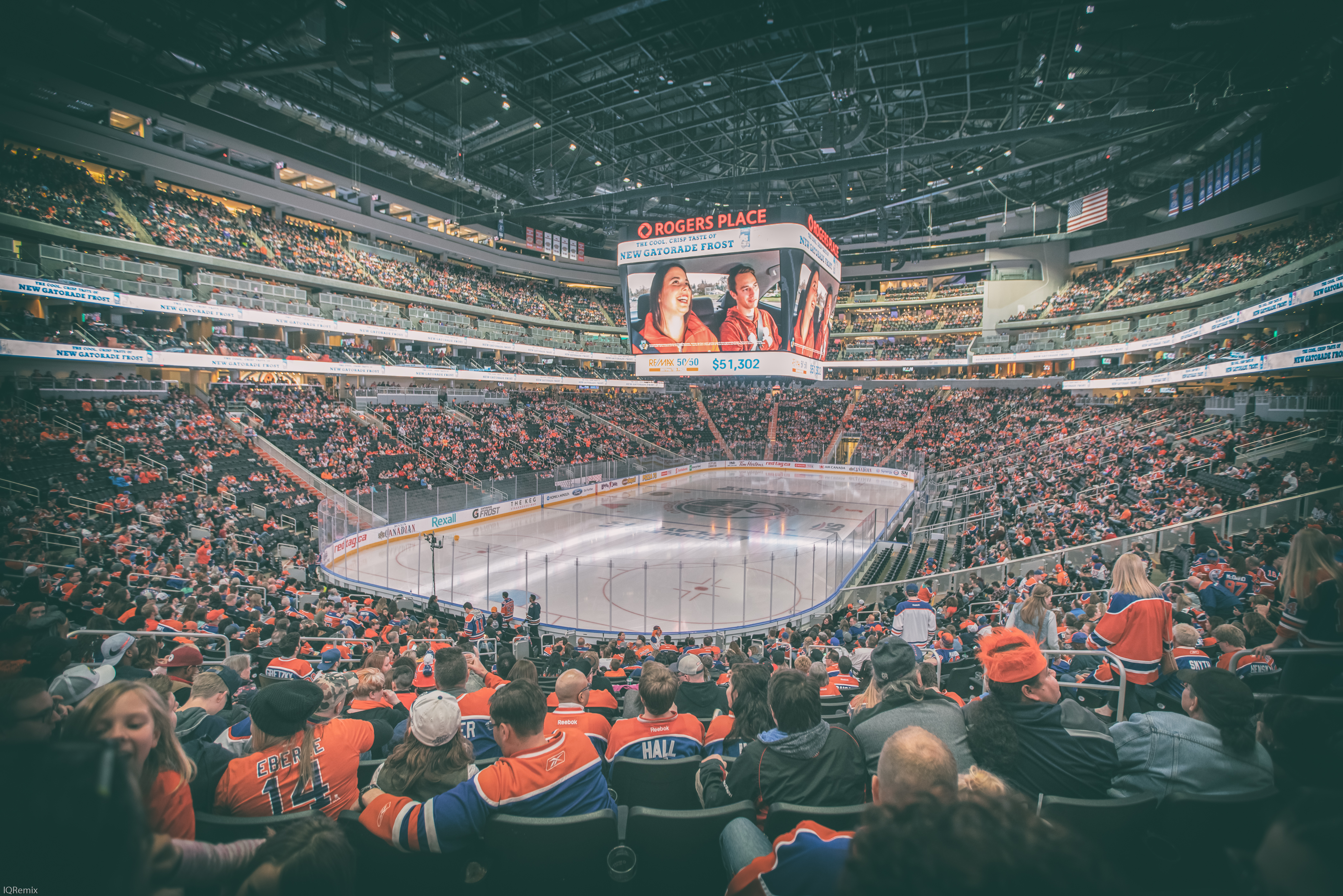
Fans inside Rogers Place prior to a game between the Edmonton Oilers and San Jose Sharks

The Edmonton Oilers, originally one of the founding franchises of the World Hockey Association, joined the National Hockey League in 1979. They quickly became one of the best teams in the league, winning five Stanley Cup championships in 1984, 1985, 1987, 1988 and 1990. Wayne Gretzky, considered by many to be the greatest ice hockey player ever, played with the Edmonton Oilers from 1979 to 1988.

The Oilers did not return to the Stanley Cup Final until 2006 when they lost to the Carolina Hurricanes in seven games. Despite losing, they were the first eighth-seeded team to make it that far, and nearly came back to win from deficits of 2–0 and 3–1 in the series.The Oilers later reached the Stanley Cup Final in 2024 and 2025, losing both times to the Florida Panthers.

Rogers Place has been the home of the Edmonton Oilers since 2016.

Edmonton's involvement in hockey is not limited to the Edmonton Oilers. Several big-time NHL names come from Edmonton and the surrounding area, such as Mike Comrie, Jarome Iginla, Ray Whitney and Fernando Pisani. Edmonton was granted a WHL expansion team, the Edmonton Oil Kings, which began playing in the 2007–2008 season.

=== Ringette ===
Edmonton is the only Canadian city with two teams in the semi-professional National Ringette League. The Edmonton WAM!, established in 2004, have won four national titles, including the 2023 national championship. The Edmonton Black Gold Rush are a newer team, having been established in 2015.

=== Soccer ===
FC Edmonton was a soccer club that was established in 2010, having initially played in the North American Soccer League. FC Edmonton went into hiatus after the NASL folded, before joining the newly formed Canadian Premier League in 2018. The team played its home games at Clarke Stadium. The club folded in 2022. As of 2024, Edmonton has four teams in the Alberta Premier League: Edmonton BTB SC and Edmonton Scottish each field a men's side and a women's side.

=== Former teams ===
Edmonton was home to the Edmonton Grads, a women's basketball team with the best win–loss record of any North American team to date. The Grads defeated most American, European and Olympic challengers and compiled a record of 502 wins vs. 20 losses over 25 years, from 1915 until they disbanded in 1940 at the outbreak of the Second World War.

The Edmonton Flyers were a men's ice hockey team from 1939 to 1941, and from 1945 to 1963. Starting as a senior amateur team, in 1951 they became a professional minor league team for the Detroit Red Wings. Many NHLers played at one time for the Flyers, including future Hockey Hall of Fame members Al Arbour, Johnny Bucyk, Glenn Hall, Vic Stasiuk, and Norm Ullman. Coach and General Manager Bud Poile was named to the Hall of Fame as a builder.

The Edmonton Drillers were a member of the professional North American Soccer League from 1979 to 1982. They played their outdoor games in Commonwealth Stadium and their indoor games in Northlands Coliseum. They also won game one of their 1981 indoor final in the Edmonton Gardens, going on to win the championship in Chicago.

From 2006 to 2015, the Edmonton Rush franchise played in the National Lacrosse League. Home games were at Rexall Place. The team became the Saskatchewan Rush in 2015.

Venues

The Edmonton Gardens was Edmonton's first indoor arena, built in 1913 and demolished in 1982. It was home to many amateur and professional sports teams.

Clarke Stadium is an outdoor stadium built in 1938, and home to Edmonton's CFL team from 1949 to 1978.

The Edmonton Coliseum, later known as Northlands Coliseum, was an indoor arena that hosted professional hockey as well as other sporting and entertainment events. It opened in 1974.

Edmonton has an outdoor velodrome called the Argyll Velodrome. An indoor velodrome is being built as part of the Coronation Park Sports and Recreation Centre with the hopes of it hosting national and international cycling events.

== Sporting events ==
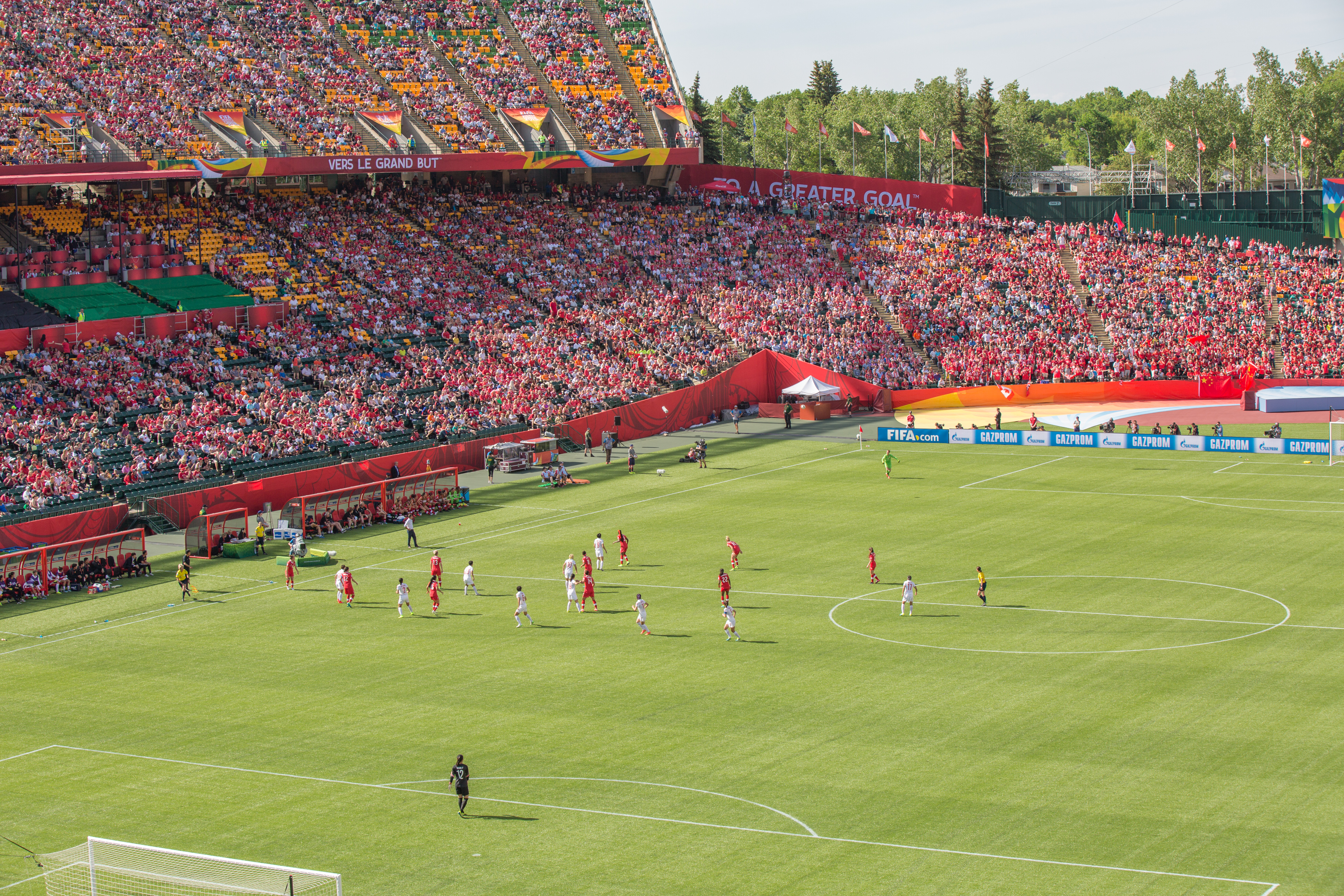
Game between the Canadian and Chinese soccer teams during the 2015 FIFA Women's World Cup

A number of sporting events were held in Edmonton, including the 1978 Commonwealth Games, the 1983 Summer Universiade, the 2001 World Championships in Athletics, the 2001 World Marathon Cup, the 2005 IAAF World Half Marathon Championships, and the 2005 World Masters Games.

In 2002 Edmonton hosted the inaugural U20 FIFA Women's World Championship, known then as the U19 tournament. It drew over 47,000 spectators to the final between Canada and the United States. Edmonton hosted soccer matches during the 2015 FIFA Women's World Cup and was a major candidate to host matches during the 2026 FIFA World Cup. Commonwealth Stadium also hosted some of the games in the 2007 FIFA U-20 World Cup.

From 2005 to 2012 Edmonton also had a circuit on the Indy Car Series known as the Edmonton Indy. This event was the best-attended event in the series. The city was also home to Chris Benoit, a World Wrestling Entertainment (WWE) World Heavyweight Champion.

From August 31 to September 17, 2006, Edmonton hosted the Women's Rugby World Cup with 12 international teams taking part for the title.
