= John Ducey Park =

Former baseball stadium in Edmonton, Alberta

- Location in Edmonton
- Former names: Renfrew Park
- Address: 10233 96 Avenue; Edmonton, Alberta; Canada
- Coordinates: 53°31′54″N 113°29′48″W
- Owner: City of Edmonton
- Capacity: 6,500
- Type: Baseball stadium

Construction
- Opened: 1933
- Demolished: 1995

Tenants
- Edmonton Cubs, Edmonton Dodgers, Edmonton Drakes, Edmonton Navy Cardinals, Edmonton Eskimos, Edmonton Trappers

John Ducey Park was a 6,500-seat baseball park in Edmonton, Alberta, Canada. It was originally known as "Renfrew Park" and was built in 1933. Named after Lord Renfrew, the park was originally a soccer pitch until Clarence Campbell brought baseball to. Prior to Renfrew Park, Diamond Park was Edmonton's primary baseball park.

The first game was played at Renfrew Park on May 24, 1933. A fire in August 1950 briefly shut down the baseball park, when it was replaced by a steel grandstand. The new park became home to the Edmonton Trappers in 1981, who won three Pacific Coast League championships. On March 13, 1984, Renfrew Park was renamed for John Ducey, an Edmonton baseball executive, coach and umpire. The park hosted the 1990 Baseball World Cup.

John Ducey Park was torn down in 1995, and replaced by Telus Field (later known as RE/MAX Field) built on the same location.
