= John Ducey (baseball) =

Canadian baseball executive and umpire (1908–1983)

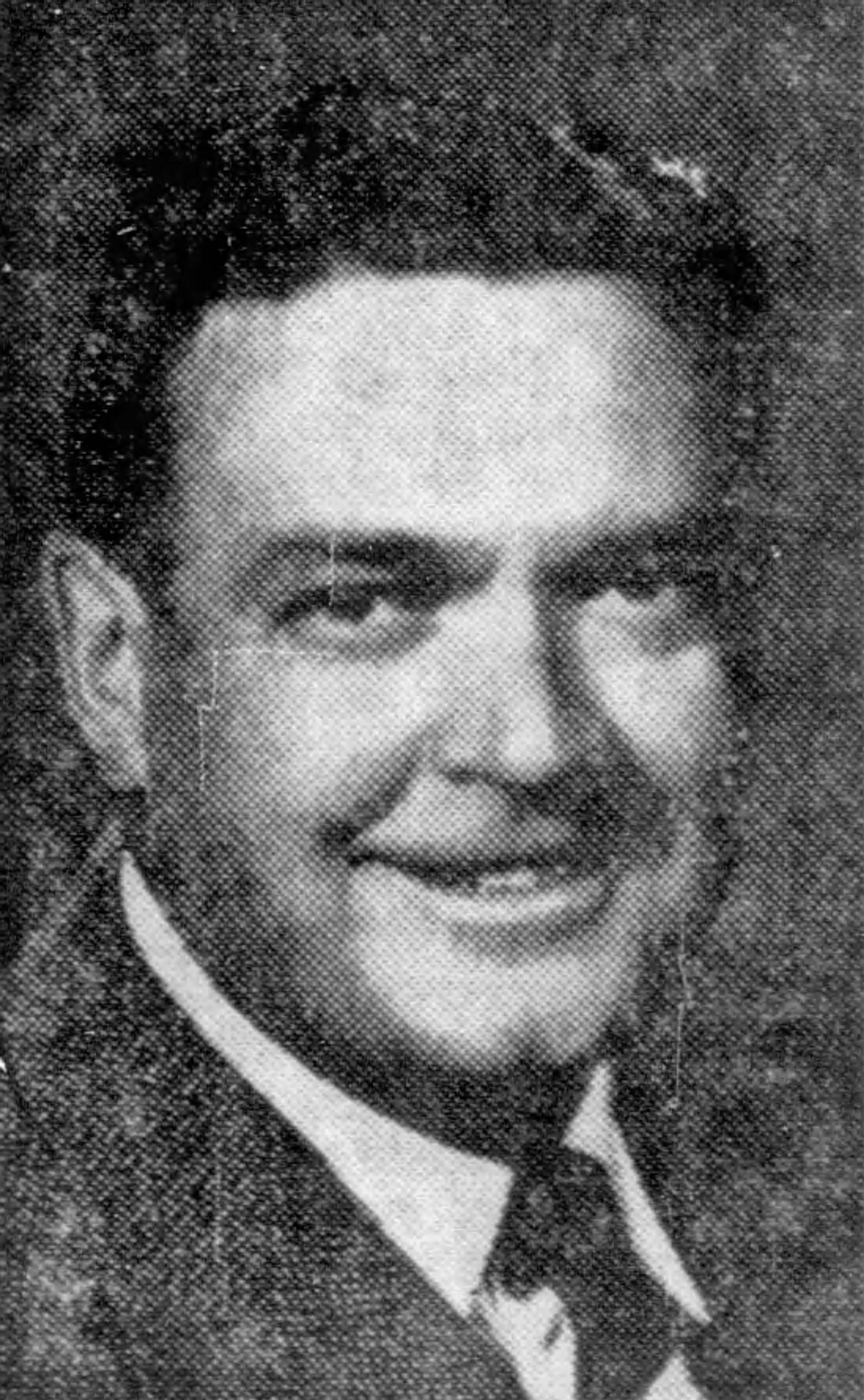
- Ducey c. 1966
- Born: August 31, 1908; Buffalo, New York, US
- Died: September 11, 1983 (aged 75); Edmonton, Alberta, Canada
- Resting place: Holy Cross Cemetery
- Occupations: Real estate agent; Insurance agent
- Known for: Baseball executive and umpire
- Awards: Alberta Sports Hall of Fame (1980); Canadian Baseball Hall of Fame (1983)

John Eugene Ducey (August 31, 1908 – September 11, 1983) was a Canadian baseball executive and umpire. He operated the semi-professional Edmonton Eskimos baseball team from 1946 to 1959, and was briefly their manager. He organized the Alberta Senior Amateur Baseball League until the 1950 season, transferred the Eskimos into the Western International League, then organized the Western Canada Baseball League in 1955, which later became the Canadian-American Baseball League. In 1964, he was a co-founder of the Edmonton Oldtimers Baseball Association to recognize the city's baseball history.

Beginning in baseball as a bat boy and playing amateur baseball in Edmonton, he umpired for fifteen seasons including time in the Northern Professional Baseball League. He was briefly a sportswriter for the Edmonton Bulletin, and worked winters in public relations for hockey and managing arenas in the United States, and the Edmonton Junior Hockey League. He was twice Edmonton's "Sportsman of the Year", was inducted into the Edmonton Sports Hall of Fame, the Alberta Sports Hall of Fame, and the Canadian Baseball Hall of Fame. Edmonton's stadium was renamed John Ducey Park after his death.

== Early life and family ==
John Eugene Ducey was born on August 31, 1908, in Buffalo, New York, the son of Thomas and Mary Ducey. Ducey's father was originally from Lindsay, Ontario, lived in Alberta in 1906, then briefly in Buffalo by 1908, and returned to Alberta in 1909. He had Irish heritage, and worked on the New York Central Railroad, before relocating to work in real estate. The family lived alternately between Edmonton and Strathcona, until remaining in Edmonton since 1914.

In baseball, Ducey was a bat boy at Diamond Park for the visiting teams playing against the Edmonton Eskimos in the Western Canada League in 1921 and 1922. While an altar boy at St. Joseph's Cathedral, he arranged baseball games between Catholic parishes in Edmonton in a church league, while playing as a pitcher and a first baseman. In Canadian football, he was an assistant clubhouse boy for the Edmonton Eskimos who were Grey Cup finalists in 1921 and 1922. He attended elementary school in Edmonton, then enrolled at St. Mary's High School in 1923.

== Sporting career ==
Ducey was a first baseman in Edmonton's amateur baseball league for the Yeomans at Diamond Park from 1925 to 1929, and for the Imperials at Boyle Street Park in the 1930 season. Travelling to Los Angeles to attend a baseball umpire school, he was taught by Major League Baseball umpire Beans Reardon. Ducey was an ice hockey reporter for the Hollywood News during that winter, then a sportswriter for the Edmonton Bulletin in 1931 and 1932.

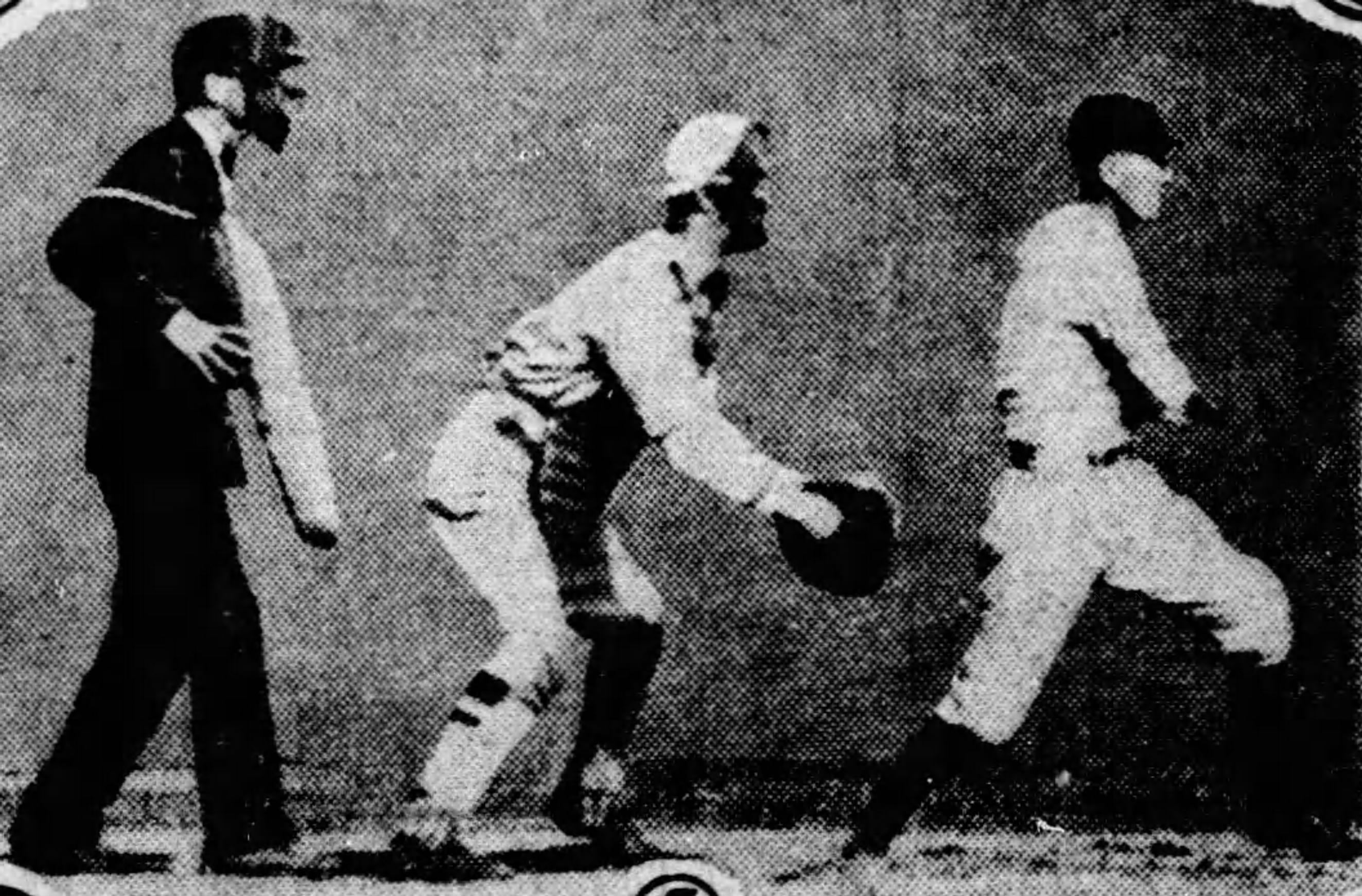
Ducey (left) umpiring in 1933

After umpiring his first game on June 28, 1931, Ducey worked regularly in Edmonton's senior baseball league. On May 24, 1933, he umpired the first game played at the newly opened Renfrew Park. Following four seasons umpiring in Alberta, he accepted a post with the Northern Professional Baseball League in 1934. Returning to Edmonton by 1938, he umpired there until 1941, when he spent summers umpiring in Springfield, Massachusetts. He was offered a contract for the 1944 All-American Girls Professional Baseball League season, but declined then retired from umpiring after the 1945 season.

From 1938 and 1941, Ducey was an arena manager in Hollywood, San Francisco, and Springfield. Working for Eddie Shore from 1941 to 1944, Ducey was a manager for the Springfield Indians and Buffalo Bisons. He managed the Eastern States Coliseum from 1941 to 1943, then did public relations for the Buffalo Bisons in the 1943–44 season. He subsequently managed the Buffalo Memorial Auditorium for the 1944-45 season.

In 1945, the Edmonton Junior Hockey League hired Ducey as a public relations director to promote junior ice hockey while senior ice hockey was growing. Ducey and Art Potter planned a "Bob Carse night", to honour a local player who was a recent prisoner of war, and to recognize other junior hockey players who died during World War II. The junior league suspended operations after the season, replaced by a city league including senior, intermediate and junior hockey teams.

=== Baseball executive ===
Ducey subsequently switched his focus to baseball in Edmonton, where he organized leagues and teams, scouted baseball players, and occasionally managed baseball teams. He also collaborated with USC Trojans baseball coach Rod Dedeaux, to bring former college players to Alberta.

In 1946, Ducey and business partners leased Renfrew Park and assumed operation of Edmonton's semi-professional three-team league. Ducey managed the Edmonton Eskimos during the league's 1946 season. The league added a team in Calgary for the 1947 season, and operated as the Alberta Senior Amateur Baseball League until the 1950 season. Ducey became majority owner of the Edmonton Eskimos in 1951, and searched for a new league to join. During the 1953 and 1954 season, the Eskimos played in the Western International League.

Searching for another league, Ducey joined forces with teams from Saskatoon and North Battleford. In 1955, he organized the semi-professional Western Canada Baseball League, which later became the Canadian-American Baseball League. In the 1957 season, the Eskimos' roster included four USC Trojans alumni including future Major League player Ron Fairly. The Eskimos were Canadian champions that season, and placed second to Japan at the 1957 Global Series in Detroit.

In 1959, Ducey declined to purchase the Pacific Coast League franchise rights to the Sacramento Solons–an independent team without financial assistance as a Major League farm team. He stated that Renfrew Park required many upgrades and double its spectator capacity, and that Sunday sporting events needed be legalized in Alberta. When the Canadian-American Baseball League collapsed following the 1959 season, Ducey ceased operation of the Eskimos instead of joining a new semi-professional league without a team based in Calgary. He continued advocating for Sunday baseball, and pushed for domed multi-purpose stadiums to resurrect professional baseball in Alberta.

In 1964, Ducey was a co-founder and the first secretary of the Edmonton Oldtimers Baseball Association, which sought a hall of fame and recognition to those involved in baseball. Using connections in baseball, Ducey grew the association to 119 members by 1965, including 20 former major league players. In 1967, the association began honouring baseball persons during annual dinners at the Hotel Macdonald.

== Personal life ==
Ducey was a sales representative for Motor Car Supply Company sports equipment from 1933 to 1937, and later for CCM sports. Moving to Springfield in 1941, he was a guard at the Bosch Magneto Company and a United States military police civilian auxiliary officer. Returning to Edmonton in 1943, he worked in personnel management for an American company involved in the Alaska Highway construction. After World War II, he was a full-time commercial real estate agent and property insurance agent until 1974.

Ducey married Grace Mungall on July 13, 1935, with whom he had a daughter and a son. Their son Brant, was also a journalist, earning degrees at University of Oregon. After a lengthy illness, Ducey died in Edmonton on September 11, 1983. Following his funeral at St. Joseph's Cathedral, he was interred at Holy Cross Cemetery.

== Honours and legacy ==
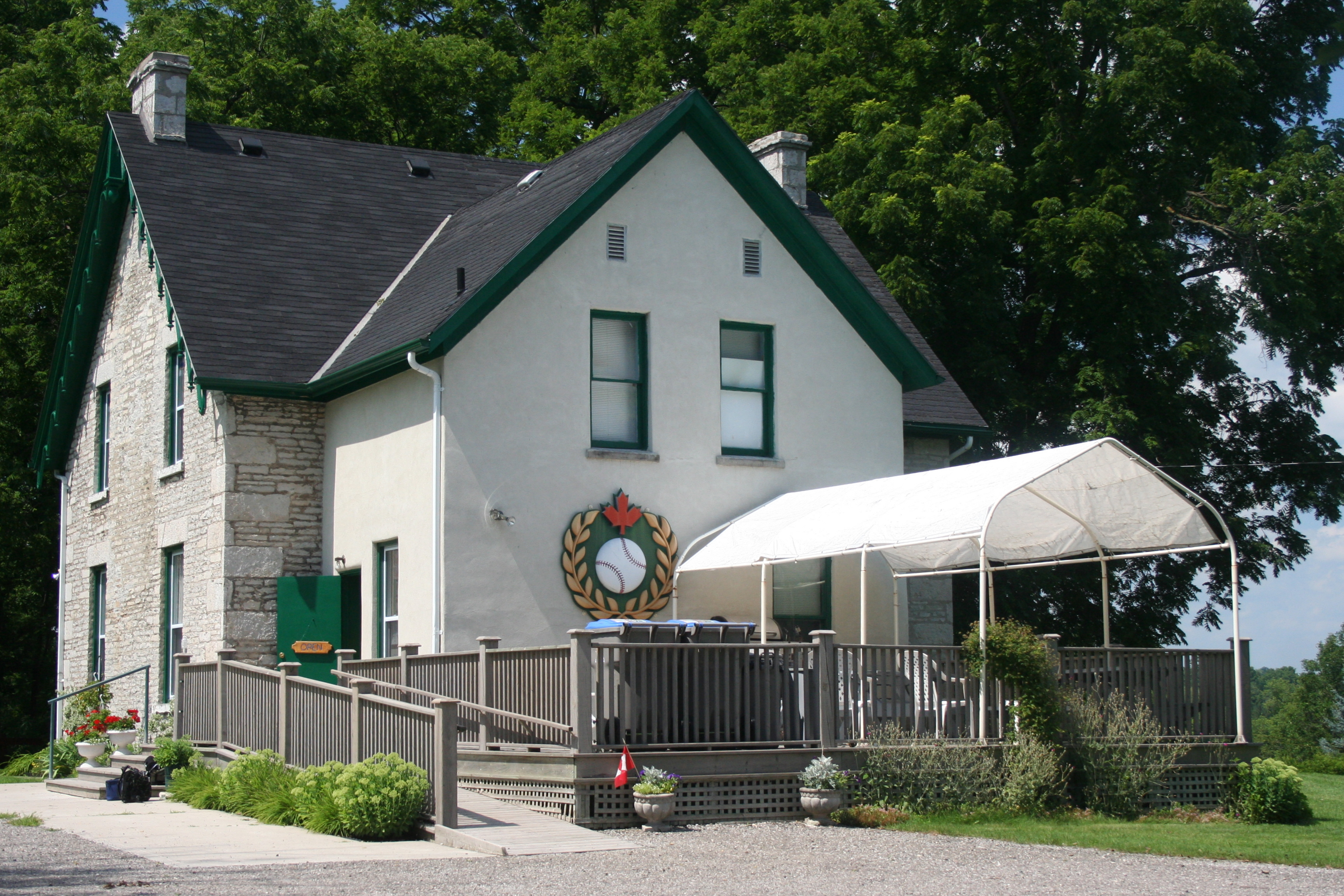
The Canadian Baseball Hall of Fame building, c. 2010

Ducey was known in Edmonton as "Mr. Baseball", the "Rajah of Renfrew", and "Lefty". He was named Edmonton's "Sportsman of the Year" in 1954 and 1957, and was inducted into the Edmonton Sports Hall of Fame in 1972. He was inducted into the builder category of the Alberta Sports Hall of Fame in 1980, and was one of the first six honourees of Canadian Baseball Hall of Fame, when inducted into the builder category as an umpire on August 3, 1983.

When the Edmonton Trappers were established in 1981, Ducey threw the ceremonial first pitch and received two lifetime seats behind home plate from team owner Peter Pocklington. Renfrew Park was renamed John Ducey Park on March 13, 1984, as the home park of the Trappers when they won three Pacific Coast League championships. John Ducey Park was replaced by Telus Field in 1995, built on the same location. In 1997, Edmonton renamed the road adjacent to the ballpark, John Ducey Way.

The Rajah of Renfrew, a book published in 1998 by his son Brant, chronicles the life of Ducey.
