= Lindale High School =

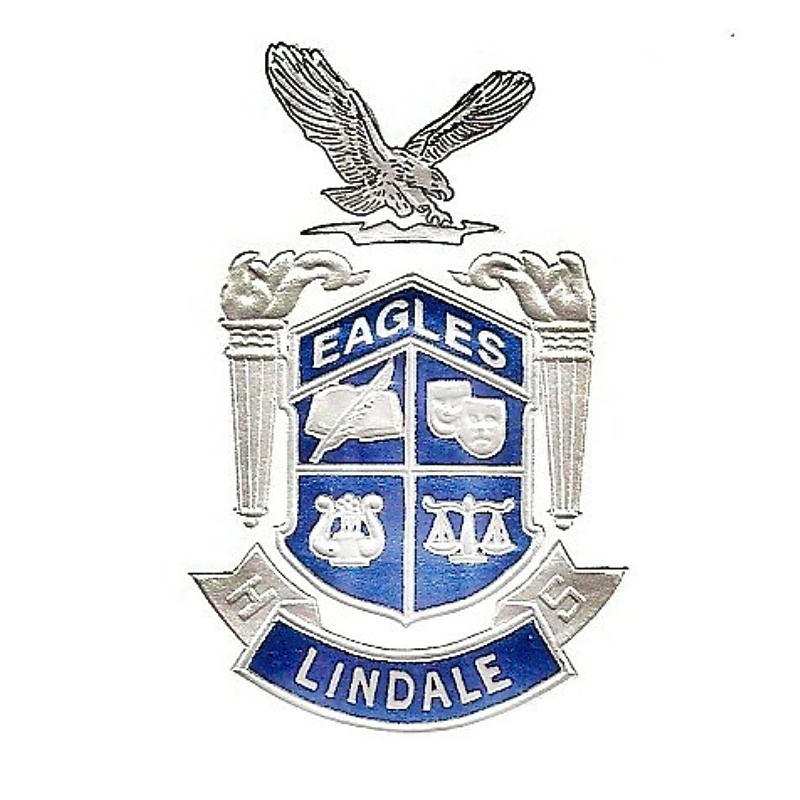

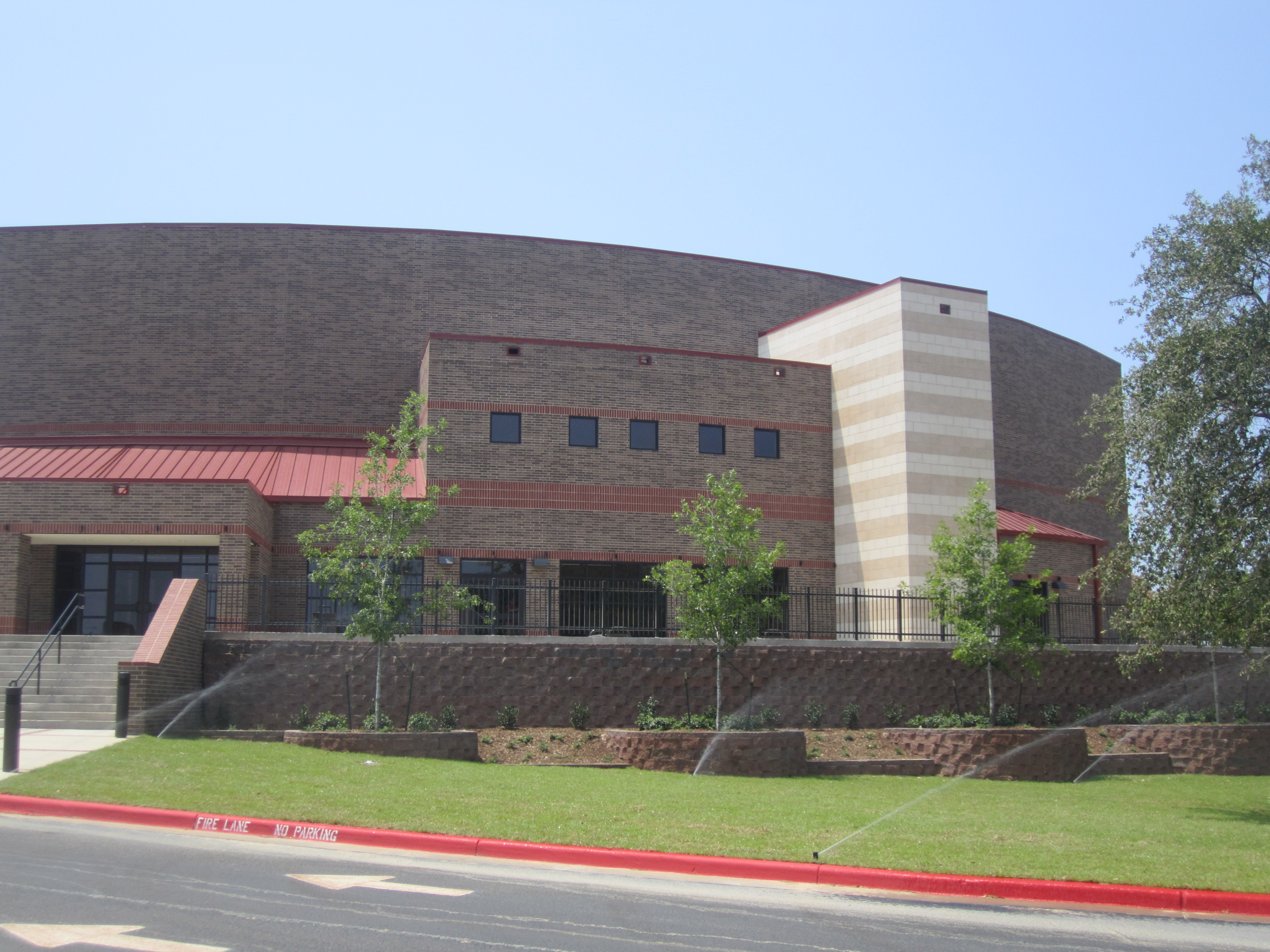

Location
- 920 East Hubbard Street; Lindale, Texas 75771; United States; 32°30′52″N 95°23′48″W

Information
- Type: Co-Educational, Comprehensive Public High School, Secondary
- Motto: "A Tradition of Excellence"
- School district: Lindale Independent School District
- Superintendent: Stan Surratt
- Principal: Kyle Wright
- Teaching staff: 92.70 (on full-time equivalent (FTE) basis)
- Grades: 9–12
- Enrollment: 1,289 (2023–2024)
- Student to teacher ratio: 13.91
- Colors: Blue, white, and black
- Athletics conference: UIL 4A
- Nickname: Eagles
- Newspaper: The Eagle Eye
- Website: Lindale High School

Lindale High School (also called Lindale High, LHS or simply Lindale) is a public secondary school located in the Northeast Texas town of Lindale. Lindale High is a part of the Lindale Independent School District and includes grades 9 through 12. The school serves most of Lindale and nearby Hideaway Lake. A small portion of eastern Van Zandt County also lies within the district.

== Extracurricular activities ==
=== Academics ===
==== State Titles ====
1976 Chip Arnold and Glen Patrick ‐ debate

=== Athletics ===
The Lindale Eagles compete in the following athletics:

Cross Country, Volleyball, Football, Basketball (men's and women's), Powerlifting, Marching Band, Soccer, Golf, Tennis, Track, Softball & Baseball.

==== State Titles ====
- Boys Golf -
  - 1995(3A)
- Boys Track and Field
  - 2025(4A)
- Softball -
  - 2004(3A)
- Military Marching Band -
  - 2020(4A)
  - 2021(4A)
  - 2022(4A)
  - 2023(4A)
  - 2024(4A)

==== Individual State Titles ====
  - 1979 Mike Lang (high jump) ‐ boys' track and field
  - 1980 Mike Lang (high jump) ‐ boys' track and field

== Notable alumni ==
- Wally Brewster, former US ambassador
- Miranda Lambert, Grammy Award-winning country music recording artist
- Pat Mahomes, professional baseball player
- Kelli Finglass, Dallas Cowboys Cheerleaders
- Nash Walters, professional baseball player
