= Edmonton Grays =

1907 minor league baseball team in Edmonton

- (1907); Edmonton, Alberta

Minor league affiliations
- Class: Class D (1907)
- League: Western Canada League (1907)

Minor league titles
- League titles: None

Team data
- Ballpark: Diamond Park (1907)

The Edmonton Grays were a minor league baseball team that played in Edmonton, Alberta. They played a single season in the Western Canada League in 1907. They finished second of four teams in the league, with a 50-35 record, 5.5 games behind the league champion Medicine Hat Hatters. Frank Gray served as the team's owner and namesake, and pushed to have Diamond Park built for the team.

The WCL folded after the season, so 1907 was the team's only year of existence. A new Edmonton team, the Edmonton Eskimos, would play in a reformed Western Canada League beginning in 1909.

The Grays were the second baseball team in Edmonton, after the Edmonton Legislatures.
