= Tyler Junior College =

Community college in Tyler, Texas, U.S.

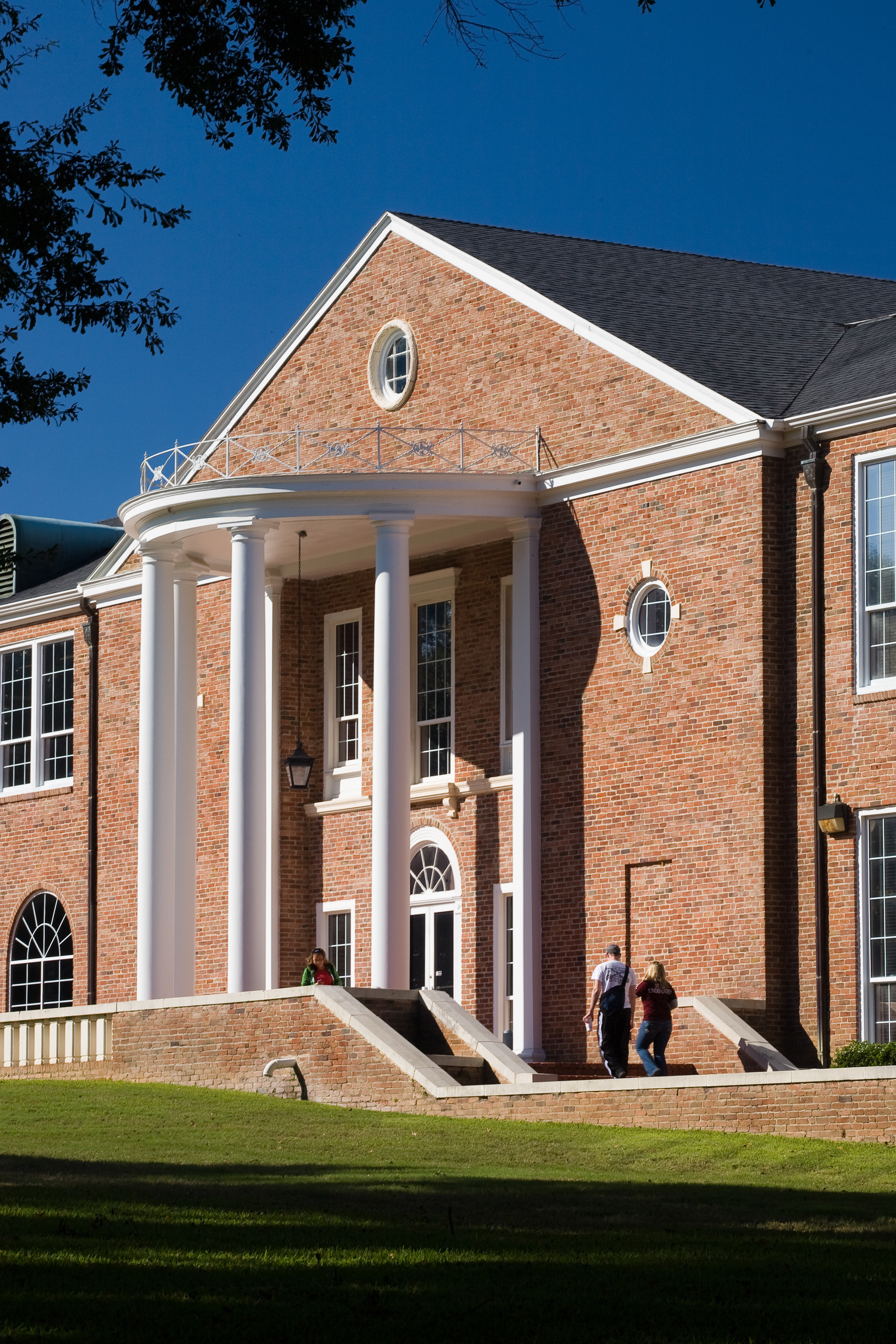
- Jenkins Hall, located on the main campus
- Motto: Educating everyone — the path to a better world.
- Type: Public community college
- Established: 1926
- Endowment: $97.1 million (2024)
- President: Juan E. Mejia
- Provost: Deana K. Sheppard
- Students: 12,500+
- Location: Tyler, Texas, United States; 32.3353°N 95.2841°W
- Campus: Urban, 145 acres
- Colors: Black & Gold
- Nickname: Apaches
- Mascot: Harry the Hawk
- Website: www.tjc.edu

Tyler Junior College (TJC) is a public community college in Tyler, Texas. It is one of the largest community colleges in the state, with an enrollment of more than 12,000 credit students and an additional 20,000 continuing education enrollments annually. Its West campus includes continuing education and workforce training programs and TJC North in Lindale, Texas offers general education classes, nursing programs, and the veterinary technician associate of applied science. The college also operates locations in Jacksonville and Rusk. TJC offers Associate of Science, Associate of Applied Science and Associate of Arts, specialized baccalaureate degrees, and certificate programs.

== History ==
The college operated as part of the Tyler public school system from its inception in 1926 until 1945, when voters supported the creation of an independent Tyler Junior College District. The junior college district now includes the Tyler, Chapel Hill, Grand Saline, Lindale, Van, and Winona school districts.

== Campus ==
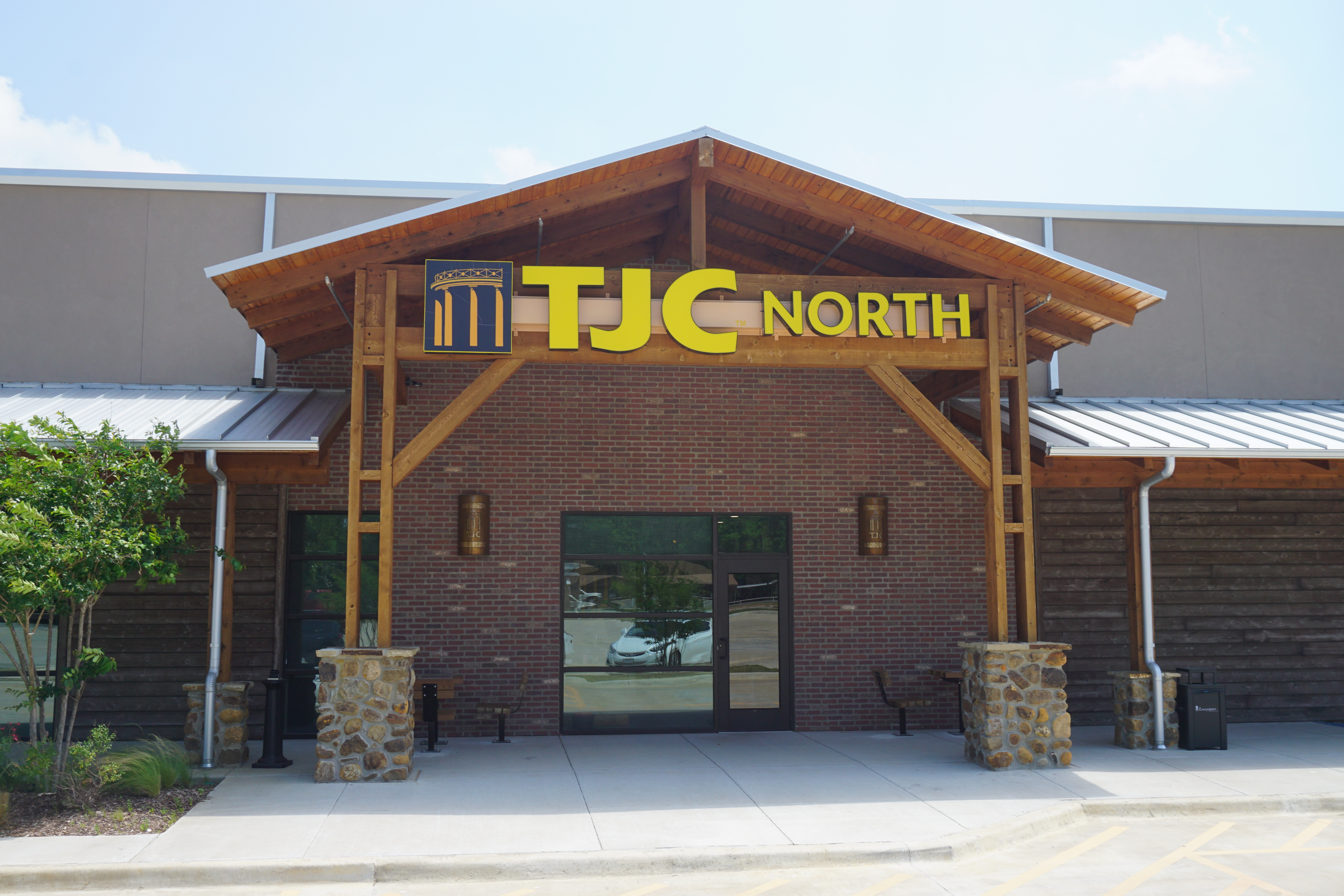
TJC North in Lindale

The independently operated Tyler Museum of Art is located on the school's main campus. The Earth and Space Science Center has a planetarium and exhibit hall offering public shows in its 40-foot (12 m)-diameter domed theater every day except Mondays, and sponsors a monthly astronomy lecture series. Additionally, Wagstaff Gymnasium is home to the TJC Apache volleyball and basketball teams.

Co-ed residence halls include Louise H. & Joseph Z. Ornelas Residential Complex, Crossroads, and Bateman Hall. Vaughn Hall houses women and Holley Hall is for men. Claridge Hall is co-ed for athletes. Sledge Hall houses members of female athletic teams, and Hudnall Hall houses members of the football team.

== Athletics ==
The college competes in the National Junior College Athletic Association's Region XIV with soccer, football, basketball, baseball, tennis, and golf teams (men) and softball, volleyball, soccer, basketball, tennis, and golf teams (women). Tyler Junior College athletes have won 70 national junior college championships. Since 2000, championships include: women's basketball in 2000 and 2022; men's baseball in 2007, 2014, 2015, 2016, 2017 and 2021; men's golf in 2003 and 2008; men's soccer in 2009, 2010, 2012, 2014, 2016 and 2017; women's soccer in 2009, 2011, 2017, 2019 and 2021; men's tennis in 2002, 2003, 2004, 2010, 2013, 2018, 2019 and 2021; and women's tennis in 2000, 2001, 2002, 2005, 2010, 2011, 2012, 2013, 2017, 2018, 2021 and 2022.

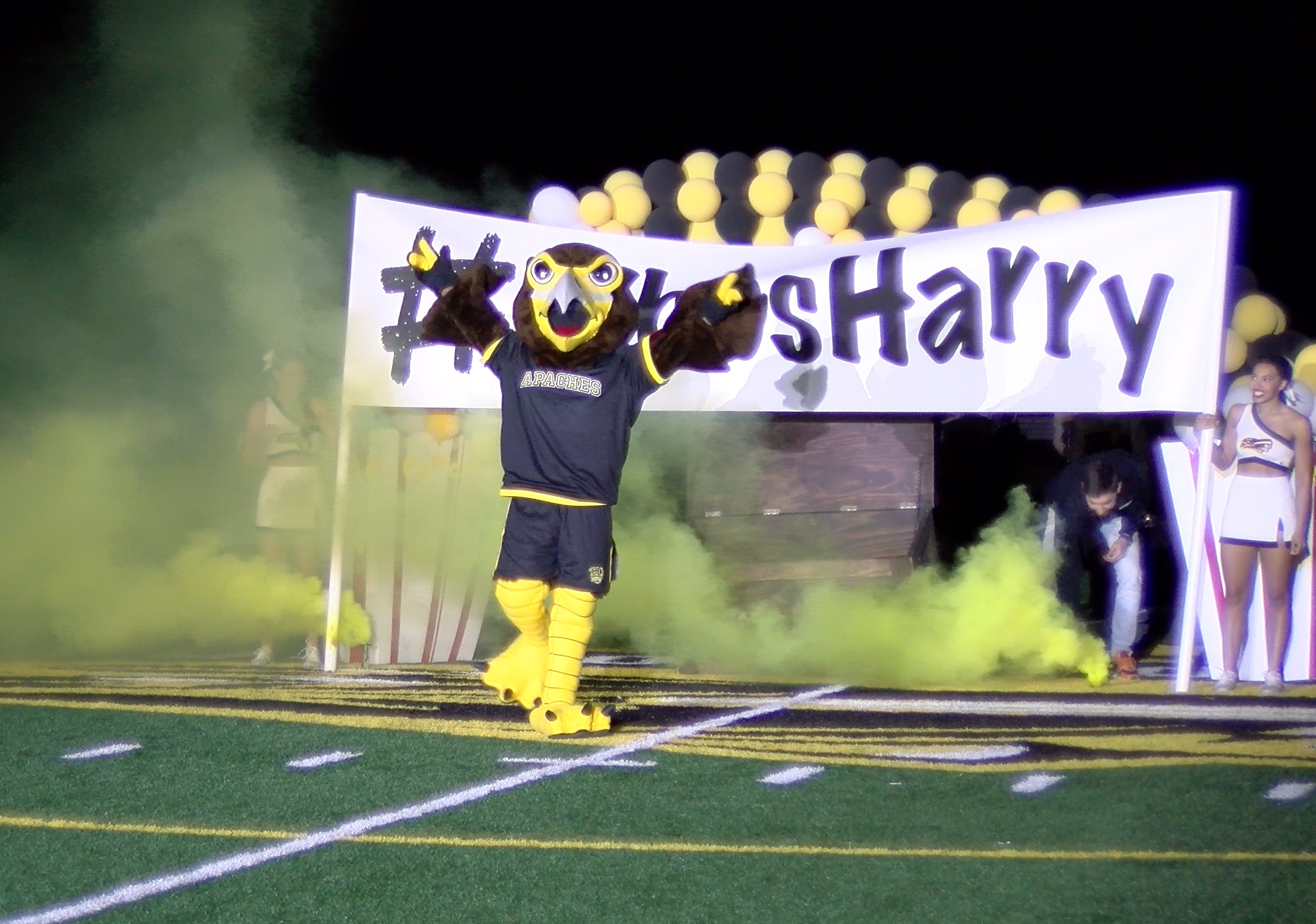
Harry the Hawk debuts during Homecoming 2022

In October 2022, TJC debuted its new mascot, Harry the Hawk. He is a Harris's Hawk.

== Notable alumni ==
- Derick Armstrong, professional football player
- Mitch Berger, professional football player
- Wally Brewster, US Ambassador to the Dominican Republic 2013- 2017
- Jimmy Butler, professional basketball player
- Quincy Butler, professional football player
- Earl Dotson, professional football player
- Dom Dwyer, professional soccer player
- Robert Ferguson, former college coach
- Daniel E. Garcia, Bishop of the Diocese of Austin
- John Harvey - professional football player
- Bill Herchman, professional football player
- Bryan Hughes, Republican member of the Texas State Senate from Wood County since 2017 and previous member of the Texas House of Representatives
- Will Jennings, Songwriter; Grammy, Golden Globe and Academy Award winner
- Bill Johnson, professional football player
- Johnny Knox, professional football player
- Bill C. Malone, American musician, author and historian specializing in country music
- Charles R. Moore (minister), Methodist minister and civil rights advocate
- Ali Musse, professional soccer player
- Robert Pack, professional basketball player and coach
- Chuck Quilter, professional football player
- Josh Reynolds, professional football player
- Shaquille Murray-Lawrence, professional football player and bobsledder
- Dominic Rhodes, professional football player
- Craig Tiley, CEO of Tennis Australia and Director of the Australian Open
- Byron M. Tunnell, Texas politician
- Chris Tomlin, Christian Singer, Songwriter, Worship leader, Dove and Grammy Award winner
- Jared Wells, professional baseball player
- Shea Whigham, actor
- Karl Williams, professional football player
