= Lloydminster Meridians =

Lloydminster Meridians was a baseball team in Lloydminster, Alberta, Canada that played along with the Edmonton Eskimos and the Edmonton Drakes.
