= Nash Walters =

American baseball player (born 1997)

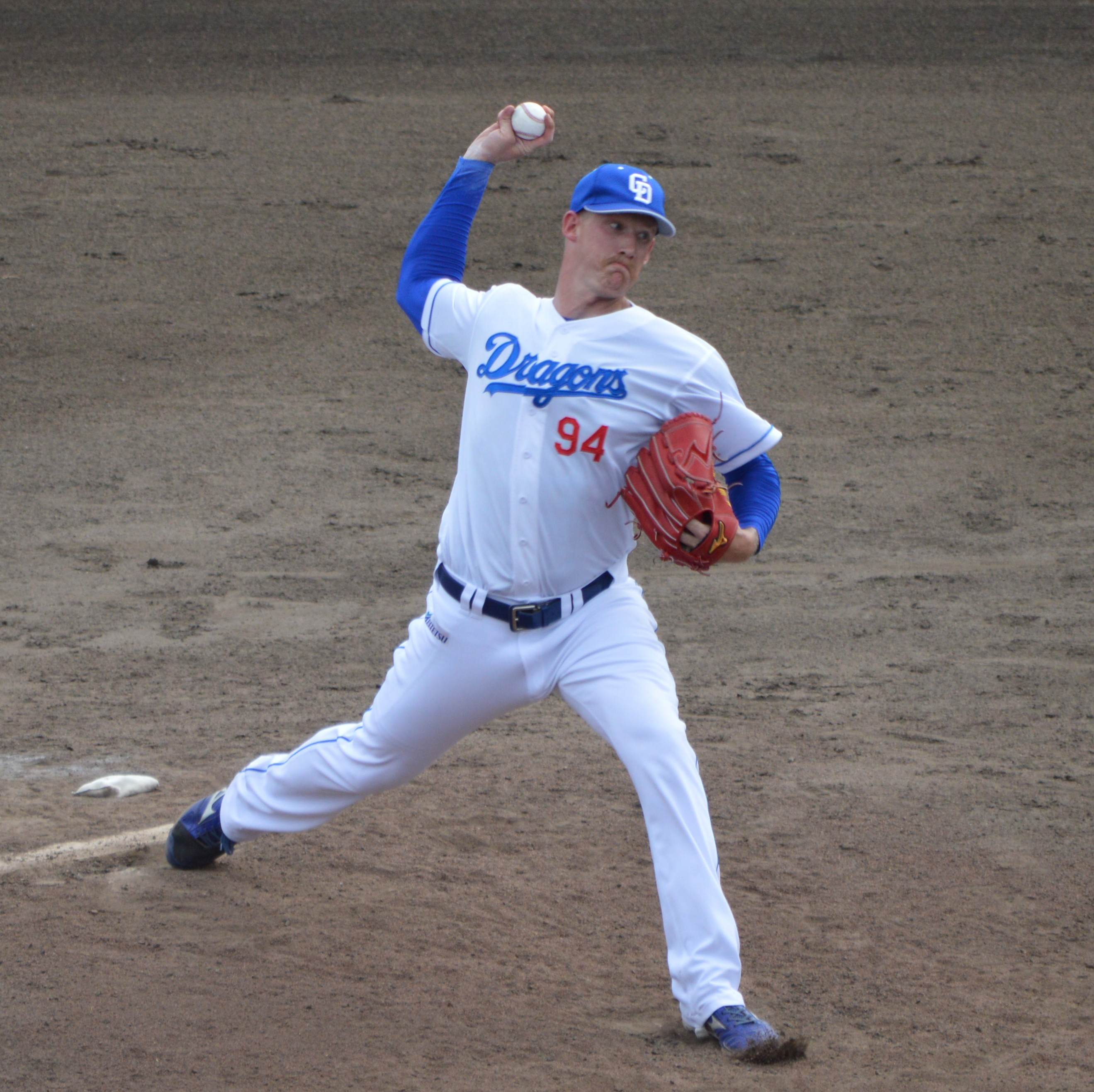
- Walters with the Chunichi Dragons

Free agent
- Pitcher
- Born: May 18, 1997 (age 29); Tyler, Texas, U.S.
- Bats: Right Throws: Right

Professional debut
- MLB: October 5, 2022, for the Los Angeles Angels
- NPB: June 17, 2025, for the Chunichi Dragons

MLB statistics (through 2022 season)
- Win–loss record: 0–0
- Earned run average: 0.00
- Strikeouts: 0

NPB statistics (through 2026 season)
- Win–loss record: 3-5
- Earned run average: 4.29
- Strikeouts: 47
- Saves: 5
- Stats at Baseball Reference

Teams
- Los Angeles Angels (2022); Chunichi Dragons (2025); Tokyo Yakult Swallows (2026)

Nash Owen Walters (born May 18, 1997) is an American professional baseball pitcher who is a free agent. He has previously played in Major League Baseball (MLB) for the Los Angeles Angels, and in Nippon Professional Baseball (NPB) for the Chunichi Dragons and Tokyo Yakult Swallows.

== Career ==
Walters graduated from Lindale High School in Lindale, Texas. He committed to attend Texas A&M University on a college baseball scholarship.

=== Milwaukee Brewers ===
The Milwaukee Brewers selected Walters in the third round, with the 90th overall selection, in the 2015 MLB draft. He signed with the Brewers, and spent his first pro season with the rookie–level Arizona League Brewers, logging a 4.15 ERA in 11 games. Walters split the 2016 season between the AZL Brewers and the rookie–level Helena Brewers. In 14 games (9 starts), he accumulated a 5.35 ERA with 48 strikeouts in 38 2/3 innings pitched.

Walters missed the entirety of the 2017 season with a right elbow strain. He elected to undergo Tommy John surgery in September 2017, and missed the entire 2018 season as a result. He returned to action in 2019 with the rookie–level Rocky Mountain Vibes, starting 13 contests and posting a 3.40 ERA with 46 strikeouts in 50 1/3 innings pitched. Walters did not play in a game in 2020 due to the cancellation of the minor league season because of the COVID-19 pandemic.

He spent the 2021 season with the High–A Wisconsin Timber Rattlers, making 43 appearances and logging a 4.33 ERA with 82 strikeouts and 2 saves in 60 1/3 innings of work. Walters began the 2022 season with the Double–A Biloxi Shuckers, making 42 appearances and recording a 4.60 ERA with 66 strikeouts in 47.0 innings pitched. He was then promoted to the Triple–A Nashville Sounds, where he made two scoreless appearances.

=== Los Angeles Angels ===
On September 4, 2022, Walters was traded to the Los Angeles Angels in exchange for cash considerations. The Angels subsequently added him to their 40-man roster and optioned him to the Salt Lake Bees of the Triple-A Pacific Coast League. After seven relief appearances for Salt Lake, Walters was promoted to the major leagues for the first time on September 29. Walters made his major league debut on October 5, pitching against the Oakland Athletics.

On November 15, 2022, Walters was designated for assignment. On November 18, he was non–tendered and became a free agent. He re-signed with the Angels on a minor league deal on December 14, 2022. Walters was released by the Angels on March 24, 2023.

=== Chicago White Sox ===
On April 19, 2023, Walters signed a minor league contract with the Chicago White Sox organization. In 27 games split between the Double–A Birmingham Barons and Triple–A Charlotte Knights, he struggled to a cumulative 9.64 ERA with 44 strikeouts and 3 saves in 28.0 innings of work. On July 13, Walters was released by Chicago.

=== Washington Nationals ===
On July 21, 2023, Walters signed a minor league contract with the Washington Nationals. In 10 games for the Double–A Harrisburg Senators, he struggled to a 6.08 ERA with 14 strikeouts and 3 saves across 13 1/3 innings pitched. Walters elected free agency following the season on November 6.

On December 19, 2023, Walters re–signed with the Nationals organization on a new minor league contract. He split the 2024 season between the Single-A Fredericksburg Nationals, Harrisburg, and the Triple-A Rochester Red Wings. In 26 appearances split between the three affiliates, Walters posted a cumulative 2.43 ERA with 30 strikeouts and 4 saves across 33 1/3 innings pitched. He elected free agency following the season on November 4, 2024.

=== Chunichi Dragons ===
On January 28, 2025, Walters signed with the Chunichi Dragons of Nippon Professional Baseball. He made three scoreless appearances for Chunichi, recording five strikeouts and five walks across five innings pitched. Walters became a free agent following the season.

=== Tokyo Yakult Swallows ===
On December 15, 2025, Walters signed with the Tokyo Yakult Swallows of Nippon Professional Baseball. He became a free agent following the season.
