= Edmonton Dodgers =

The Edmonton Dodgers were a baseball team located in Edmonton, Alberta, Canada. The Dodgers replaced the Edmonton Cubs in the Big Four League for the 1950 season. In their only season, the Dodgers won the league championship by defeating the Edmonton Eskimos (baseball).
