= Edmonton Navy Cardinals =

Former Baseball Team

The Edmonton Navy Cardinals were a baseball team located in Edmonton, Alberta, Canada. The team played for one season in 1946 as part of a three-team league in Edmonton. The league's other teams were the Edmonton Cubs and the Edmonton Eskimos (baseball).
