= Pat Mahomes =

American baseball player (born 1970)

- Pitcher
- Born: August 9, 1970 (age 56); Bryan, Texas, U.S.
- Batted: Right Threw: Right

Professional debut
- MLB: April 4, 1992, for the Minnesota Twins
- NPB: July 15, 1997, for the Yokohama BayStars

Last appearance
- NPB: September 9, 1998, for the Yokohama BayStars
- MLB: August 26, 2003, for the Pittsburgh Pirates

MLB statistics
- Win–loss record: 42–39
- Earned run average: 5.47
- Strikeouts: 452

NPB statistics
- Win–loss record: 3–8
- Earned run average: 5.34
- Strikeouts: 66
- Stats at Baseball Reference

Teams
- Minnesota Twins (1992–1996); Boston Red Sox (1996–1997); Yokohama BayStars (1997–1998); New York Mets (1999–2000); Texas Rangers (2001); Chicago Cubs (2002); Pittsburgh Pirates (2003)

Patrick Lavon Mahomes Sr. (born August 9, 1970) is an American former professional baseball pitcher. He played in Major League Baseball from 1992 to 2003 with the Minnesota Twins, Boston Red Sox, New York Mets, Texas Rangers, Chicago Cubs, and Pittsburgh Pirates. Mahomes also pitched in two seasons in Nippon Professional Baseball, 1997 and 1998 with the Yokohama BayStars. He last played with the Grand Prairie AirHogs of the independent American Association in 2009.

== Early life and amateur career ==
Mahomes was born in Texas, one of three children. His father worked for a local oil company and coached Mahomes' youth baseball team. His mother worked as a nurse until Mahomes was seven years old, when she was in a car accident that left her requiring the use of a wheelchair.

Mahomes attended Lindale High School in Lindale, Texas, where he played baseball, football, and basketball. He was an intense competitor and, according to his parents, would cry or refuse to eat or talk after every loss in high school. He was also a member of the National Honor Society and had the second-highest grade point average in his graduating class.

Mahomes was only 5 ft 9 in (1.75 m) as a high school junior but earned all-state honors as a football quarterback and averaged 30 points per game in basketball. In baseball, he played shortstop and pitched. He received scholarship offers to play all three sports collegiately but most strongly considered a scholarship offer to play college baseball and walk on to the basketball team for the Arkansas Razorbacks.

== Professional career ==
=== Early minor league career ===
The Minnesota Twins drafted Mahomes in the sixth round of the 1988 MLB draft. He began his professional career with the Elizabethton Twins that summer as a starting pitcher. Over the next few years, he worked his way up through the Twins farm system, reaching Triple-A in 1991 with the Portland Beavers.

=== Minnesota Twins ===
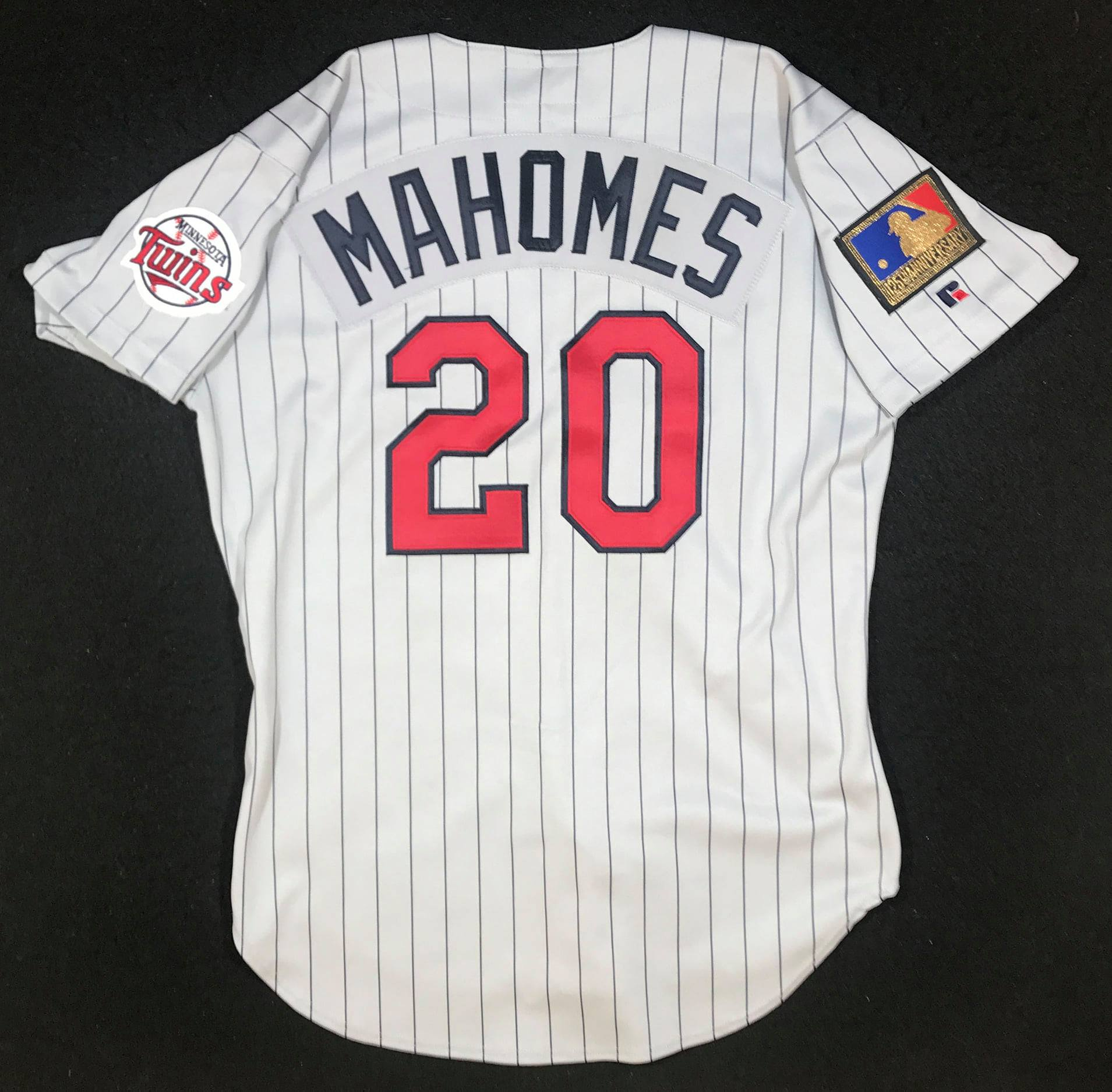
Minnesota Twins 1994 #20 Pat Mahomes road jersey

Mahomes made his major league debut with the Twins in 1992. He made the team out of spring training and started the sixth game of the season, on April 12 against the Texas Rangers, pitching six innings and getting a no decision. He notched his first major league win in his next start, on April 21 against the Seattle Mariners. Mahomes played with the Twins into the 1996 season, appearing in a total of 114 games (51 starts) during five seasons while compiling an 18–28 record with 5.82 ERA, with 217 strikeouts in 366 2/3 innings.

=== Boston Red Sox ===
The Twins traded Mahomes to the Boston Red Sox on August 26, 1996 for a player to be named later (which turned out to be pitcher Brian Looney). Mahomes pitched a total of 21 games (all in relief) during the 1996 and 1997 seasons with Boston, registering a 6.85 ERA with 3–0 record and 11 strikeouts in 22 1/3 innings. He was released by the Red Sox on June 27, 1997.

=== Yokohama BayStars ===
Mahomes played for the Yokohama BayStars of Nippon Professional Baseball, signing with them midway through the 1997 season and pitched with them through 1998.

=== New York Mets ===
Mahomes signed with the New York Mets in December 1998. He went 8–0 in the 1999 season during 39 relief appearances, and helped the Mets reach the playoffs. Mahomes made four relief appearances during the postseason, recording a 2.25 ERA in eight innings pitched while striking out four, as the Mets lost to the Atlanta Braves in the NLCS. In 2000, Mahomes was 5–3 in 53 appearances (five starts), and while the Mets reached the World Series, Mahomes was left off the Mets' playoff roster. In his two seasons with the Mets, he appeared in 92 regular season games (five starts) with a 4.74 ERA, 13–3 record, and 127 strikeouts in 157 2/3 innings. He became a free agent in December 2000.

=== Texas Rangers ===
Mahomes signed with his home-state Texas Rangers in January 2001. During the 2001 season, he appeared in 56 games (four starts) with a 5.70 ERA and 7–6 record, while striking out 61 in 107 1/3 innings. Mahomes again became a free agent in November.

=== Chicago Cubs ===
In January 2002, Mahomes signed with the Chicago Cubs. He made 16 appearances (two starts) during the 2002 season, with a 3.86 ERA and 1–1 record, striking out 23 in 32 2/3 innings. He became a free agent in October.

=== Pittsburgh Pirates ===
Mahomes signed with the Pittsburgh Pirates in January 2003. He made nine appearances (one start) with the Pirates during the 2003 season, recording an 0–1 record with 4.84 ERA and 13 strikeouts in 22 1/3 innings. This would prove to be his final season playing in MLB. Mahomes again became a free agent in September.

Overall, Mahomes pitched 11 seasons in MLB, making a total of 308 regular season appearances (63 starts) with a 42–39 record, 5.47 ERA, and 452 strikeouts in 709 innings pitched. He had 43 at bats during his career, with 11 hits (.256 batting average) and four RBI.

=== Minor league journeyman ===
In 2003, Mahomes pitched primarily for the Pirates' Triple-A affiliate, the Nashville Sounds, while appearing in nine games for the Pirates. In 2004, he split the season between three organizations, pitching for the Edmonton Trappers in the Montreal Expos farm system, the Albuquerque Isotopes in the Florida Marlins system, and then again at Nashville at the end of the season.

After spending 2005 with the Las Vegas 51s in the Los Angeles Dodgers organization, Mahomes turned to the independent leagues, starting 2006 with the Long Island Ducks of the Atlantic League. After going 11–4 with a 3.87 ERA, he signed with Kansas City Royals in August, but was released a month later.

Mahomes began the 2007 season with the Sioux Falls Canaries of the American Association. On August 24, the Toronto Blue Jays signed him, and he appeared in three games for the Syracuse Chiefs before becoming a free agent at the end of the season. Mahomes signed with the Southern Maryland Blue Crabs of the Atlantic League in 2008, but only appeared in two games for them before returning to Sioux Falls. He split the 2009 season between Sioux Falls and Grand Prairie.

In 2019, Mahomes was inducted to the Sioux Falls Canaries Hall of Fame.

== Personal life ==
Mahomes is divorced. He has two sons with his ex-wife: Patrick II, who is a three-time Super Bowl champion quarterback for the Kansas City Chiefs and Jackson, who is a social media influencer. Patrick II goes by "Patrick" to avoid being confused with his father, who has also been referred to as Pat Mahomes Sr. by media outlets. Mahomes received attention for smoking cigars dedicated to the opposing teams' quarterbacks his son has defeated in AFC Championship Games. Mahomes has two other sons, one of whom, Graham Walker, played college football at Brown, and two daughters. He has three grandchildren.

=== Legal issues ===
Mahomes has been arrested multiple times for driving while intoxicated (DWI), most recently on February 4, 2024—the number of arrests has been reported as three or six, varying by source. The trial for his February 2024 DWI arrest was slated to begin in late July 2024. In August 2024, it was revealed in court documents that Mahomes was criminally charged with DWI on three occasions, with his two prior charges occurring September 12, 2008, in South Dakota and on February 26, 2019, in Smith County, Texas.

On July 12, 2024, court documents obtained by TMZ revealed that Mahomes had also been driving with a driver's license that was invalid due to his ongoing DWI case. This was discovered on June 29, 2024, when was he pulled over in Tyler, Texas for disregarding traffic signs. He was issued a traffic ticket for the invalid driver's license and issued a warning for disregarding the traffic signs. For this traffic citation, he was required to make a court appearance on July 31, 2024. On August 27, 2024, Mahomes pled guilty in the Smith County court in Tyler to his third DWI charge. Under the plea deal, Mahomes agreed to serve five years of probation and one year of "intense supervision," with his sentencing hearing scheduled for September 23, 2024. At sentencing, Judge Kerry L. Russell imposed in addition to the five years of probation an order requiring Mahomes to spend 10 days in jail, suspending his license for one year and specified that he be subject to "intense supervision" during the first year of probation. On February 3, 2026, Mahomes was arrested in Smith County for violating a term of his probation for his most recent driving-while-intoxicated sentence. According to Smith County District Attorney Jacob Putman, Mahomes allegedly drank alcohol, which violated his probation.
