= Holy Cross Cemetery (Edmonton) =

Roman Catholic cemetery in Alberta, Canada

- Interactive map of Holy Cross Cemetery

Details
- Established: 1954
- Location: Edmonton, Alberta, Canada
- Country: Canada
- Coordinates: 53°36′30″N 113°34′58″W
- Type: Roman Catholic
- Owned by: Edmonton Archdiocese
- Size: 45 acres (0.18 km^{2})
- No. of graves: >15,000
- Website: Holy Cross Cemetery
- Find a Grave: Holy Cross Cemetery

Holy Cross Cemetery is a Roman Catholic cemetery located at 14611 Mark Messier Trail NW in Edmonton, Alberta, Canada. The cemetery is owned and operated by the Roman Catholic Archdiocese of Edmonton and was opened by the archdiocese in 1954. Since 1990, the cemetery has a mausoleum, the Holy Cross Mausoleum.

== Notable interments ==
- Johnny Bright (1930–1983), Canadian Football League player
- John Ducey (1908–1983), Canadian baseball executive and umpire
- Gord Hannigan (1929–1966), Toronto Maple Leafs hockey player
- Bill Hunter (1920–2002), hockey player, coach, and businessman, founder of the Edmonton Oilers
- Joseph MacNeil (1924–2018), archbishop of the Archdiocese of Edmonton
- Rollie Miles (1927–1995), Canadian Football League player and educator
