= Baseball Alberta =

Canadian provincial sports governing body

- Sport: Baseball
- Jurisdiction: Alberta
- Abbreviation: Baseball Alberta
- Founded: 1967
- Affiliation: Baseball Canada
- Headquarters: Percy Page Center, Edmonton
- Location: Edmonton, Alberta
- President: Jon Oko
- Sponsor: Sport Canada, Baseball Canada

Official website
- www.baseballalberta.com
- (Canada)
- (Alberta)

Baseball Alberta is the provincial governing body for baseball in Alberta. It is recognized by Baseball Canada as the official Provincial Sport Organization for baseball in the province. Established in 1967, Baseball Alberta now supports more than 120 member associations and over 17,000 registered players across Alberta.

== History ==
Baseball Alberta was founded in 1967 to organize, promote, and regulate amateur baseball across Alberta. The organization manages leagues, development pathways, coaching and umpire education, and provincial championships.

== Mission and vision ==
- Vision: To promote and develop the sport of baseball in Alberta.
- Mission: To serve as the provincial sport body providing life and leadership skills for all genders through baseball while encouraging fun and fair play in all aspects of the game.

== Player and grassroots development ==
Baseball Alberta delivers and supports a wide range of development programs designed to promote long-term athlete development across the province. These include:

- Rally Cap
- 9U Rookie
- Challenger Baseball
- Winterball
- LTAD (Long Term Athlete Development) frameworks
- Outreach & My First Pitch
- Baseball5

== Leagues ==
Baseball Alberta administers several provincial and regional leagues offering competitive and developmental opportunities for athletes at all ages.

=== Leagues managed by Baseball Alberta ===
==== Baseball Alberta Provincial League (BAPL) ====
The Baseball Alberta Provincial League (BAPL) is Alberta’s primary province-wide competition structure for the 11U, 13U, 15U, 18U, and 22U age categories. It includes the Baseball Alberta Elite League, along with AAA, AA, and A provincial divisions, culminating in annual Provincial Championships.

===== Elite Division =====
The Baseball Alberta Elite League is the highest competitive division for 18U teams in the BAPL league system.

===== AAA Division =====
AAA competition serves 13U, 15U, and 18U teams and operates on a full province-wide schedule.

===== AA Division =====
AA competition is offered at 11U, 13U, 15U, and 18U, with a season format of:

- May – Regional play
- June – North & South divisional play
- July – Tiered Provincial Championships

===== A Division =====
The A division supports community-level 11U, 13U, 15U, and 18U teams, offering extended July play and guaranteed entry into tiered Provincial Championships.

==== Baseball Alberta Girls League (BAGL) ====
The Baseball Alberta Girls League provides development and competition opportunities for female athletes in the 9U, 12U, and 14U categories.

=== Community leagues (affiliated) ===
Several community-based leagues operate in partnership with Baseball Alberta, including:

- Central Alberta Baseball League (CABL)
- County Union Baseball (CUB) League
- Edmonton Rural Recreational Baseball League (ERRBL)
- YEG A League
- Fall Ball programs

=== Leagues not managed by Baseball Alberta ===
Several independent senior and community leagues operate in Alberta:

Senior Leagues

- Sunburst League
- Powerline Baseball League (PBL)
- Alberta West Central Baseball Association (AWCBA)
- North Central Alberta Baseball League (NCABL)

Community Leagues

- Lakeland Minor Ball League (LMBL)
- Calgary North Baseball League (CNPL)

== Coaching and umpire development ==
Baseball Alberta oversees coaching and umpire education in partnership with the National Coaching Certification Program (NCCP) and the National Umpire Certification Program (NUCP).

=== National Umpire Certification Program (NUCP) ===
Umpires must complete clinic, exam, and evaluation requirements. Level 4–5 umpires must pass two annual on-field evaluations.

Baseball Alberta may suspend umpires for misconduct or incompetence, with written appeals reviewed by the Executive Board.

=== Umpire assigning ===
- 13U AAA, 15U AA/AAA, 18U AA/AAA, the Elite League, and 22U are assigned by the Provincial Umpire Committee
- A divisions, community leagues, 11U AA, and 13U AA are assigned locally
- A/AA/AAA Provincial Championships are fully assigned provincially, with Baseball Alberta covering mileage and accommodations

== Sunburst League ==
The Sunburst League is Alberta’s Senior AAA league and one of the highest levels of amateur baseball in the province.

2025 Teams

- Edmonton Cubs
- Red Deer Riggers
- St. Albert Tigers
- Sherwood Park Athletics
- Calgary Rockies
- Calgary Diamondbacks
- Edmonton Padres

== Leadership ==
=== Presidents ===
- 2021–Present: Jon Oko (Edmonton)
- 2017–2020: Ron Van Keulen (Calgary)
- 2009–2016: Don Paulencu (Sherwood Park)
- 2003–2008: Carl Linden (Grande Prairie)
- 2001–2002: Phyllis Pannenbaker (Edmonton)
- 1999–2000: Don Kadatz (Beaumont)
- 1997–1998: Doug Boisvert (Edmonton)
- 1993–1996: Doug Jones (Oyen)
- 1987–1992: Wally Footz (Edmonton)
- 1986: Clint Fystro (Peace River)
- 1982–1985: Jim Cramer (Spruce Grove)
- 1980–1981: Elmer Schiekle (Provost)
- 1978–1979: Bob O'Brian (Barrhead)
- 1975–1977: Al Wilson (Edmonton)
- 1974: Les Long (Edmonton)
- 1972–1973: Walter Cleland (Bow Island)
- 1969–1971: Ron Hayter (Edmonton)
- 1966–1968: Angus Mirray (Edmonton)
- 1965: Matt Volk (Edmonton)
- 1964: Reid Olsen (Pincher Creek)
- 1962–1963: F. Lupul (Edmonton)
- 1961: Andy Pisko (Lethbridge)
- 1960: F. Lupul (Edmonton)
- 1957–1959: Andy Pisko (Lethbridge)
- 1954–1956: H. J. Doherty (Westlock)
- 1953: H. L. West (Del Bonita)
- 1951–1952: Sanford Sawyer

=== Executive Directors ===
- 2022–Present: Danielle Moffat
- 2020–2021: Tamara Rosnau
- 2011–2020: Darren Dekinder
- 2006–2007: Bob Cardinal
- 2003–2005: Ron Betts
- 2002: Craig Hordal
- 1997–2001: Julie Leshchyshyn
- 1995–1996: Randy Strocki
- 1987–1994: Phyllis Pannenbaker
- 1985–1986: Jay Dow
- 1982–1984: Dennis Pipella
