= Lindale Independent School District =

School district in Texas

Lindale Independent School District is a public school district based in Lindale, Texas (USA), and is designated as "Exemplary" (2010–2011) for its quality by the Texas Education Agency.

In addition to Lindale, the district serves the residential community of Hideaway and areas in northwestern Smith County. A small portion of eastern Van Zandt County also lies within the district.

== Schools ==
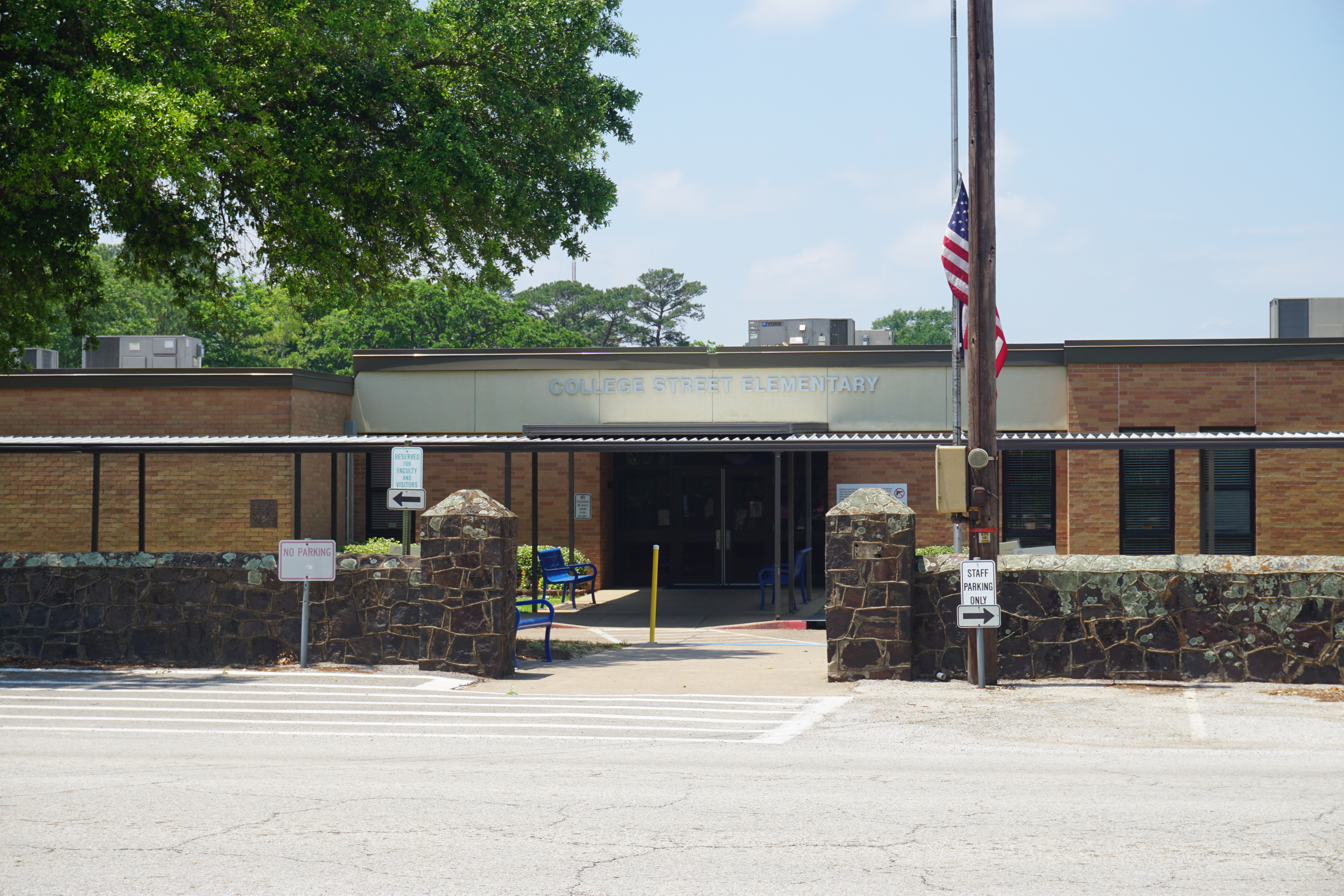
College Street Elementary School

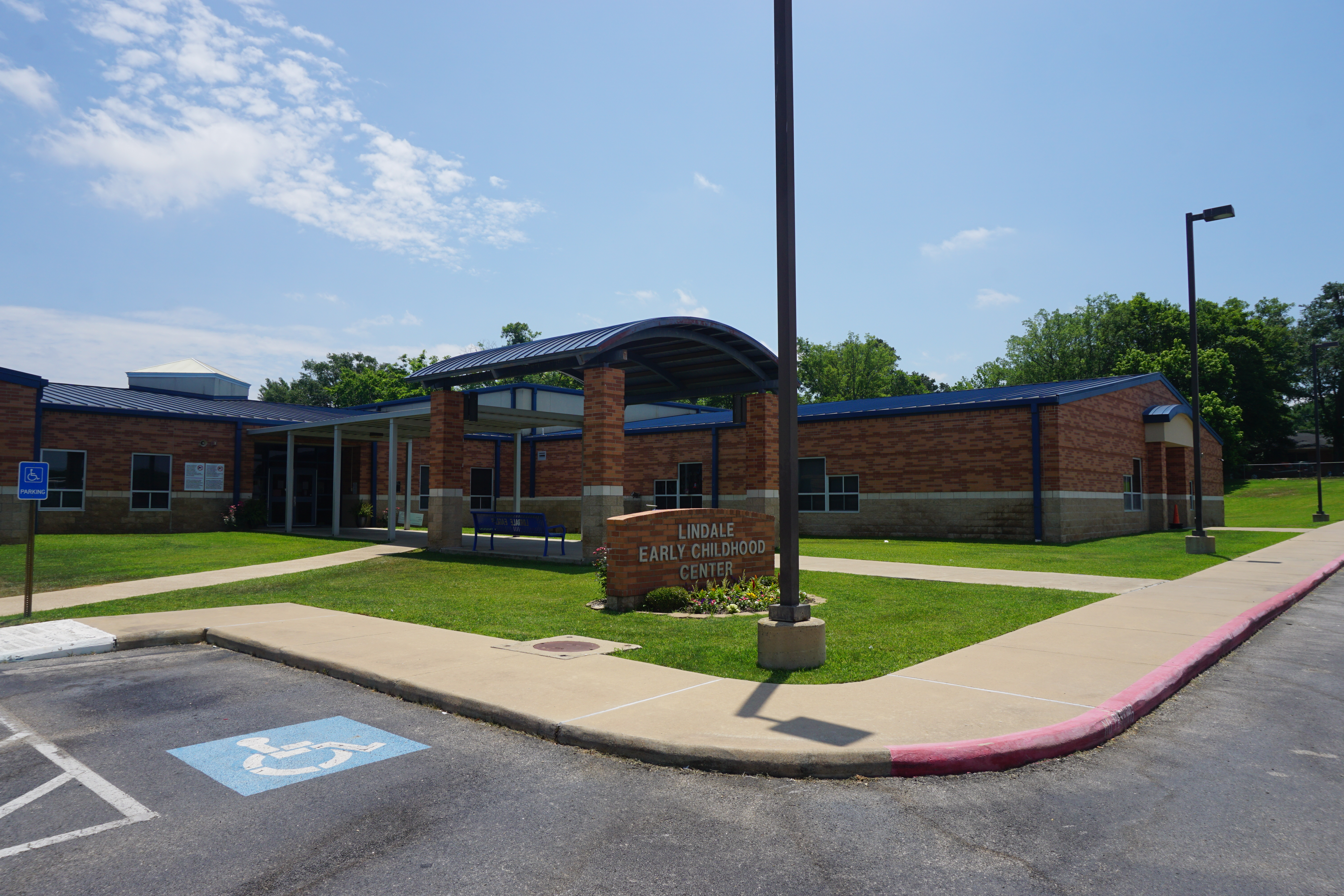
Lindale Early Childhood Center

=== High School (Grades 9-12) ===
- Lindale High School

=== Junior High School (Grades 7-8) ===
- Lindale Junior High School

=== Intermediate Schools (Grades 4-6) ===
- E.J. Moss Intermediate School (East campus)
- E.J. Moss Intermediate School (West campus)

=== Elementary Schools (Grades 1-3) ===
- Velma Penny Elementary School
- College Street Elementary School

=== Childhood Center (Grades PK-K) ===
- Lindale Early Childhood Center
