= Edmonton Trappers =

- 1981–2004; Edmonton, Alberta

Minor league affiliations
- Class: Triple-A (1981–2004)
- League: Pacific Coast League (1981–2004)

Major league affiliations
- Team: Montreal Expos (2003–2004); Minnesota Twins (2001–2002); Anaheim Angels (1999–2000); Oakland Athletics (1995–1998); Florida Marlins (1993–1994); California Angels (1983–1992); Chicago White Sox (1981–1982)

Minor league titles
- League titles (4): 1984; 1996; 1997; 2002
- Division titles (6): 1984; 1990; 1996; 1997; 2002; 2003

Team data
- Name: Edmonton Trappers (1981–2004)
- Mascot: Homer (1986–2004)
- Ballpark: Telus Field (1995–2004); John Ducey Park (1981–1994)

The Edmonton Trappers were a minor league baseball team in Edmonton, Alberta. They were a part of the Triple-A level in the Pacific Coast League, ending with the 2004 season. Their home games were played at Telus Field in downtown Edmonton.

The Trappers joined the PCL in 1981 when Edmonton businessman Peter Pocklington purchased the Ogden A's franchise from Utah trucker Dennis Job. The team's games were originally played in Renfrew Park (later called John Ducey Park). The Trappers were immediately popular with the community, often above the league average in attendance, attracting almost half a million fans every season. A total of 8 million fans came to see them play over the course of their 24-year existence.

In 1984, the Trappers became the first Canadian franchise to win a PCL championship. At the time, the team was the Triple-A affiliate of the California Angels, only the third (1966 Seattle Angels, 1971 Salt Lake City Angels) and, as of 2025, most recent Angels affiliate to win a PCL championship. The manager was Moose Stubing.

In 1995, John Ducey Park was torn down and replaced by Telus Field where the Trappers celebrated three PCL titles in their last decade, most recently in 2002 under the affiliation of the Minnesota Twins. In 2003, the team became the major affiliate of the Montreal Expos. The Trappers were one of the most successful, longest running, and second-to-last affiliated team in Canada.

In 2004, future Montreal Expos and Toronto Blue Jays pitcher Scott Downs threw a no-hitter against Las Vegas on June 11. It was the first no hitter by a Trapper since August 8, 1996, when Aaron Small threw one against the Vancouver Canadians.

Edmonton qualified for playoffs for the last time in September 2003. They defeated the Portland Beavers to make the post-season, but were eliminated immediately by the Sacramento River Cats in a three-game sweep.

In October 2003, the Trappers' fate in Edmonton was sealed when the team, then owned by the Canadian Football League's Edmonton Eskimos, was sold to a group led by hall of famer Nolan Ryan and his son Reid. The sale shocked many fans in Edmonton. The Ryans moved the team after the 2004 season to Round Rock, Texas, a suburb north of Austin, and it was renamed the Round Rock Express. The last home game in Edmonton had a sizeable crowd against the Las Vegas 51s, but it was rained out after only one inning.

== Notable former Trappers ==
- (Puerto Rico) Juan Agosto
- (United States) Rubén Amaro Jr.
- (Canada) Bill Atkinson
- (Dominican Republic) Tony Batista
- (United States) Dante Bichette
- (United States) Casey Blake
- (United States) Hubie Brooks
- (United States) Scott Brosius
- (United States) Mike Brown
- (United States) Eric Chavez
- (United States) Ryan Church
- (United States) Michael Cuddyer
- (United States) Chad Curtis
- (United States) Gary DiSarcina
- (United States) Scott Downs
- (United States) David Eckstein
- (United States) Jim Edmonds
- (United States) Carl Everett
- (United States) Mark Gardner
- (United States) Jason Giambi
- (United States) Ben Grieve
- (United States) Ken Hill
- (United States) Wally Joyner
- (Venezuela) Maicer Izturis
- (United States) Ron Kittle
- (United States) Patrick Mahomes Sr.
- (Canada) Kirk McCaskill
- (United States) Mark McLemore
- (Canada) Justin Morneau
- (United States) Jerry Narron
- (United States) Gary Pettis
- (Venezuela) Gus Polidor
- (United States) Mike Ramsey
- (United States) Steve Rogers
- (United States) Tim Salmon
- (Venezuela) Johan Santana
- (United States) Scot Shields
- (United States) Terrmel Sledge
- (United States) Scott Spiezio
- (Canada) Matt Stairs
- (United States) Lee Stevens
- (Dominican Republic) Miguel Tejada
- (Puerto Rico) Javier Valentín
- (United States) Ellis Valentine
- (Mexico) Fernando Valenzuela
- (Jamaica) Devon White
- (Canada) Nigel Wilson
- (United States) Ernie Young

Baseball Hall of Fame

- (United States) Bert Blyleven (player, 2011 induction)
