= Edmonton Legislatures =

First professional baseball team in Edmonton, Alberta, Canada

The Edmonton Legislatures were the first professional baseball team in Edmonton, Alberta, Canada. The Legislatures existed from 1884 to 1907 before becoming known as the Edmonton Grays.
