= Hideaway, Texas =

- City
- Location of Hideaway, Texas
- Coordinates: 32°29′46″N 95°27′29″W
- Country: United States
- State: Texas
- County: Smith

Area
  - Total: 2.43 sq mi (6.29 km^{2})
  - Land: 2.07 sq mi (5.35 km^{2})
  - Water: 0.36 sq mi (0.94 km^{2})
- Elevation: 466 ft (142 m)

Population (2020)
  - Total: 3,201
  - Density: 1,536.6/sq mi (593.28/km^{2})
- Time zone: UTC-6 (Central (CST))
  - Summer (DST): UTC-5 (CDT)
- Zip Code: 75771
- Area codes: 903, 430
- FIPS code: 48-33578
- GNIS feature ID: 2410757
- Website: cityofhideaway.org

Hideaway is a largely residential city and gated community in Smith County, Texas, United States. As of the 2020 census, the population was 3,201.

Hideaway is part of the Tyler Metropolitan Statistical Area.

== History ==
The land that now encompasses Hideaway was originally included in the large plantation owned by Texas governor Richard B. Hubbard. Later, the land was purchased by developer James Fair. In 1967, Fair planned and developed the land, naming it "Hide-A-Way Lake." The community was slated to contain 1,350 acres (5.5 km^{2}) with a total 1,944 residential lots. In 2000, the community, then managed by Hideaway Homeowners, Inc. (which is the HOA) and Hideaway Lake Club, Inc. (which operates the golfing facilities) merged, forming a municipal corporation known as Hideaway Lake Club, Inc.

== Demographics ==
Historical population
Census	Pop.	Note	%±
2010	3,083		—
2020	3,201		3.8%
U.S. Decennial Census

=== 2020 census ===
As of the 2020 census, Hideaway had a population of 3,201 and 1,067 families residing in the city; the median age was 62.8 years. 13.2% of residents were under the age of 18 and 46.4% of residents were 65 years of age or older. For every 100 females there were 90.6 males, and for every 100 females age 18 and over there were 87.6 males age 18 and over.

There were 1,465 households in Hideaway, of which 17.4% had children under the age of 18 living in them. Of all households, 64.7% were married-couple households, 10.0% were households with a male householder and no spouse or partner present, and 23.1% were households with a female householder and no spouse or partner present. About 24.5% of all households were made up of individuals and 19.2% had someone living alone who was 65 years of age or older.

There were 1,667 housing units, of which 12.1% were vacant. The homeowner vacancy rate was 3.1% and the rental vacancy rate was 6.3%.

100.0% of residents lived in urban areas, while 0.0% lived in rural areas.

Racial composition as of the 2020 census
Race	Number	Percent
White	2,967	92.7%
Black or African American	20	0.6%
American Indian and Alaska Native	10	0.3%
Asian	19	0.6%
Native Hawaiian and Other Pacific Islander	1	0.0%
Some other race	22	0.7%
Two or more races	162	5.1%
Hispanic or Latino (of any race)	131	4.1%

(Note: Note: the US Census treats Hispanic/Latino as an ethnic category. This table excludes Latinos from the racial categories and assigns them to a separate category. Hispanics/Latinos can be of any race.)

=== Socioeconomic characteristics ===
There is a poverty rate of about 6% and an individual income of around $32,000.

Most households in Hideaway earn 75 to 125 thousand dollars. The most common individual income is 15 to 25 thousand dollars.

Most people in Hideaway were born in the United States and are married.

The median age in Hideaway is around 63, which gives Hideaway the third largest median age in Texas.

== Education ==
The Lindale Independent School District serves area students.
