= Diamond Park =

Baseball stadium

- Diamond Park in 2026
- Interactive map of Diamond Park
- Location: Edmonton, Alberta
- Coordinates: 53.536584°N 113.492095°W
- Owner: Frank Gray
- Capacity: 1500

Construction
- Groundbreaking: 1906
- Built: 1907
- Opened: May 29, 1907
- Cost: $6,000

Tenants
- Edmonton Eskimos 1909–1911, 1914, 1919–1921, 1922; Edmonton Gray Birds 1912–1913

Diamond Park was a 1,500-seat baseball stadium located in Edmonton, Alberta. A covered grandstand provided 500 and bleachers down the first-base line had 1,000 more seats. Constructed by a local businessman Frank Gray, who was also Edmonton's baseball club director, in 1907. Home to the Edmonton Eskimos baseball team (from 1909 to 1914, 1919-1921 and 1922), it was located on the Ross Flats below the Hotel Macdonald. The park is still known as Diamond Park and has a shaled-infield ball diamond, but the stands are gone, likely since 1935 when nearby Renfrew Park was built and replaced Diamond Park as Edmonton's main ball park.
