= Western Canada League =

Canadian baseball leagues (1907–1921)

The Western Canada League was the name of three different baseball circuits in Minor League Baseball that operated between 1907 and 1921.

The first instance of the league was a Class D circuit that played only in 1907 with four teams sponsored by four cities. The second instance was also a Class D league, which ran from 1909 through 1914 with 11 different cities represented in its six years of existence. The third instance started with four teams at the Class C level in 1919, expanded to six teams in Class B in 1920, and subsequently folded after the 1921 season.

== 1907 ==
=== Cities represented/Teams ===
* Calgary, Alberta	Calgary Bronchos
* Edmonton, Alberta	Edmonton Grays
* Lethbridge, Alberta	Lethbridge Miners
* Medicine Hat, Alberta	Medicine Hat Hatters

== 1909-1914 ==
=== Cities represented/Teams ===
* Bassano, Alberta	Bassano Boosters	1912
* Brandon, Manitoba	Brandon Angels	1909-1911
* Calgary, Alberta	Calgary Cowboys; Calgary Bronchos	1909; 1910-1914
* Edmonton, Alberta	Edmonton Eskimos (baseball); Edmonton Gray Birds	1909-1911, 1914; 1912-1913
* Lethbridge, Alberta	Lethbridge Miners	1909-1910
* Medicine Hat, Alberta	Medicine Hat Hatters	1909-1910, 1913-1914
* Moose Jaw, Saskatchewan	Moose Jaw Robin Hoods	1909-1911, 1913-1914
* Red Deer, Alberta	Red Deer Eskimos	1912
* Regina, Saskatchewan	Regina Bonepilers; Regina Red Sox	1909-1910; 1913-1914
* Saskatoon, Saskatchewan	Saskatoon Berrypickers; Saskatoon Quakers	1910-1911; 1913-1914
* Winnipeg, Manitoba	Winnipeg Maroons	1909-1911

== 1919-1921 ==
=== Cities represented/Teams ===
* Calgary, Alberta	Calgary Bronchos	1920-1921
* Edmonton, Alberta	Edmonton Eskimos (baseball)	1920-1921
* Moose Jaw, Saskatchewan	Moose Jaw Robin Hoods; Moose Jaw Millers	1919-1920; 1921
* Regina, Saskatchewan	Regina Senators	1919-1921
* Saskatoon, Saskatchewan	Saskatoon Quakers	1919-1921
* Winnipeg, Manitoba	Winnipeg Maroons	1919-1921

== Champions ==
* 1907 - Medicine Hat Hatters
* 1909 - Medicine Hat Hatters
* 1910 - Calgary Bronchos
* 1911 - Moose Jaw Robin Hoods
* 1912 - Calgary Bronchos
* 1913 - Moose Jaw Robin Hoods
* 1914 - Saskatoon Quakers
* 1919 - Saskatoon Quakers
* 1920 - Calgary Bronchos
* 1921 - Calgary Bronchos

== Hall of Fame alumni ==
- Heinie Manush

== Notable players ==
- George Blackburn
- Jess Buckles
- Cuckoo Christensen
- Ches Crist
- Steamer Flanagan
- Chicken Hawks
- Spencer Heath
- Babe Herman
- Jerry Hurley
- Joe Kernan
- Howard Lohr
- Jim McGuire
- Bill Merritt
- Bernie Neis
- Lou Nordyke
- Harry Raymond
- Jack Sheehan
- Jack Smith
- Ed Taylor
- Tex Vache
- Ken Williams
- Les Wilson
- Ralph Works
