= Lindale, Texas =

- City
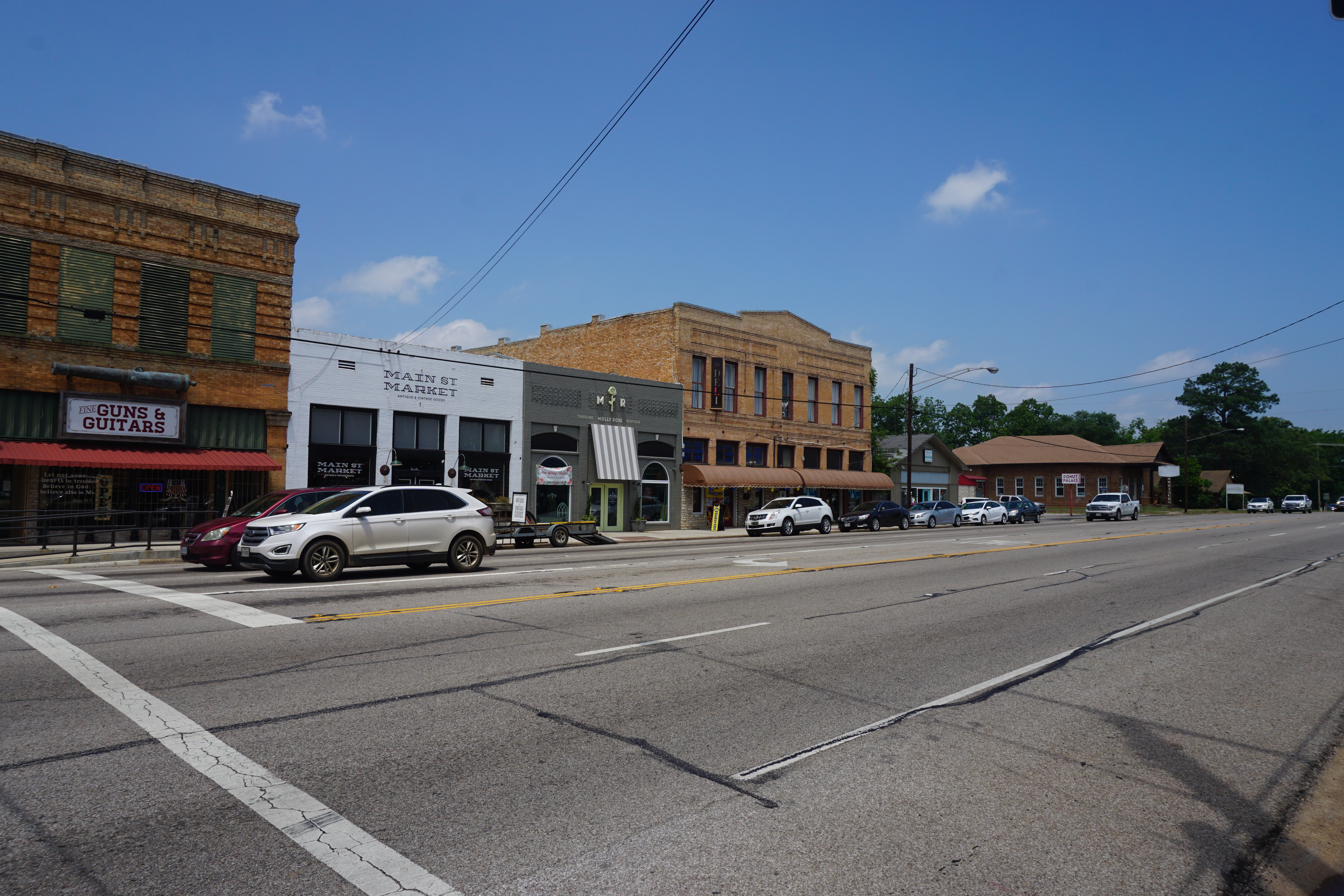
- Main Street in Lindale

- Seal
- Nickname: Blackberry Capital of the World
- Motto: Good Country Living

- Location in Texas
- Coordinates: 32°30′26″N 95°24′30″W
- Country: United States
- State: Texas
- County: Smith
- Founded: 1871
- Incorporated: 1905

Area
  - Total: 6.22 sq mi (16.12 km^{2})
  - Land: 6.18 sq mi (16.00 km^{2})
  - Water: 0.046 sq mi (0.12 km^{2})
- Elevation: 551 ft (168 m)

Population (2020)
  - Total: 6,059
  - Density: 1,046.4/sq mi (404.03/km^{2})
- Demonym: Lindalean or Lindalite
- Time zone: UTC-6 (CST)
  - Summer (DST): UTC-5 (CDT)
- ZIP code: 75771
- Area codes: 903, 430 (overlay)
- FIPS code: 48-42820
- GNIS feature ID: 2412900
- Website: www.lindaletx.gov

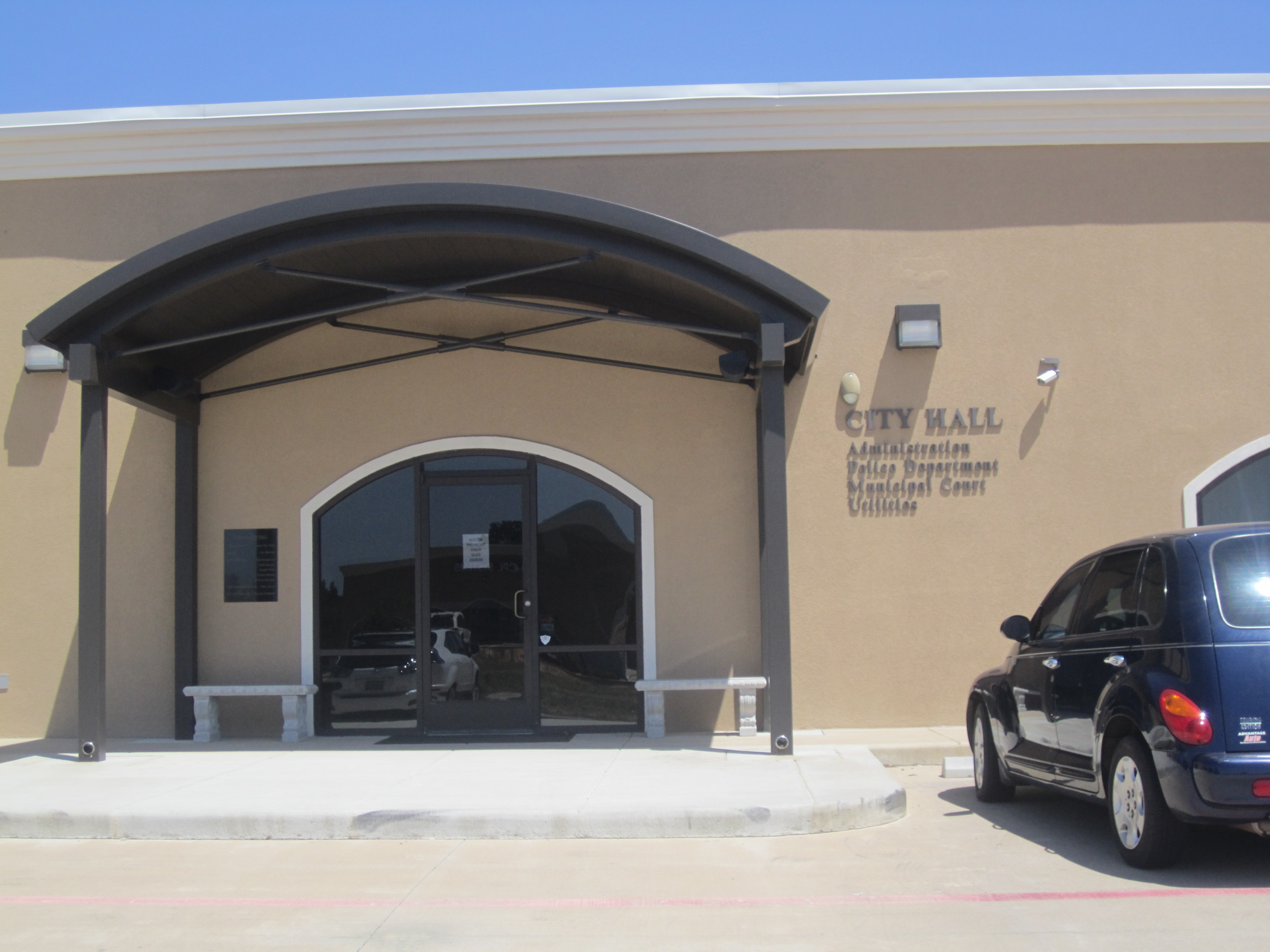
Lindale City Hall

Lindale (/ˈlɪndeɪl/) is a city in Smith County, Texas, United States. Located in East Texas, its population was 6,059 as of 2020 census. It is part of the Tyler, Texas, metropolitan statistical area.

== History ==
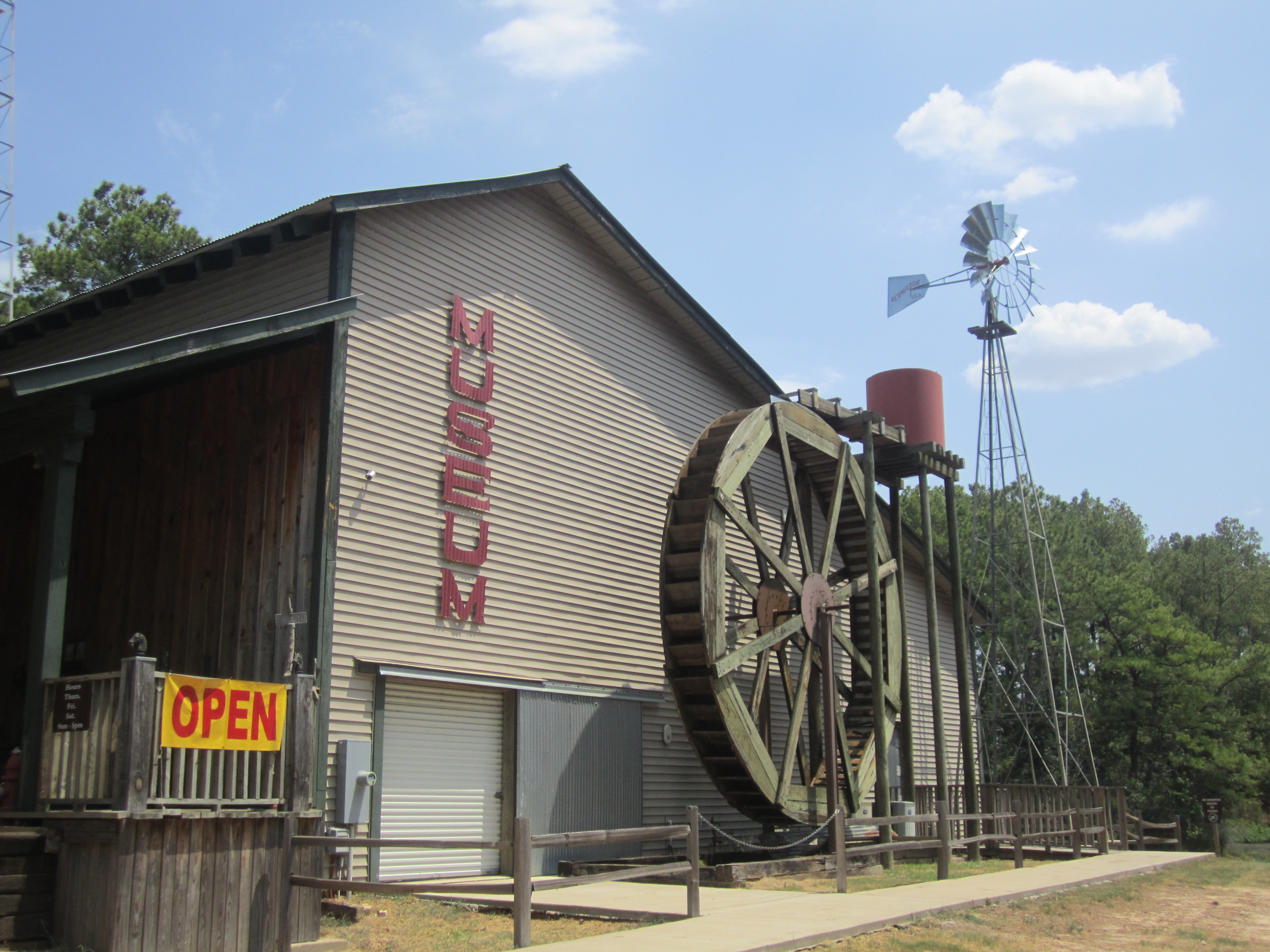
Local history is highlighted in the Old Mill Pond Museum in Lindale.

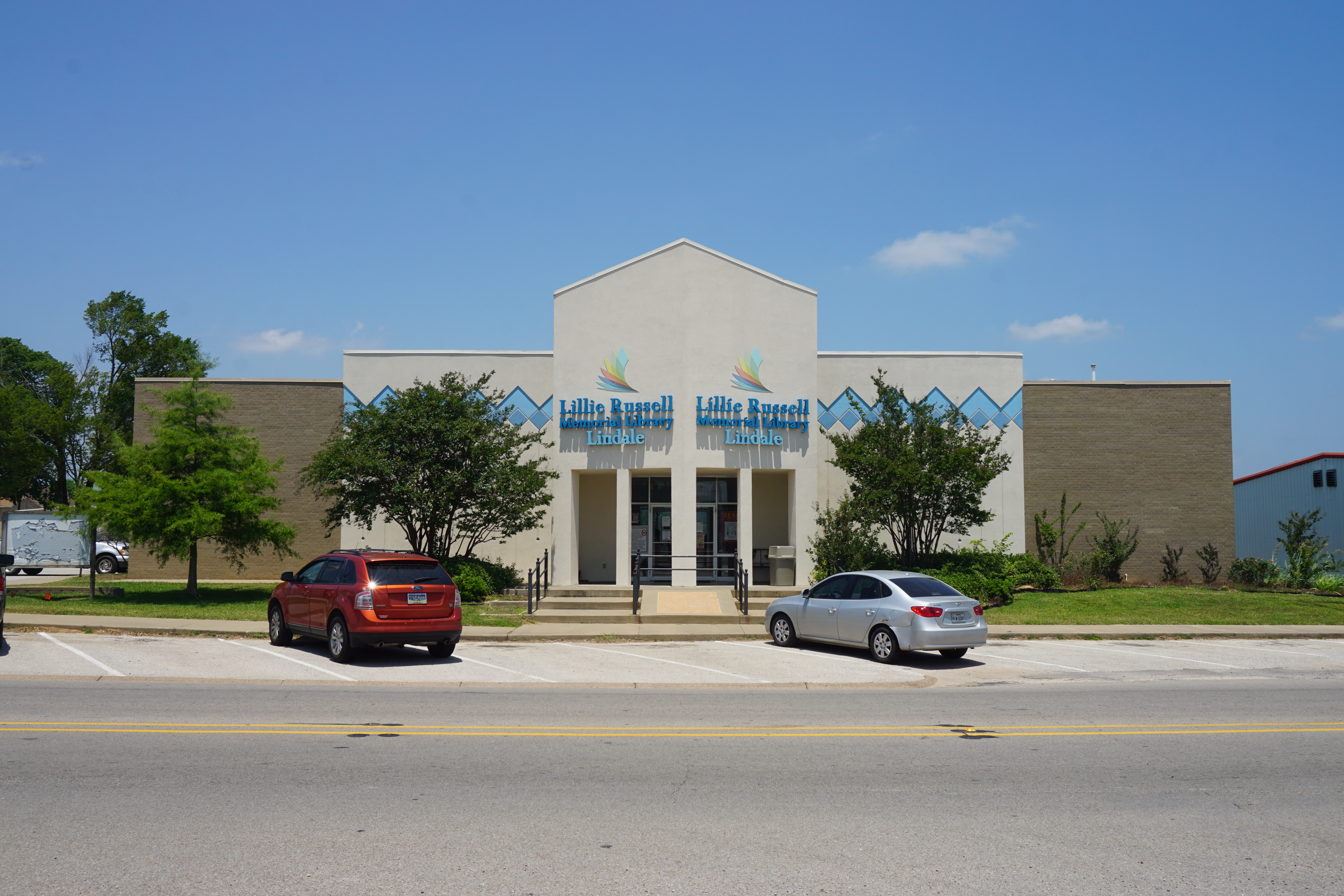
Lillie Russell Memorial Library in Lindale

The area of Smith County where Lindale sits was inhabited long before the town was founded in 1871. In the early 19th century, the Caddo Indians were the area's primary inhabitants; their artifacts can still be found along streams in the area. The area also was home to Cherokee Indians, who were forced out when the Republic of Texas was founded in 1836.

After the Civil War, Richard B. Hubbard, a former officer in the Confederate Army and owner of a large plantation on what is today a gated community called Hideaway Lake, began searching for a more convenient way to ship the produce grown on his land. Hubbard convinced railroad officials to lay track between nearby Tyler and Mineola. Hubbard's brother-in-law, Elijah Lindsey, anticipating growth around the new railroad, opened the fledgling community's first general store in 1871, and Lindale had its start; Lindsey was elected the town's first mayor a year later.

In 1996, Lindale's school board banned 32 books from its schools, including To Kill a Mockingbird, because they "conflicted with the values of the community." According to school board president John Offutt, a Baptist minister, the board's action was an attempt to make students adhere to Christian beliefs.

== Geography ==
According to the United States Census Bureau, the town has a total area of 4.0 square miles (10.4 km^{2}), of which 0.04 sq mi (0.1 km^{2}) (0.50%) is covered by water.

== Demographics ==
Historical population
Census	Pop.	Note	%±
1910	658		—
1920	701		6.5%
1930	743		6.0%
1940	820		10.4%
1950	1,105		34.8%
1960	1,285		16.3%
1970	1,631		26.9%
1980	2,180		33.7%
1990	2,428		11.4%
2000	2,954		21.7%
2010	4,818		63.1%
2020	6,059		25.8%
U.S. Decennial Census

=== 2020 census ===
As of the 2020 census, Lindale had a population of 6,059. The median age was 35.9 years. 27.3% of residents were under the age of 18 and 17.8% of residents were 65 years of age or older. For every 100 females there were 89.4 males, and for every 100 females age 18 and over there were 85.2 males age 18 and over.

99.1% of residents lived in urban areas, while 0.9% lived in rural areas.

There were 2,255 households in Lindale, of which 37.8% had children under the age of 18 living in them. Of all households, 53.3% were married-couple households, 12.4% were households with a male householder and no spouse or partner present, and 29.1% were households with a female householder and no spouse or partner present. About 24.5% of all households were made up of individuals and 13.3% had someone living alone who was 65 years of age or older.

There were 2,434 housing units, of which 7.4% were vacant. The homeowner vacancy rate was 1.4% and the rental vacancy rate was 6.6%.

Racial composition as of the 2020 census
Race	Number	Percent
White	4,878	80.5%
Black or African American	398	6.6%
American Indian and Alaska Native	41	0.7%
Asian	82	1.4%
Native Hawaiian and Other Pacific Islander	2	0.0%
Some other race	196	3.2%
Two or more races	462	7.6%
Hispanic or Latino (of any race)	569	9.4%

=== 2000 census ===
As of the 2000 census, 2,954 people, 1,102 households, and 794 families resided in the city. The population density was 736.2 inhabitants per square mile (284.2/km^{2}). The 1,186 housing units had an average density of 295.6 per square mile (114.1/km^{2}). The racial makeup of the town was 88.19% White, 6.91% African American, 0.54% Native American, 0.71% Asian, 2.17% from other races, and 1.49% from two or more races. Hispanics or Latinos of any race were 4.47% of the population.

Of the 1,102 households, 35.8% had children under 18 living with them, 56.9% were married couples living together, 11.3% had a female householder with no husband present, and 27.9% were not families. About 24.9% of all households were made up of individuals, and 11.2% had someone living alone who was 65 or older. The average household size was 2.56 and the average family size was 3.06.

In the city, the age distribution was 26.9% under 18, 7.8% from 18 to 24, 27.1% from 25 to 44, 20.8% from 45 to 64, and 17.3% who were 65 or older. The median age was 37 years. For every 100 females, there were 84.5 males. For every 100 females 18 and over, there were 80.5 males.

The median income for a household in the city was $33,733, and for a family was $38,787. Males had a median income of $31,538 versus $21,250 for females. The per capita income for the city was $14,825. About 9.6% of families and 11.9% of the population were below the poverty line, including 16.1% of those under 18 and 10.9% of those 65 or over.

== Notable people ==
- Paul Baloche, Christian singer-songwriter
- Wally Brewster, United States ambassador to the Dominican Republic, 2013-2017
- Kelli Finglass, director of the Dallas Cowboys Cheerleaders
- Dallas Holm, Christian singer-songwriter
- Miranda Lambert, Grammy Award-winning country music singer-songwriter and third-place finisher on Nashville Star
- Pat Mahomes, Major League Baseball pitcher from 1992 to 2003
- Leonard Ravenhill, British evangelist and author, lived in Lindale in the '80s.
