= Edmonton Drakes =

Former Baseball Team

The Edmonton Drakes were a baseball team in Edmonton, Alberta, Canada. The team played in the 1950s as a part of the Big Four League.
