= Edmonton Cubs =

The Edmonton Cubs are a baseball team located in Edmonton, Alberta, Canada based out of RE/MAX Field.

They played in the Big Four League from 1947 to 1949. The team won the league pennant in 1949.

The Cubs returned in 2012, and now compete in the Sunburst League Baseball Alberta.

In 2019, they won their first Senior AAA provincial championship, winning the five game championship series 3–2 over the Sherwood Park Athletics. The Cubs would go on to win a second provincial championship in 2021, beating the Red Deer Riggers, also 3–2.

They played their home games at John Fry Park until 2019, when they moved to RE/MAX Field where they currently play.

They will host the Baseball Canada Senior AAA Men's National Championship in August 2027.
