= Edmonton Eskimos (baseball) =

Minor league baseball team in Edmonton

- (1909–1914, 1920–1922, 1946–1959); Edmonton, Alberta

Minor league affiliations
- Class: Class A (1953–1954); Class B (1920–1921,1922); Class D (1909–1914)
- League: Western International League (1953–1954); Western International League (1922); Western Canada League (1909–1914, 1920–1921)

Minor league titles
- League titles: 1910 (co-champions with Calgary Bronchos)

Team data
- Previous names: Edmonton Esquimos (1920); Edmonton Gray Birds (1912–1913)
- Ballpark: Diamond Park, Renfrew Park

The Edmonton Eskimos were a Canadian minor league baseball team that played in Edmonton, Alberta, in various leagues between 1909 and 1914, and again from 1920 to 1922. A revived Eskimos team played from 1946 to 1959, and were briefly Western International League members during the 1953 and 1954 seasons.

== Class D years: 1909–1914 ==
The first incarnation of the Eskimos team joined the Western Canada League in 1909, playing against teams from various provinces in western Canada. The league was classified as a Class D league, the lowest minor league level, and the team had to operate under a $750 salary cap.

The team was not particularly successful. In 1910, the team earned a co-championship with the Calgary Bronchos, but the team's overall record across their six seasons was 273-324. The team folded, along with the Western Canada League as a whole, after the 1914 season.

The team was known as the Gray Birds in 1912 and 1913.

== Class B years: 1920–1922 ==
In 1919, after World War I ended, the Western Canada League re-formed. A year later, in 1920, the Eskimos also re-formed and joined the new Western Canada League. They played as the Esquimos for the 1920 season before returning to the original spelling for 1921 and 1922.

The new Western Canada League was a six-team Class B league, two levels higher in the minor league system, and with a $1000 salary cap. The team played in this league for the 1920 and 1921 season, but again had little success, finishing in the bottom half of the league both years.

After the 1921 season, the Western Canada League folded again. Two teams from the WCL (Calgary and Edmonton) joined with two teams from the Pacific Coast International League to form the Western International League, a new Class B league. The WIL was unstable and folded midway through the 1922 season, when Edmonton was in second place out of the four teams. The team folded as well.

The Eskimos played at Diamond Park.

== 1940s and 1950s revival ==
In 1946, John Ducey and business partners leased Renfrew Park and assumed operation of Edmonton's semi-professional three-team league. Ducey managed the Eskimos during the league's 1946 season. The league operated as the Alberta Senior Amateur Baseball League from 1947 to 1950. Ducey had previously been a bat boy for the Eskimos in the 1921 and 1922 seasons.

Ducey became majority owner of the Eskimos in 1951, and searched for a new league to join. During the 1953 and 1954 season, the Eskimos played in the Western International League. In the Class-A league, they won 141 games and lost 124 across their two seasons until the league folded in 1954.

In 1955, Ducey organized the semi-professional Western Canada Baseball League, which later became the Canadian-American Baseball League. He collaborated with USC Trojans baseball coach Rod Dedeaux to bring former college players to Alberta. In the 1957 season, the Eskimos' roster included four USC Trojans alumni including future Major League player Ron Fairly. The Eskimos were Canadian champions that season, and placed second to Japan at the 1957 Global Series in Detroit.

When the Canadian-American Baseball League collapsed following the 1959 season, Ducey ceased operation of the Eskimos instead of joining a new semi-professional league without a team based in Calgary.
