= Mahomes (disambiguation) =

Patrick Mahomes (born 1995) is an American football quarterback.

Mahomes may also refer to:

- Brittany Mahomes (born 1995), American sports team owner and retired soccer player, wife of Patrick Mahomes
- Pat Mahomes (born 1970), American retired baseball player, father of Patrick Mahomes
- "Mahomes", a 2021 song by Migos from the album Culture III
