= Marshall Brown (basketball, born 1918) =

American basketball player

Personal information
- Born: June 28, 1918 Troup, Texas, U.S.
- Died: August 20, 2008 (aged 90) Tyler, Texas, U.S.
- Listed height: 6 ft 3 in (1.91 m)
- Listed weight: 170 lb (77 kg)

Career information
- High school: Whitehouse (Whitehouse, Texas)
- College: Lon Morris College (1936–1938); Texas Tech (1938–1940)
- Position: Forward

Career history

Playing
- 1945: Cleveland Allmen Transfers

Coaching
- 1959–1978: Stephen F. Austin

Career highlights
- As coach: 5× Lone Star Conference championships

Marshall Earl Brown (June 28, 1918 – August 20, 2008) was an American professional basketball player, minor league baseball player, and college basketball coach.

== Basketball career ==
He is best known for being the head men's basketball coach at Stephen F. Austin State University between 1959 and 1978 in which he compiled an overall record of 345 wins and 168 losses. His wins are the most in school history, and during his tenure he won five Lone Star Conference championships. Brown also led the Lumberjacks to five NAIA Tournament appearances, with his best finish coming in 1971–72: that season, his team went 31–3 overall en route to a third-place finish at the national tournament, losing in the semifinal to eventual national champion Kentucky State 87 to 82. The 31 wins was a school record that stood until 2013–14, and the Lumberjacks scored 100+ points in a game 11 times that season. Brown also coached at the high school and junior college levels.

As a basketball player, Brown played at Lon Morris College after graduating from Whitehouse High School (Whitehouse, Texas) in 1936. He transferred to Texas Tech and played for the Red Raiders, where he graduated in 1940. Professionally, Brown played for the National Basketball League's Cleveland Allmen Transfers in 10 games during the 1945–46 season. He averaged 3.6 points per game. In 2003, Brown was inducted into the Stephen F. Austin Hall of Fame.

== Baseball career ==
Marshall Brown played semi-professional baseball during most of the 1940s. He was an outfielder and played for the Lamesa Lobos (1940–1941), Pampa Oilers (1942), Tyler Trojans (1946), and Kilgore Drillers (1947–1948, 1950). His career batting average was .324 and he hit 47 home runs.
