= Patrick Mahomes =

American football player (born 1995)

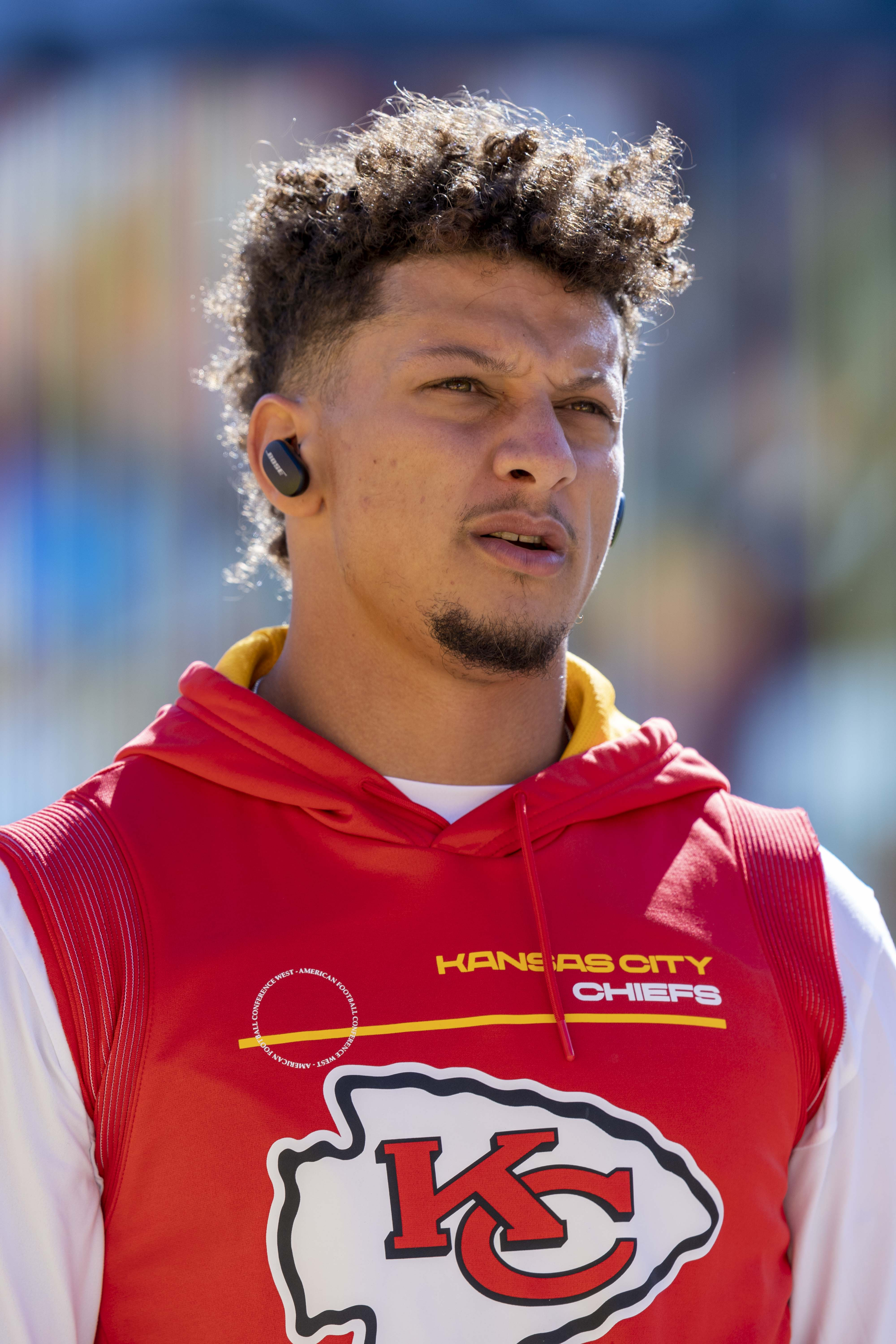
- Mahomes with the Kansas City Chiefs in 2021

No. 15 – Kansas City Chiefs
- Position: Quarterback
- Roster status: Active

Personal information
- Born: September 17, 1995 (age 31); Tyler, Texas, U.S.
- Listed height: 6 ft 2 in (1.88 m)
- Listed weight: 225 lb (102 kg)

Career information
- High school: Whitehouse (Whitehouse, Texas)
- College: Texas Tech (2014–2016)
- NFL draft: 2017: 1st round, 10th overall pick

Career history
- Kansas City Chiefs (2017–present)

Awards and highlights
- 3× Super Bowl champion (LIV, LVII, LVIII); 3× Super Bowl MVP (LIV, LVII, LVIII); 2× NFL Most Valuable Player (2018, 2022); NFL Offensive Player of the Year (2018); 2× First-team All-Pro (2018, 2022); Second-team All-Pro (2020); 6× Pro Bowl (2018–2023); NFL passing yards leader (2022); 2× NFL passing touchdowns leader (2018, 2022); Sports Illustrated Sportsperson of the Year (2020); NCAA passing yards leader (2016); Second-team All-Big 12 (2016); Texas Tech Ring of Honor; NFL records: Career passing yards per game: 283.9 (Note: minimum 1,500 pass attempts); Passing touchdowns in a single postseason: 11 (2021) (tied) (Note: Tied with Joe Flacco in 2012 and Joe Montana in 1989.); Total yards by a quarterback in a season: 5,614 (2022); NCAA (FBS) records: Most offensive yards in a game: 819; Most passing yards in a game: 734 (tied) (Note: With Connor Halliday)

Career NFL statistics as of Week 10, 2026
- Passing attempts: 4,971
- Passing completions: 3,292
- Completion percentage: 66.2%
- TD–INT: 286–89
- Passing yards: 38,324
- Passer rating: 101.1
- Rushing yards: 2,765
- Rushing touchdowns: 20
- Stats at Pro Football Reference

Patrick Lavon Mahomes II (/məˈhoʊmz/ mə-HOHMZ; born September 17, 1995) is an American professional football quarterback for the Kansas City Chiefs of the National Football League (NFL). After becoming the Chiefs' starting quarterback in 2018, he led the team to seven consecutive AFC Championship Game appearances and five Super Bowl appearances, winning three. He is one of only five quarterbacks in NFL history to win three or more Super Bowls as a starter. Mahomes is widely regarded as one of the greatest quarterbacks of all time. He is often considered the best quarterback of his generation, with many outlets ranking him as the league's top player at the position.

Mahomes played college football for the Texas Tech Red Raiders, winning the Sammy Baugh Trophy as a junior after leading the FBS in passing yards and total touchdowns. He was selected 10th overall by the Kansas City Chiefs in the 2017 NFL draft and spent his rookie season as the backup to Alex Smith. In 2018, after the Chiefs traded Smith, Mahomes became the starter and threw for 5,097 yards, 50 touchdowns, and 12 interceptions. He became the first quarterback to achieve over 5,000 passing yards in both college and the NFL, and joined Peyton Manning as the only players to record 5,000 passing yards and 50 touchdowns in an NFL season. For his performance in his first season as a starter, he won the NFL Offensive Player of the Year and NFL Most Valuable Player awards, becoming one of four black quarterbacks to win the AP MVP award. (Note: The other three were Lamar Jackson, Cam Newton, and Steve McNair.)

In the 2019 season, Mahomes led the Chiefs to their first Super Bowl in 50 years, winning Super Bowl LIV. Mahomes was awarded the Super Bowl MVP for his performance, becoming the youngest quarterback and the second Black quarterback to earn the honor. (Note: The first black quarterback to win the award was Doug Williams in Super Bowl XXII.) In 2020, Mahomes signed a 10-year contract extension worth over $450 million, making it one of the largest contracts in sports history. That season, the Chiefs returned to the Super Bowl but lost in Super Bowl LV. In the 2022 season, Mahomes led the league in passing yards and touchdowns, won NFL MVP, and earned Super Bowl MVP after winning Super Bowl LVII. He won his third Super Bowl MVP after winning Super Bowl LVIII the following year, leading the Chiefs to back-to-back titles. In the 2024 season, he led the Chiefs to their third straight Super Bowl but lost Super Bowl LIX, falling short of a historic three-peat. Mahomes was among Time's 100 most influential people in the world in 2020, 2023 and 2024 which is tied for the second most selections for a professional athlete.

== Early life ==
Patrick Lavon Mahomes was born on September 17, 1995, in Tyler, Texas. His father is Pat Mahomes, a former Major League Baseball (MLB) pitcher, and his mother is Randi Martin. Mahomes has a younger brother, Jackson, who is a social media influencer. Mahomes's parents got divorced in 2006. His half-brother through his father, Graham Walker, plays football at Rice University after transferring from Brown University. He is also the godson of former MLB pitcher LaTroy Hawkins, who was his father's teammate on the Minnesota Twins. Mahomes is biracial. His father is black and his mother is white.

Mahomes attended Whitehouse High School in Whitehouse, Texas. He played football, baseball, and basketball. Mahomes believes that training in pitching and playing basketball improved his quarterback skills.

Growing up, Mahomes was a fan of the Dallas Cowboys.

In football, he had 4,619 passing yards, 50 passing touchdowns, 948 rushing yards, and 15 rushing touchdowns as a senior in high school. In baseball, he threw a no-hitter with 16 strikeouts in a game his senior year. He was named the Maxpreps Male Athlete of the Year for 2013–2014.

Mahomes was rated by Rivals.com as a three-star football recruit and was ranked as the 12th best dual-threat quarterback in his class. He received offers from Texas Tech, Rice, and Houston. He committed to Texas Tech University. Mahomes was also a top prospect for the 2014 Major League Baseball draft, but he was not expected to be selected high due to his commitment to Texas Tech. He was selected by the Detroit Tigers in the 37th round of the 2014 MLB draft, but he did not sign a contract.

== College career ==
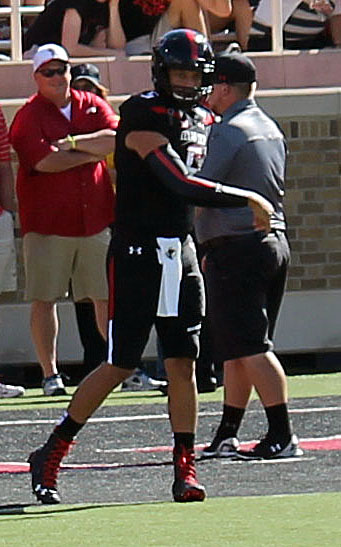
Mahomes at Texas Tech in 2014

=== Freshman year ===
Mahomes entered his freshman season at Texas Tech as a backup to Davis Webb. In the Red Raiders' fourth game, he saw his first career action against the Oklahoma State Cowboys after Webb left the game with an injury, completing two of five passes for 20 yards for one touchdown and an interception. After Webb was again injured, Mahomes started his first career game against the Texas Longhorns. He completed 13 of 21 passes for 109 yards in the 34–13 loss. Mahomes remained the starter for the season's final three games. Against the Baylor Bears, he threw for a Big 12 freshman record 598 yards with six touchdowns and one interception in the 48–46 loss. His 598 passing yards were the most by a Texas Tech quarterback since Graham Harrell had 646 passing yards in 2007. For the season, he passed for 1,547 yards, 16 touchdowns, and four interceptions in seven games.

Mahomes split time with the Texas Tech baseball team, where he was a relief pitcher.

=== Sophomore year ===
Mahomes began his sophomore season at Texas Tech as the starting quarterback. Mahomes helped lead the Red Raiders to a 7–6 season with numerous productive outings throughout the season. He recorded ten games going over 350 passing yards, including four games going over 400. He passed for at least three touchdowns in eight of the games, including a five-touchdown performance against the Iowa State Cyclones on October 10. Overall, in the 2015 season, he led the Big 12 Conference with 364 pass completions on 573 attempts for 4,653 yards, 36 touchdowns, and 15 interceptions.

Mahomes appeared in three games as a baseball player, recording no hits in two at bats, and three runs allowed, as a pitcher.

=== Junior year ===
Prior to the start of the 2016 season, Mahomes announced that he was leaving baseball to focus on football.

Mahomes had a very productive junior season. In the month of September alone, Mahomes passed for 18 touchdowns to three interceptions while rushing for four touchdowns. He averaged 442.5 passing yards per game that month, which included a 540-yard game against the Arizona State Sun Devils in the Red Raiders' second game. Mahomes started the month of October with 504 passing yards, two passing touchdowns, and three rushing touchdowns in a losing effort to the Kansas State Wildcats. On October 22, Mahomes set multiple NCAA, Big 12, and school records in a 66–59 loss to the Oklahoma Sooners at home. Mahomes broke the NCAA FBS records for single-game total offense with 819 yards. He tied the NCAA record for single game passing yards with 734. He fell one attempt short of the record for most attempts at 88. Overall, the game set NCAA records for most combined yards of total offense with 1,708 combined passing yards, and total offense by two players (the other was Oklahoma quarterback Baker Mayfield). The 125 combined points are the second most all time involving a ranked team. Following the Oklahoma game, the Red Raiders defeated the TCU Horned Frogs before dropping three consecutive games to finish outside bowl eligibility with a 5–7 record. In his final game with Texas Tech, Mahomes finished with 586 passing yards and six touchdowns in a 54–35 victory over the Baylor Bears.

Mahomes finished the season leading the country in yards per game (421), passing yards (5,052), total offense (5,312), points responsible for (318), and total touchdowns (53). For his performance, he was awarded the Sammy Baugh Trophy, given annually to the nation's top college passer, joining head coach Kliff Kingsbury, Graham Harrell, and B. J. Symons as other Red Raiders to have won the award. He was named an Academic All-America second team by the College Sports Information Directors of America.

Mahomes announced on January 3, 2017, that he would forgo his senior year and enter the NFL draft.

== Professional career ==
=== Pre-draft ===
External videos
- Patrick Mahomes's NFL Combine workout
- Patrick Mahomes's 40-yard dash
- Mahomes's NFL Combine Press Conference
- Mahomes's Texas Tech Pro Day workout

Mahomes was projected to be a first- or second-round pick by the majority of analysts and scouts. During the throwing drills at the NFL Scouting Combine, his passes were clocked at 60 mph, tying Logan Thomas and Bryan Bennett for the fastest pass ever recorded there. Mahomes was ranked second best quarterback by SI.com, third by ESPN, and fourth by NFLDraftScout.com. Representatives from 28 NFL teams attended his pro day at Texas Tech. He became one of the fastest rising prospects during the draft process and had 18 private workouts and official team visits, the most for any prospect in 2017. Among the coaches that he had workouts and visits with were the Arizona Cardinals head coach Bruce Arians, New Orleans Saints head coach Sean Payton, Cincinnati Bengals quarterbacks coach Bill Lazor, and coaches from the Los Angeles Chargers, Cleveland Browns, Chicago Bears, and Pittsburgh Steelers.

Pre-draft measurables
Height	Weight	Arm length	Hand span	Wingspan	40-yard dash	10-yard split	20-yard split	20-yard shuttle	Three-cone drill	Vertical jump	Broad jump	Wonderlic
6 ft 2 in (1.88 m)	225 lb (102 kg)	33 1/4 in (0.84 m)	9 1/4 in (0.23 m)	6 ft 6 1/2 in (1.99 m)	4.80 s	1.59 s	2.80 s	4.08 s	6.88 s	30 in (0.76 m)	9 ft 6 in (2.90 m)	24
All values from NFL Combine

External videos
- Chiefs select Mahomes 10th overall
- Mahomes received call from Chiefs

=== 2017 season ===
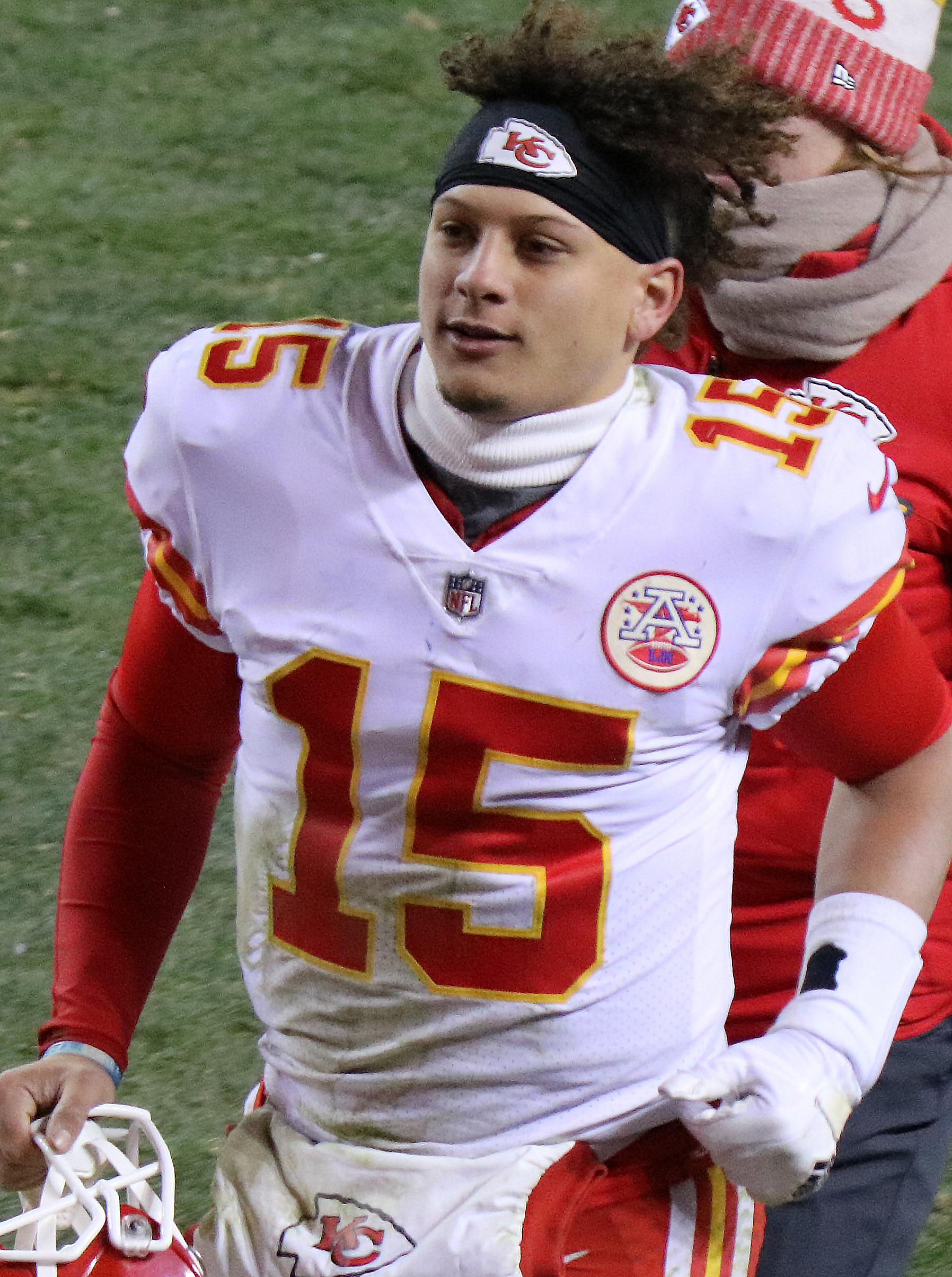
Mahomes in 2017

The Kansas City Chiefs selected Mahomes in the first round (10th overall) of the 2017 NFL draft. The Chiefs, originally slated to have the 27th overall selection, traded up in the draft with the Buffalo Bills for the 10th overall selection. The Chiefs traded their first-round pick and a third-round pick in 2017, and the Chiefs' first-round pick in the 2018 NFL draft for the selection. He was the first quarterback selected by the Chiefs in the first round since selecting Todd Blackledge seventh overall in the 1983 NFL draft. On July 20, 2017, the Chiefs signed Mahomes to a guaranteed four-year, $16.42 million contract that included a signing bonus of $10.08 million.

The Chiefs announced on December 27 that, with the AFC's fourth seed in the playoffs secured, they would rest starter Alex Smith and give Mahomes his first career start in their week 17 game against the Denver Broncos on December 31. Mahomes played most of the game and helped lead the Chiefs to a 27–24 win, completing 22 of 35 passes for 284 yards and one interception in his NFL debut.

=== 2018 season ===
On January 30, 2018, the Chiefs announced they had agreed to trade Smith to the Washington Redskins, elevating Mahomes as the new starting quarterback. In his first game as the Chiefs starting quarterback, the Chiefs beat the division rival Los Angeles Chargers by a score of 38–28. Mahomes threw for 256 yards and four touchdowns with no interceptions and a 127.5 passer rating and was named AFC Offensive Player of the Week. His first career touchdown came on a 58-yard pass to wide receiver Tyreek Hill in the first quarter.

The following week against the Pittsburgh Steelers, Mahomes threw for 326 yards, six touchdowns, no interceptions, and a passer rating of 154.8 in the 42–37 victory. After throwing his fifth touchdown in the game, he broke the NFL record for most touchdown passes in a quarterback's first three career games. His sixth touchdown pass broke the NFL record for touchdown passes in a season's first two weeks. For his performance against the Steelers, Mahomes won his second consecutive AFC Offensive Player of the Week award, the first quarterback since Tom Brady in 2011 to start the season with back-to-back player of the week awards. Mahomes was named AFC Offensive Player of the Month for September.

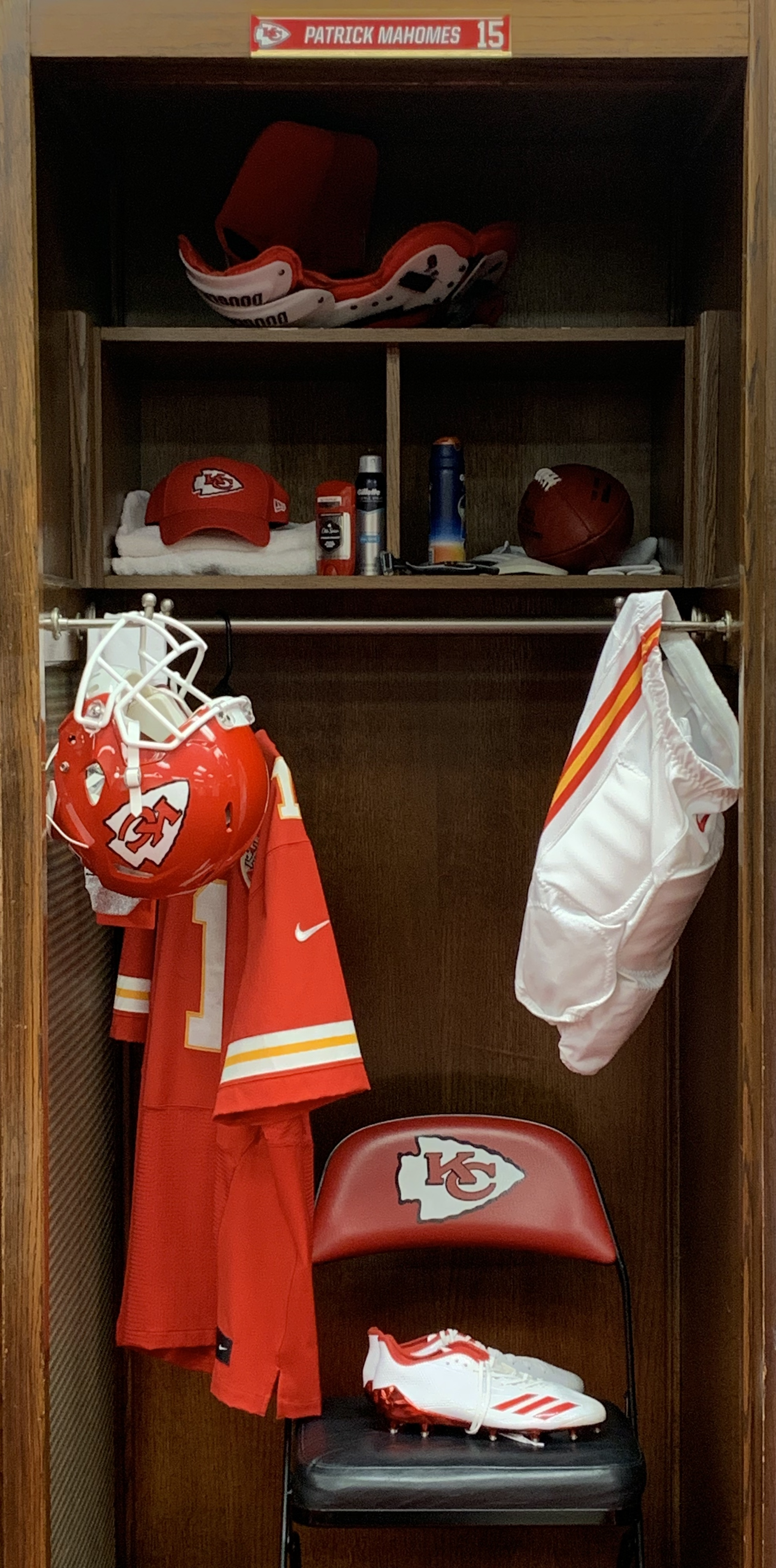
Mahomes's locker at Arrowhead Stadium

In week 4, against the Denver Broncos on Monday Night Football, he passed for 304 yards and a touchdown and had one rushing touchdown in the 27–23 comeback victory. In week 6, against the New England Patriots, he passed for 352 yards, four touchdowns, and two interceptions in a 43–40 loss on Sunday Night Football. In the following game, Mahomes and the Chiefs bounced back with a 45–10 victory over the Cincinnati Bengals. In the victory, he passed for 358 yards, four touchdowns, and one interception. In the next game, a 30–23 win over the Broncos, Mahomes recorded a third consecutive game with four passing touchdowns on 303 passing yards and one interception. During Monday Night Football against the Los Angeles Rams in week 11, Mahomes finished with 478 passing yards, six touchdowns, and three interceptions as the Chiefs lost 54–51. The loss marked the first time in NFL history where a team put up at least 50 points and lost. His 478 passing yards were the most for a single game by any quarterback for the 2018 season.

Following an 89-yard touchdown pass to wide receiver Demarcus Robinson in a week 17 game against the Oakland Raiders, Mahomes joined Peyton Manning as the only quarterbacks in NFL history to throw for 5,000 yards and 50 touchdowns. Additionally, he became one of seven players in NFL history with 5,000 passing yards in a season. He finished second in passing yards to Ben Roethlisberger. He became the first Chief since Len Dawson in 1966 to lead the league in passing touchdowns. He helped lead the Chiefs to a 12–4 record and their third straight division title.

On January 12, 2019, the Chiefs defeated the Indianapolis Colts 31–13 in the Divisional Round, giving the Chiefs their first home playoff win since the 1993 season. Mahomes threw for 278 yards with no interceptions and rushed for one touchdown. The win allowed the Chiefs to host the first AFC Championship held at Arrowhead Stadium. Mahomes passed for 295 yards and three touchdowns, but the Chiefs lost to the Patriots in overtime 37–31.

Mahomes's performance for the season earned multiple awards. He was named to the 2019 Pro Bowl, he was named First Team All–Pro, 2019 Best NFL Player ESPY Award, and was named Kansas City Club 101 Awards AFC Offensive Player of the Year. He was also named the NFL MVP, the first winner for the Chiefs in franchise history. He was ranked as the fourth-best player by his peers on the NFL Top 100 Players of 2019.

=== 2019 season ===
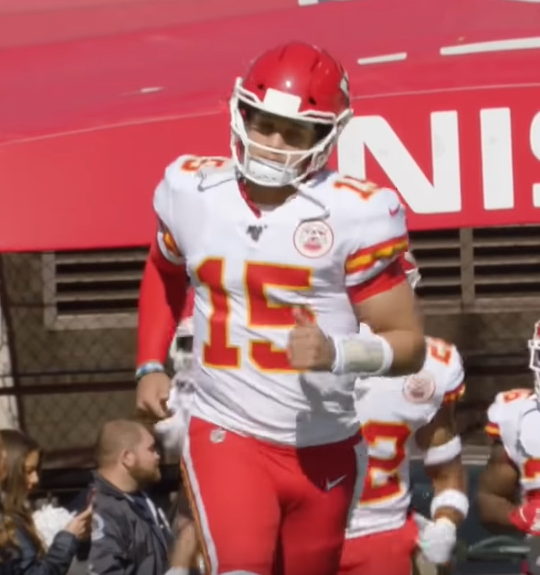
Mahomes in a game against the Tennessee Titans, 2019

Playing against the Jacksonville Jaguars in the season opener, Mahomes threw for 378 yards and three touchdowns in the 40–26 win despite star receiver Tyreek Hill's injury in the first quarter and Mahomes's second quarter ankle sprain. In week 2 against the Oakland Raiders, Mahomes threw for 278 yards and four touchdowns in the second quarter alone, the most passing yards in any quarter since 2008. Mahomes finished the game with 443 yards and was named AFC Offensive Player of the Week. For the second consecutive season, Mahomes was named AFC Offensive Player of the Month for September after leading the Chiefs to a 4–0 start (10 passing touchdowns with no interceptions). Mahomes dislocated his patella in week 7 against the Denver Broncos. The following day, an MRI revealed no significant structural damage. He was initially expected to miss at least three weeks. He returned two weeks later against the Tennessee Titans, throwing for 446 yards and three touchdowns, losing 35–32. Mahomes ran for a career-high 59 yards, but threw for a career-low (for games he finished) 182 yards in the Chiefs' week 11 victory over the Los Angeles Chargers. In a week 16 win over the Chicago Bears on Sunday Night Football, Mahomes celebrated by counting to 10 on his fingers, alluding to the fact that he was the 10th overall pick in the 2017 draft and that the Bears could have drafted him with the second pick instead of Mitchell Trubisky. He finished the season with 4,031 yards and 26 touchdowns with only five interceptions. He helped lead the Chiefs to their second consecutive 12–4 record and first round bye, as well as their fourth consecutive division title. He was selected to the 2020 Pro Bowl, though he did not play due to his participation in Super Bowl LIV.

In the Divisional Round against the Houston Texans, the Chiefs faced a 24–0 deficit early in the second quarter. The Chiefs then went on a 51–7 run, including 41 unanswered points, to win 51–31. Mahomes threw for 321 yards and a postseason career-high five touchdowns and rushed for 53 yards. In their second AFC Championship, facing the Titans, Mahomes threw for three touchdowns and rushed for a 27-yard touchdown, the second longest run of his career and longest in the playoffs. He sparked a comeback from 17–7 in the second quarter to a 35–24 victory. The Chiefs made their first Super Bowl appearance since Super Bowl IV in 1970. In Super Bowl LIV, the Chiefs trailed 20–10 against the San Francisco 49ers in the fourth quarter with 8:53 remaining. It was their third straight game facing at least a ten-point deficit. With just over seven minutes to play, a successful 49ers challenge of a completed catch left the Chiefs facing 3rd and 15 on their own 35-yard-line. Mahomes asked his coaching staff to call the play Jet Chip Wasp, and successfully completed a deep pass to Tyreek Hill for 44 yards. This shifted momentum towards the Chiefs, who in the remaining minutes of the game went on a 21–0 run, securing their first Super Bowl victory in 50 years. Mahomes threw for 286 yards and two touchdowns, with two interceptions, and rushed for another 29 yards and touchdown run and was named Super Bowl MVP. He was the youngest quarterback and third-youngest player in NFL history to earn the award. He became the first player in NFL history to win an NFL MVP and a Super Bowl title before the age of 25. Mahomes also became the third African American quarterback to win a Super Bowl, joining Doug Williams and Russell Wilson. He was ranked fourth by his fellow players on the NFL Top 100 Players of 2020.

=== 2020 season ===
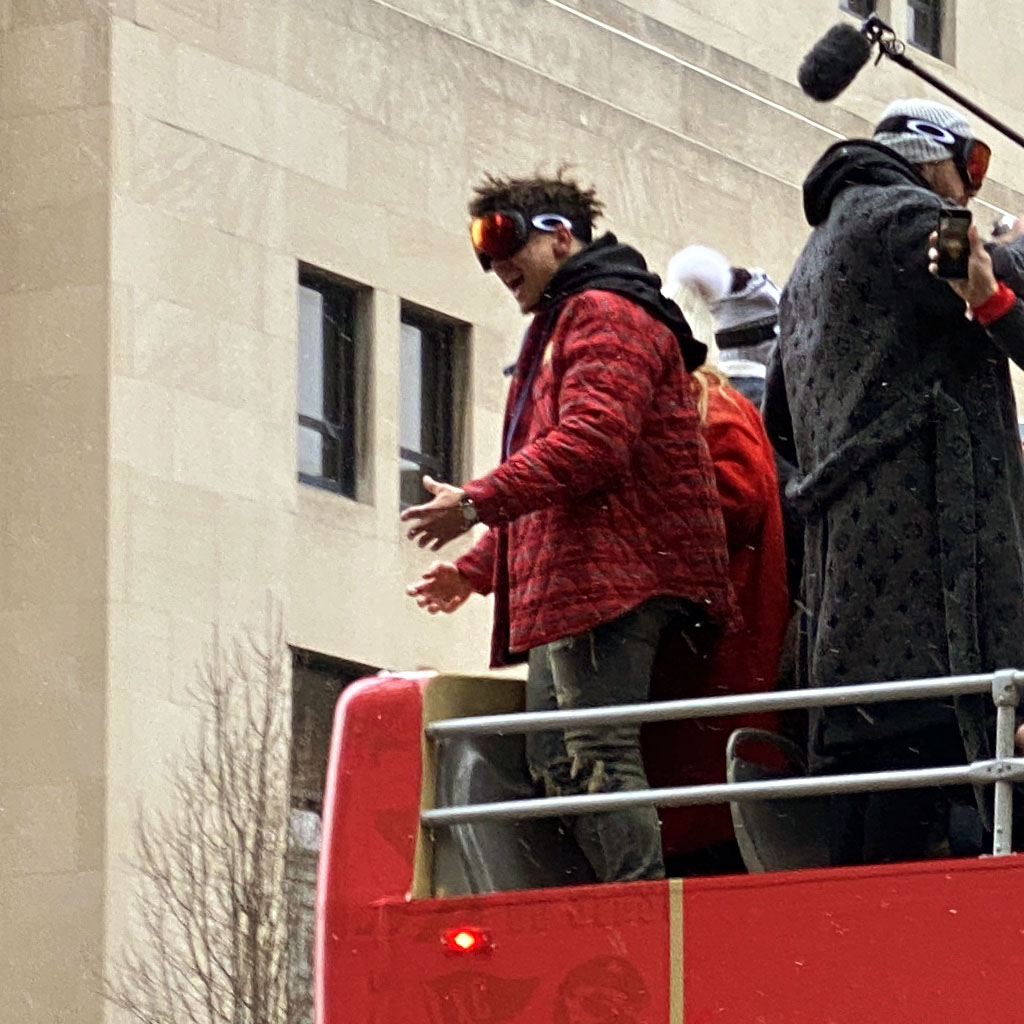
Mahomes at the Super Bowl LIV parade in February 2020

On April 30, 2020, the Chiefs picked up the fifth-year option on Mahomes's contract. On July 6, he signed a ten-year extension worth $477 million with an additional $26 million in potential bonuses for a total of $503 million. The contract extended through the 2031 season. At the time of the signing, it was the largest contract in professional sports history, surpassing Mike Trout's 12-year, $426.5 million contract with the Los Angeles Angels. Mahomes became the first professional athlete to have a half-billion dollar contract. Soccer players Lionel Messi and Cristiano Ronaldo and baseball players Shohei Ohtani and Juan Soto have since surpassed the contract amount.

In the Chiefs' week 2 win over the Los Angeles Chargers, Mahomes achieved his fourth fourth-quarter comeback. The Chiefs trailed 17–9 entering the fourth quarter before winning in overtime 23–20. The comeback was the NFL record sixth time he overcame a 10+ point deficit to win. In a week 3 win over the Baltimore Ravens, he threw for 385 passing yards, passing for four touchdowns and rushing for one. In the game, he became the fastest quarterback to surpass 10,000 career yards. It took him 34 games to eclipse Kurt Warner's mark. He was named AFC Offensive Player of the Week. In week 8, he threw for 416 yards and five touchdowns in a 35–9 victory against the New York Jets. Mahomes was again named AFC Offensive Player of the Week. In a week 9 victory over the Carolina Panthers, he threw for 372 passing yards and four touchdowns. In week 12 against the Tampa Bay Buccaneers, Mahomes led the Chiefs to a 27–24 victory while throwing for 462 yards and three touchdowns. Mahomes was named AFC Offensive Player of the Month for November. In 2020, Sports Illustrated named him one of their Sportspeople of the Year for his activism following the murder of George Floyd and his encouragement for people to vote in the 2020 presidential election. In week 14, against the Miami Dolphins, he tied a career high with three interceptions. Mahomes rested for week 17 after the Chiefs locked up home-field advantage throughout the playoffs. Mahomes finished the 2020 season with 4,740 passing yards, 38 touchdowns and six interceptions. He was named to the Pro Bowl for his accomplishments in the 2020 season.

In the Divisional Round against the Cleveland Browns, Mahomes left the game in the third quarter after being tackled by Browns linebacker Mack Wilson. He was diagnosed with a concussion, and as per NFL rules he was unable to return. The Chiefs would win the game 22–17 with backup quarterback Chad Henne. Later that week, Mahomes announced in a press conference that he had cleared concussion protocol, saying, "Everything has been good. I went through everything; three or four different doctors have said everything is looking good.'"

In the AFC Championship in a highly anticipated matchup against the Buffalo Bills and their dual-threat quarterback Josh Allen, Mahomes threw for 325 yards and three touchdowns, while leading the Chiefs to a 38–24 victory and their second consecutive Super Bowl appearance. Mahomes became the youngest quarterback to start in three straight AFC Championships. The Chiefs hosted the conference championship game for the NFL-record-tying third consecutive year, the other instance was during Andy Reid's tenure with the Philadelphia Eagles.

In Super Bowl LV against the Tampa Bay Buccaneers, Mahomes threw for 270 yards and two interceptions in the game as the Chiefs lost 31–9. It was his first double-digit loss in the NFL, and also the first time since he became the Chiefs starting quarterback that the offense did not score any touchdowns. The Buccaneers defense used two deep safeties to neutralize Mahomes's wide receiver targets. The Chiefs' injury-ravaged offensive line was no match for the Buccaneers' pass rush defense, as Mahomes was pressured on a Super Bowl record 29 of 56 dropbacks while also being sacked three times and hit twice. Despite the pressure, Mahomes still managed to throw several long accurate passes that were dropped by their intended targets resulting in incompletions: one fourth-quarter highlight showed Mahomes throwing a sidearm pass, despite being tripped by Buccaneers defensive end William Gholston, that ultimately hit the facemask of receiver Darrel Williams and was dropped.

Three days after the Super Bowl, Mahomes underwent surgery to repair a turf toe injury he suffered in the divisional round game against the Browns. He was named as the top-ranked player in the NFL by his peers on the NFL Top 100 Players of 2021.

=== 2021 season ===
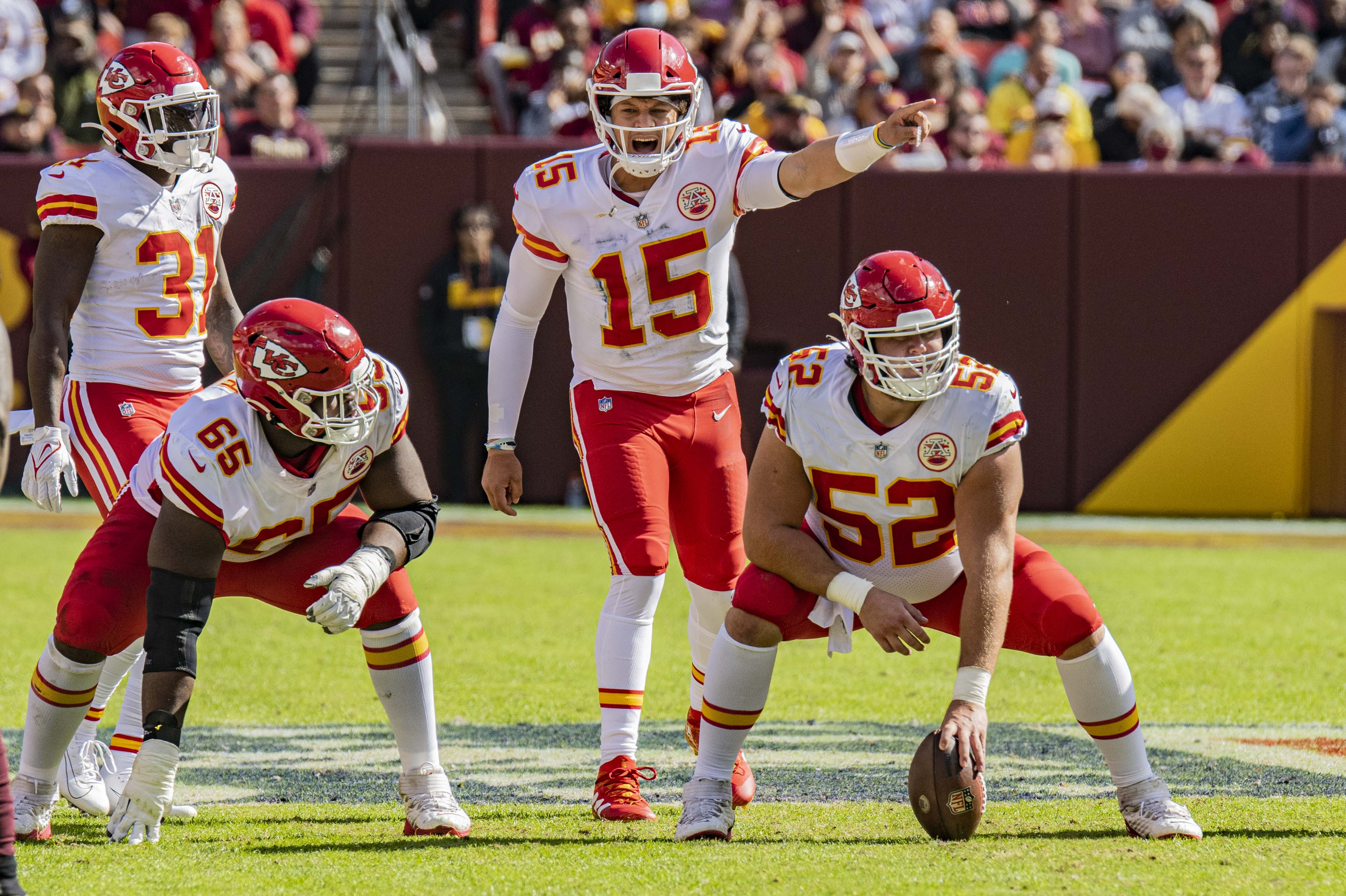
Mahomes directing the Chiefs offense in 2021

On March 12, 2021, Mahomes restructured his contract to save the Chiefs $17 million in salary cap space.

In week 1, Mahomes had three passing touchdowns, one rushing touchdown, and 337 yards in a 33–29 win over the Cleveland Browns, earning AFC Offensive Player of the Week. In the Chiefs' week 2 loss to the Baltimore Ravens, he threw his first interception in the month of September of his career. The 36–35 setback marked Mahomes's first loss in the month of September in his career. In a week 5 loss to the Buffalo Bills, Mahomes set career highs for rushing yards with 61 and passing attempts with 54. The 38–20 loss was only his second loss by double digits in his career and his first in the regular season. Two weeks later, the Chiefs lost to the Tennessee Titans 27–3. The Chiefs' three points were the fewest points a Mahomes-led team scored since he became the starter. It was his sixth consecutive game with an interception, the longest streak of his career. He had two fumbles in the second half which gave him the most turnovers he has had in a season only seven games into the season. In the Chiefs' week 9 victory over the Green Bay Packers, Mahomes threw for 166 yards, which was a career low in games he finished. By not throwing an interception for the first time since week 1, he ended a career worst streak of six consecutive games throwing an interception. Mahomes bounced back the following week in a 41–14 victory over the Las Vegas Raiders, where he threw for 406 yards and five touchdowns, an NFL record-tying third game throwing for at least 400 yards and five touchdowns. He joined Pro Football Hall of Fame quarterbacks Joe Montana, Dan Marino, and Peyton Manning as quarterbacks that accomplished the feat. In the Chiefs' week 15 win over the Los Angeles Chargers, he threw for 410 yards and three touchdowns, including the game winning 34-yard touchdown pass in overtime to Travis Kelce. It was his seventh 400-yard game of his career. He finished the regular season with 4,839 yards, 37 touchdowns, 13 interceptions (a career high), and a 98.5 quarterback rating (a career low for a full season). The Chiefs finished the season 12–5, as well as securing their sixth consecutive AFC West title. He earned a Pro Bowl nomination for the 2021 season.

The Chiefs hosted the Pittsburgh Steelers in the Wild Card Round, the first time he participated at that stage of the playoffs. Mahomes threw for a playoff career-high 404 yards, five touchdowns, and an interception in the 42–21 win. The win marked Mahomes's first postseason game passing for over 400 yards. His 404 passing yards set a franchise record for passing yards in a playoff game. In the Divisional Round against the Bills, Mahomes recorded 378 passing yards and three passing touchdowns to go along with 69 rushing yards and a rushing touchdown during the 42–36 overtime win. In the final seconds of regulation, Andy Reid gave Mahomes a motivational talk and told him to be "The Grim Reaper". After the two-minute warning and in overtime alone, he threw for 177 yards. The game was immediately regarded as one of the greatest playoff games of all time. In the AFC Championship Game against the Cincinnati Bengals, Mahomes threw for 275 yards and three touchdowns, but also threw two interceptions, including one in overtime in the 27–24 loss. He was ranked eighth by his fellow players on the NFL Top 100 Players of 2022.

=== 2022 season ===
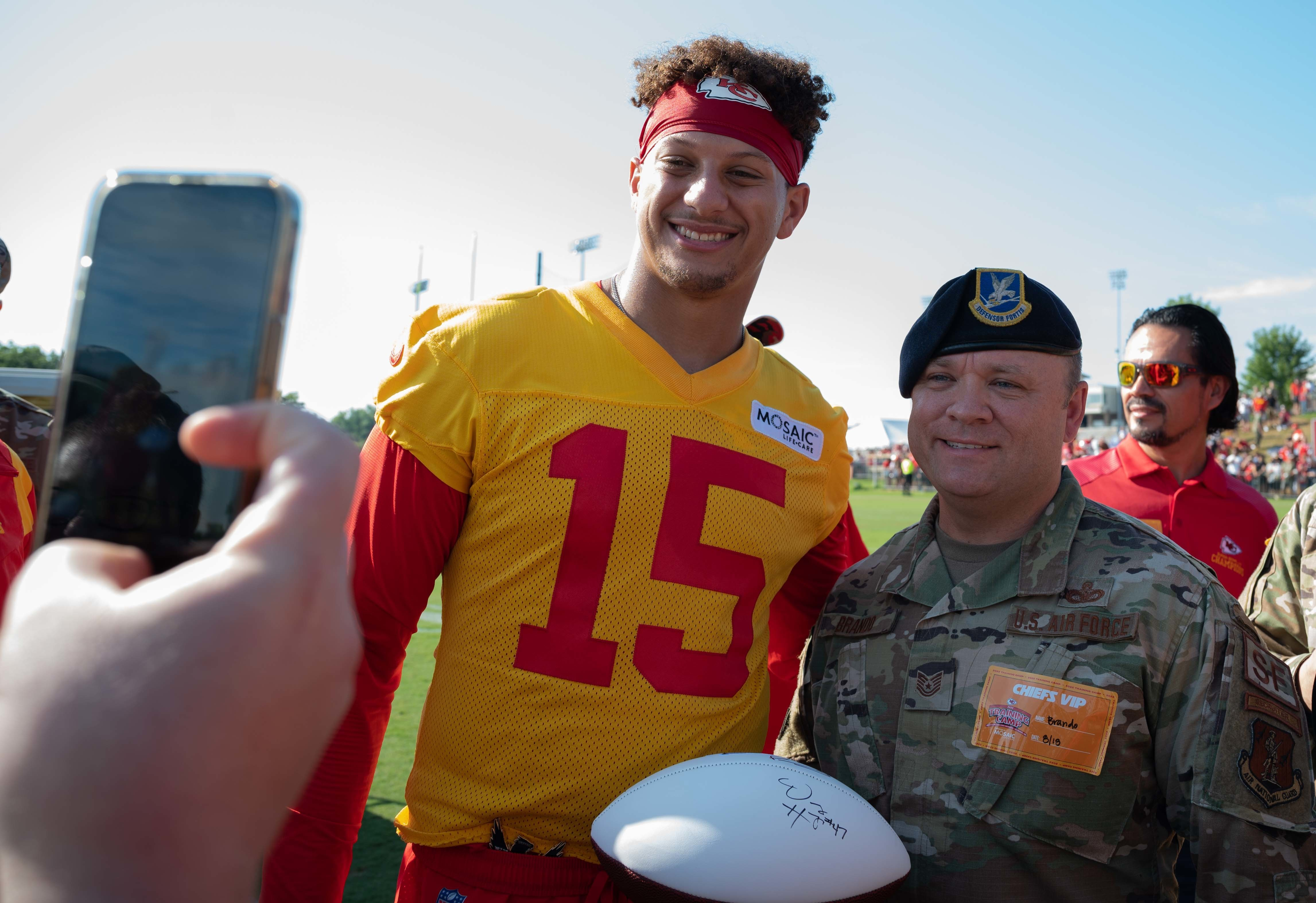
Mahomes taking photos during military appreciation day at training camp in 2022

In Week 1 against the Arizona Cardinals, Mahomes threw for 360 yards and five touchdowns in the Chiefs' 44–21 victory, his sixth 5+ touchdown game. He also had a quarterback rating of 144.2, the third highest of his career and his best since 2020. He was named AFC Offensive Player of the Week for his Week 1 performance. In Week 4, Mahomes threw for 249 yards and three touchdowns in a 41–31 win over the Tampa Bay Buccaneers, earning his second AFC Offensive Player of the Week honors of the season. In Week 7 against the San Francisco 49ers, Mahomes threw for 423 yards and three touchdowns in the 44–23 victory, his seventh career 400-yard game. In Week 8 against the Tennessee Titans, Mahomes set single-game franchise records for pass completions (43) and pass attempts (68) in a single game. In that game, which was only his 71st career start, he broke the NFL record for passing yards in a quarterback's first 75 career starts with 21,596. The following week, his 72nd start, he would break the record for passing touchdowns in a quarterback's first 75 starts with 176. Mahomes was named AFC Offensive Player of the Month for November. In the Chiefs' week 15 game against the Houston Texans, Mahomes ran for his 12th career rushing touchdown, setting a franchise record for rushing touchdowns by a quarterback. He was named to his fifth Pro Bowl for the season. Mahomes reached 5,000 passing yards on the season in a Week 17 win against the Denver Broncos for the second time in his career. He set the NFL record for most total yards in a season by a quarterback (combined passing and rushing) with 5,608. He also broke his own Chiefs' franchise record for passing yards in a season with 5,250.

With the number 1 seed in the AFC, the Chiefs earned a bye week in the first round of the playoffs. In the Chiefs' Divisional Round victory over the Jacksonville Jaguars, a high ankle sprain sidelined Mahomes for much of the first half, but he returned to the game in the second half helping lead the Chiefs to victory. In the AFC Championship game, the Chiefs defeated the Cincinnati Bengals, ending a three-game losing streak (including playoffs) to the team, to advance to their third Super Bowl in four seasons. Against the Philadelphia Eagles in Super Bowl LVII, Mahomes re-aggravated his ankle late in the second quarter as the Chiefs went into halftime trailing by 10. However, Mahomes stayed in the game and led Kansas City to a touchdown on their first three drives of the second half, leading the Chiefs to a 38–35 win over the Eagles. He was awarded his second career Super Bowl MVP for his efforts. Mahomes also finished the season as the Most Valuable Player, and was the league leader in both passing yards and passing touchdowns, becoming the first player in NFL history to achieve all four feats in a season. He also joined Tom Brady and Joe Montana as the only quarterbacks to win multiple regular season and Super Bowl MVPs. Mahomes was ranked as the top player in the NFL by his peers on the NFL Top 100 Players of 2023.

=== 2023 season ===
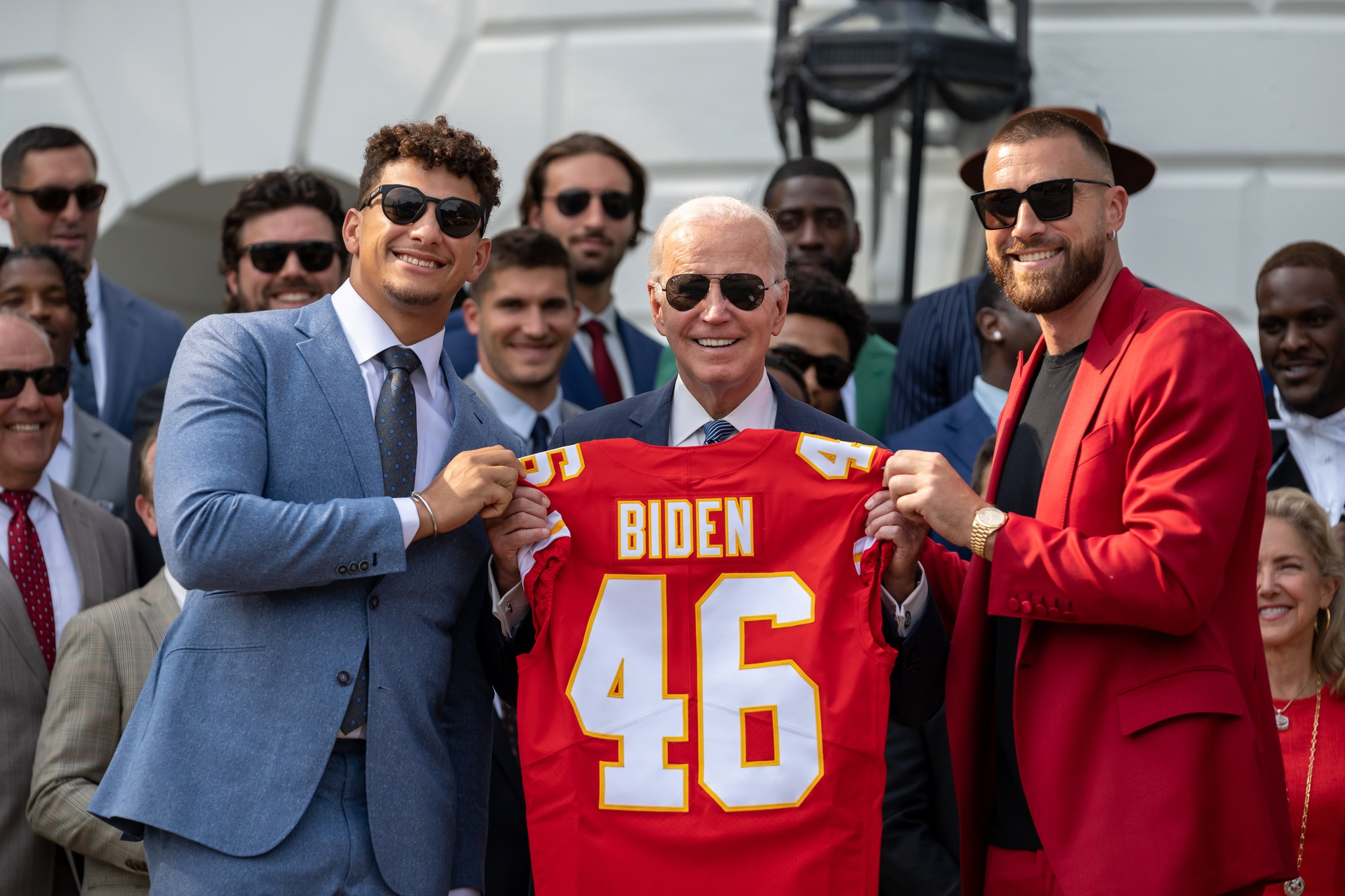
Mahomes and Travis Kelce with President Joe Biden at the White House after winning Super Bowl LVII

On September 18, 2023, the Chiefs and Mahomes agreed to restructure his contract, giving him $210.6 million between 2023 and 2026, the most money in NFL history over a four-season span. In Week 4 against the Jets, Mahomes passed for his 200th career touchdown, becoming the fastest player in NFL history to reach that milestone, having done so in just his 84th start. His 51 rushing yards in the game also allowed him to break Alex Smith's franchise record for most career rushing yards by a quarterback. After defeating the Minnesota Vikings in Week 5, Mahomes became the youngest quarterback in NFL history to defeat all other 31 teams besides their own. In Week 12, Mahomes was 27-of-34 for 298 yards and two touchdowns to overcome a 14-point deficit in a 31–17 win over the Las Vegas Raiders, earning AFC Offensive Player of the Week.

Despite meeting these milestones, Mahomes had his worst statistical season to that point in several categories, including yards per attempt (7.0), passing yards per game (261.4), interceptions (14), and passer rating (92.6). His receivers struggled at several points throughout the season; going into Week 18, they led the league in dropped passes. Despite this, Mahomes set a career-high in completion percentage with 67.2%. Mahomes was notably fined $50,000 for publicly criticizing the referees of the Chiefs' game against the Buffalo Bills, in which they lost 20–17 after a go-ahead touchdown by receiver Kadarius Toney was negated due to Toney lining up offsides. Mahomes ranted as he greeted Josh Allen after the game. In spite of these struggles, the Chiefs once again won the division, resulting in Mahomes and several other starters resting in the final game of the season. Mahomes earned his sixth consecutive Pro Bowl nomination.

The Chiefs' playoff run began with a commanding 26–7 win over the Miami Dolphins at home in subzero temperatures in the wild card round. The next week, Mahomes played his first career road playoff game, scoring a narrow 27–24 win over the Buffalo Bills in the divisional round. This win gave the Chiefs their sixth consecutive AFC Championship Game, the second-most consecutive conference championship games for a franchise of all time (the most is held by the New England Patriots with 8). Against the Bills, Mahomes, along with tight end Travis Kelce, broke the record for most career touchdowns (16) in the playoffs for a quarterback/receiver duo. Mahomes then led the Chiefs to a win on the road against the top-seeded Baltimore Ravens in the AFC Championship to advance to Super Bowl LVIII, marking Mahomes's fourth Super Bowl appearance in five seasons. The win marked Mahomes's 14th career playoff win, tying Terry Bradshaw, John Elway, and Peyton Manning for third place in quarterback playoff wins. In the Super Bowl, Mahomes won his third Super Bowl MVP after throwing for 333 yards with two touchdowns, including the game-winning touchdown pass in overtime to Mecole Hardman, as the Chiefs defeated the San Francisco 49ers 25–22 in just the second Super Bowl in history to go to overtime. Kansas City became the first team to repeat as Super Bowl champions since the New England Patriots nineteen years earlier and Mahomes became the third player with three Super Bowl MVPs. With his victory in the Super Bowl, Mahomes earned his 15th postseason victory, moving into sole possession of third-most in NFL history, only behind Joe Montana and Tom Brady. He was ranked fourth by his fellow players on the NFL Top 100 Players of 2024.

=== 2024 season ===
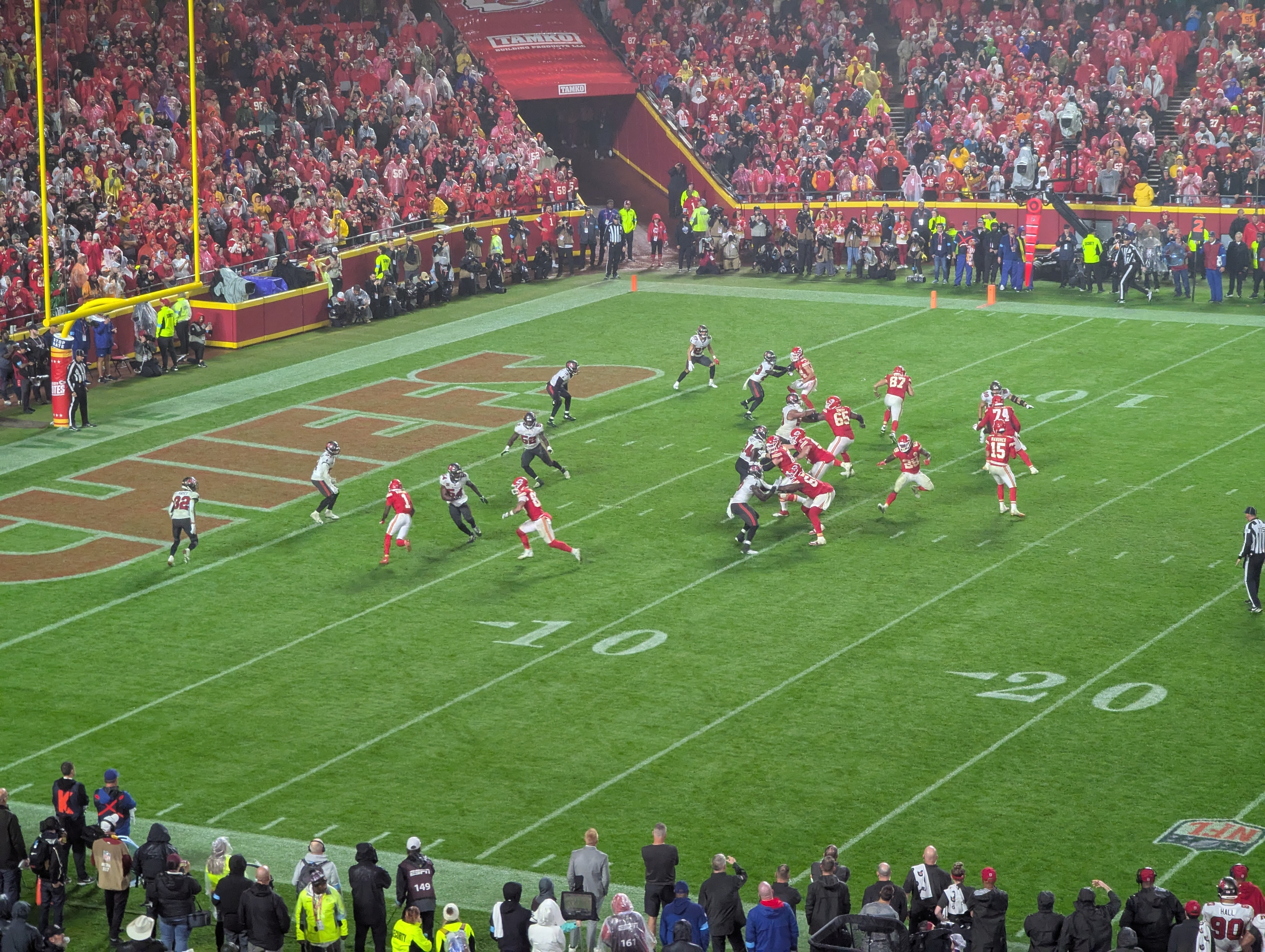
Mahomes (15) throwing a pass to Travis Kelce during a win over the Tampa Bay Buccaneers in 2024

Mahomes and the Chiefs entered the 2024 season looking to become the first team to win three consecutive Super Bowl championships. In the NFL Kickoff Game against the Ravens, Mahomes passed Len Dawson as the Chiefs' all-time passing yards leader in a 27–20 win. In Week 3, Mahomes won his 77th regular season start in a victory against the Atlanta Falcons. With the win, Mahomes passed Tom Brady and Roger Staubach for most victories by a quarterback through their first 100 starts. In Week 8 against the Las Vegas Raiders, Mahomes reached 30,000 career passing yards, doing so in just 103 regular season games. This was faster than any other quarterback in NFL history, surpassing the previous record of 109 games set by Matthew Stafford. Mahomes helped lead the Chiefs to a 9–0 start, tying the best start to a season in franchise history. In Week 11, the team suffered their first setback with a 30–21 loss to the Buffalo Bills. In Week 14, Mahomes helped lead the Chiefs to a ninth consecutive AFC West title with a 19–17 win over the Chargers. With a 29–10 win over the Steelers in Week 17, Mahomes and the Chiefs clinched the top overall seed in the AFC for the postseason. The win marked the 15th regular season victory for the Chiefs, setting a new franchise single-season record. With playoff seeding locked up, Mahomes and other Chiefs starters rested in Week 18. In the 2024 season, Mahomes finished with 3,928 passing yards, 26 passing touchdowns, and 11 interceptions to go with 58 carries for 307 rushing yards and two rushing touchdowns. It was his first season as a starter without 4,000 passing yards or a Pro Bowl selection.

In the Divisional Round, Mahomes helped lead the Chiefs to a 23–14 victory over the Houston Texans. In the AFC Championship against the Bills, Mahomes scored two rushing touchdowns and one passing touchdown, leading the Chiefs to a 32–29 win and becoming the first back-to-back defending champions to return to the Super Bowl. The victory also moved Mahomes to second all-time in playoff wins among quarterbacks, behind Tom Brady. In a rematch of Super Bowl LVII against the Eagles, Mahomes struggled mightily in the first half, throwing for 33 yards, two interceptions (one returned for a touchdown by rookie Cooper DeJean), and a passer rating of 10.7. The Chiefs trailed 34–0 and did not cross midfield until late in the third quarter. Mahomes put up most of his positive statistics after the game was out of reach as many Eagles starters exited the game, finishing with 257 yards, three touchdowns, three turnovers, and a career-high six sacks as the Chiefs lost 40–22. He was ranked fifth by his fellow players on the NFL Top 100 Players of 2025.

=== 2025 season ===
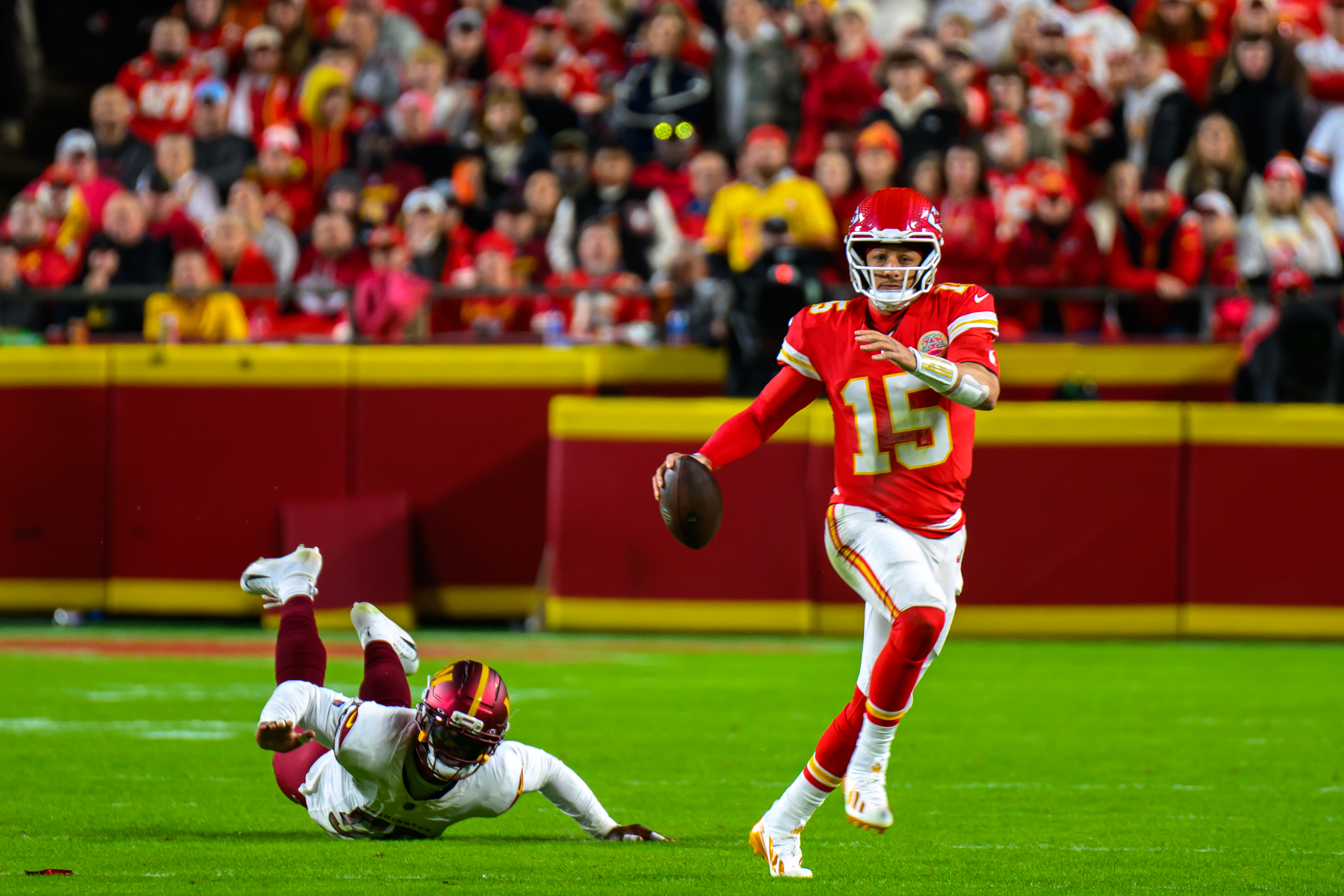
Mahomes during a win over the Washington Commanders in 2025

Mahomes threw his 250th career touchdown in a 37–20 Week 4 win against the Baltimore Ravens. Doing it in his 116th game, he became the fastest to that milestone, beating Aaron Rodgers, who needed 121 games. His performance also earned him AFC Offensive Player of the Week. In Week 6, Mahomes completed 22 of 30 passes for 257 yards and three touchdowns, along with 32 rushing yards and a touchdown, in a 30–17 win over the Detroit Lions, earning his second AFC Offensive Player of the Week honors of the season. On December 14, 2025, the Chiefs lost to the Los Angeles Chargers and were eliminated from playoff contention, marking the first time in Mahomes' NFL career that he would miss the postseason. Late in the game, Mahomes suffered a torn ACL, ending his season. The following day he underwent surgery to repair both his ACL and LCL. Mahomes set career highs in rushing with 422 rushing yards and five rushing touchdowns on the season.

=== 2026 season ===
In the 2026 offseason, Mahomes agreed to a restructured contract that added two years to his contract, running through the 2033 season. Mahomes returned from his ACL injury and started the Chiefs' regular season opener against the Broncos.

Against Indianapolis in Week 2, Mahomes set a new record for consecutive overtime wins in the regular season by a quarterback, passing Jake Plummer. He is now 8-0 in his career.

The Week 6 win over the Chargers was the 100th regular-season one of Mahomes's career. He did it in 131 games, tying Tom Brady for the fewest needed to achieve it.

== Career statistics ==
Legend
	AP NFL MVP
	Super Bowl MVP
	Won the Super Bowl
	NFL record
	Led the league
**Bold**	Career best

=== NFL ===
==== Regular season ====
Year	Team	Games			Passing										Rushing					Fumbles	
Year	Team	GP	GS	Record	Cmp	Att	Pct	Yds	Y/A	Y/G	Lng	TD	Int	Rtg	Att	Yds	Y/A	Lng	TD	Fum	Lost
2017	KC	1	1	1–0	22	35	62.9	284	8.1	284.0	51	0	1	76.4	7	10	1.4	5	0	0	0
2018	KC	16	16	12–4	383	580	66.0	5,097	**8.8**	**318.6**	**89**	**50**	12	**113.8**	60	272	4.5	28	2	9	2
2019	KC	14	14	11–3	319	484	65.9	4,031	8.3	287.9	83	26	5	105.3	43	218	5.1	25	2	3	2
2020	KC	15	15	14–1	390	588	66.3	4,740	8.1	316.0	75	38	6	108.2	62	308	5.0	24	2	5	2
2021	KC	17	17	12–5	**436**	**658**	66.3	4,839	7.4	284.6	75	37	13	98.5	66	381	5.8	32	2	9	4
2022	KC	17	17	14–3	435	648	67.1	**5,250**	8.1	308.8	67	41	12	105.2	61	358	5.9	20	4	5	**0**
2023	KC	16	16	10–6	401	597	67.2	4,183	7.0	261.4	67	27	14	92.6	**75**	389	5.2	25	0	5	3
2024	KC	16	16	**15–1**	392	581	**67.5**	3,928	6.8	245.5	54	26	11	93.5	58	307	5.3	**33**	2	**2**	**0**
2025	KC	14	14	6–8	315	502	62.7	3,587	7.1	256.2	61	22	11	89.6	64	**422**	**6.6**	22	**5**	3	**0**
2026	KC	9	9	7–2	199	298	66.8	2,385	7.7	265.0	59	19	4	106.7	25	100	4.0	15	1	3	**0**
Career		135	135	102–33	3,292	4,971	66.2	38,324	7.7	283.9	89	286	89	101.1	521	2,765	5.3	33	20	44	13

==== Postseason ====
Year	Team	Games			Passing										Rushing					Fumbles	
Year	Team	GP	GS	Record	Cmp	Att	Pct	Yds	Y/A	Y/G	Lng	TD	Int	Rtg	Att	Yds	Y/A	Lng	TD	Fum	Lost
2017	KC	DNP																			
2018	KC	2	2	1–1	43	72	59.7	573	8.0	286.5	54	3	**0**	98.9	5	19	3.8	9	1	2	**0**
2019	KC	3	3	3–0	72	112	64.3	901	8.0	300.3	60	10	2	111.5	**24**	135	5.6	27	**2**	4	**0**
2020	KC	3	3	2–1	76	117	65.0	850	7.3	283.3	**71**	4	2	90.8	13	52	4.0	13	1	**1**	**0**
2021	KC	3	3	2–1	89	122	**73.0**	**1,057**	**8.7**	**352.3**	64	**11**	3	**118.8**	13	117	**9.0**	**34**	1	**1**	**0**
2022	KC	3	3	3–0	72	100	72.0	703	7.0	234.3	29	7	**0**	114.7	12	60	5.0	26	0	**1**	1
2023	KC	4	4	**4–0**	**104**	**149**	69.8	1,051	7.1	262.8	52	6	1	100.3	23	**141**	6.1	28	0	2	**0**
2024	KC	3	3	2–1	55	83	66.3	679	8.2	226.3	50	5	2	101.4	22	82	3.7	15	**2**	3	2
Career		21	21	17–4	511	755	67.7	5,814	7.7	276.9	71	46	10	105.4	112	606	5.4	34	7	14	3

==== Super Bowl ====
Year	SB	Opp.	Passing								Rushing				Result
Year	SB	Opp.	Cmp	Att	Pct	Yds	Y/A	TD	Int	Rtg	Att	Yds	Y/A	TD	Result
2019	LIV	SF	26	42	61.9	286	6.8	2	2	78.1	**9**	29	3.2	**1**	**W** 31–20
2020	LV	TB	26	**49**	53.1	270	5.5	0	2	52.3	5	33	6.6	0	L 31–9
2022	LVII	PHI	21	27	**77.8**	182	6.7	**3**	**0**	**131.8**	6	44	**7.3**	0	**W** 38–35
2023	LVIII	SF	**34**	46	73.9	**333**	7.2	2	1	99.3	**9**	**66**	**7.3**	0	**W** 25–22 (OT)
2024	LIX	PHI	21	32	65.6	257	**8.0**	**3**	2	95.4	4	25	6.3	0	L 40–22
Career			128	196	65.3	1,328	6.8	10	7	86.9	33	197	6.0	1	W−L 3–2

=== College ===
Legend
Led the NCAA

Season	Team	Games			Passing								Rushing			
Season	Team	GP	GS	Record	Cmp	Att	Pct	Yds	Y/A	TD	Int	Rtg	Att	Yds	Avg	TD
2014	Texas Tech	7	4	1−3	105	185	56.8	1,547	8.4	16	**4**	151.2	46	104	2.3	0
2015	Texas Tech	13	13	**7−6**	364	573	63.5	4,653	8.1	36	15	147.2	**131**	**456**	**3.5**	10
2016	Texas Tech	12	12	5−7	**388**	**591**	**65.7**	**5,052**	**8.5**	**41**	10	**157.0**	**131**	260	2.0	**12**
Career		32	29	13−16	857	1,349	63.5	11,252	8.3	93	29	152.0	308	820	2.7	22

== Career highlights ==
=== Awards and honors ===
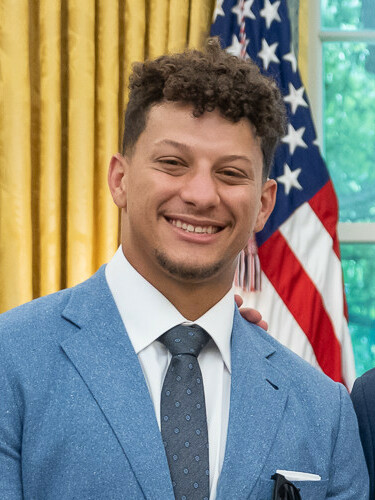
Mahomes at the White House in 2023

NFL

- 3× Super Bowl champion (LIV, LVII, LVIII)
- 3× Super Bowl MVP (LIV, LVII, LVIII)
- 2× NFL Most Valuable Player (2018, 2022)
- NFL Offensive Player of the Year (2018)
- 2× First-team All-Pro (2018, 2022)
- Second-team All-Pro (2020)
- 6× Pro Bowl (2018–2023)
- Pro Bowl Offensive MVP (2018)
- 2× NFL passing touchdowns leader (2018, 2022)
- NFL passing yards leader (2022)
- 2× Total quarterback rating leader: (2018, 2022)
- Bert Bell Award (2018)
- 2× PFWA NFL Most Valuable Player (2018, 2022)
- PFWA NFL Offensive Player of the Year: (2018)
- 2× Sporting News Offensive Player of the Year (2018, 2020)
- FedEx Air Player of the Year (2018)
- Ranked No. 4 in the NFL Top 100 Players of 2019
- Ranked No. 4 in the NFL Top 100 Players of 2020
- Ranked No. 1 in the NFL Top 100 Players of 2021
- Ranked No. 8 in the NFL Top 100 Players of 2022
- Ranked No. 1 in the NFL Top 100 Players of 2023
- Ranked No. 4 in the NFL Top 100 Players of 2024
- Ranked No. 5 in the NFL Top 100 Players of 2025
- Ranked No. 18 in the NFL Top 100 Players of 2026

College

- Sammy Baugh Trophy (2016)
- Second-team All-Big 12 (2016)
- FBS passing yards leader (2016)

Other awards

- Laureus World Sports Awards Breakthrough of the Year (2021)
- 2× Hickok Belt (2018, 2020)
- Sports Illustrated Sportsperson of the Year (2020)
- 3× Best NFL Player ESPY Award (2019, 2023, 2024)
- 2× Best Male Athlete ESPY Award (2023, 2024)
- 3× Time 100 Most Influential People: 2020, 2023, 2024

=== Records ===
==== NFL records ====
- Career passing yards per game (minimum 1,500 attempts): 285.2
- Passing touchdowns in a postseason: 11 (2021) (tied)
- Total touchdowns (passing and rushing) in a postseason: 12 (2019, 2021)
- Total yards (passing and rushing) in a season: 5,608 (2022)
- Fastest to 10,000 career passing yards: 34 games
- Fastest to 20,000 career passing yards: 67 games
- Fastest to 30,000 career passing yards: 103 games
- Fastest to 100 career passing touchdowns: 40 games
- Fastest to 200 career passing touchdowns: 84 games
- Fastest to 250 career passing touchdowns: 116 games
- Consecutive 300-plus passing yard games: 8 (tied)
- Consecutive double digit deficits overcome including playoffs: 6
- Consecutive regular-season overtime wins: 8 (ongoing)

==== Chiefs franchise records ====
- Career passing yards: (35,939)
- Career passing touchdowns: (267)
- Touchdown passes in a game: 6 (2018, tied)
- Touchdown passes in a season: 50 (2018)
- Passing yards in a season: 5,250 (2022)
- Passing yards in a playoff game: 404 (2021–22 playoffs)
- Highest passer rating, single season: 113.8 (2018)
- Highest completion percentage, career: 66.2
- Career rushing touchdowns by a quarterback: 19
- Career rushing yards by a quarterback: 2,665
- Completions in a game: 43 (2022)
- Attempts in a game: 68 (2022)
- Career completions: (3,093)
- Career attempts: (4,673)
- Most passing touchdowns in one game: 6 (twice) (tied with Len Dawson)
- Most games with at least 400 passing yards: 10
- Most games with at least 300 passing yards: 50

==== College records ====
Both records are Division I-FBS records.

- Single-game yards passing: 734 (tied) (vs. Oklahoma on October 22, 2016)
- Single-game yards total offense: 819 (vs. Oklahoma on October 22, 2016)

== Player profile ==
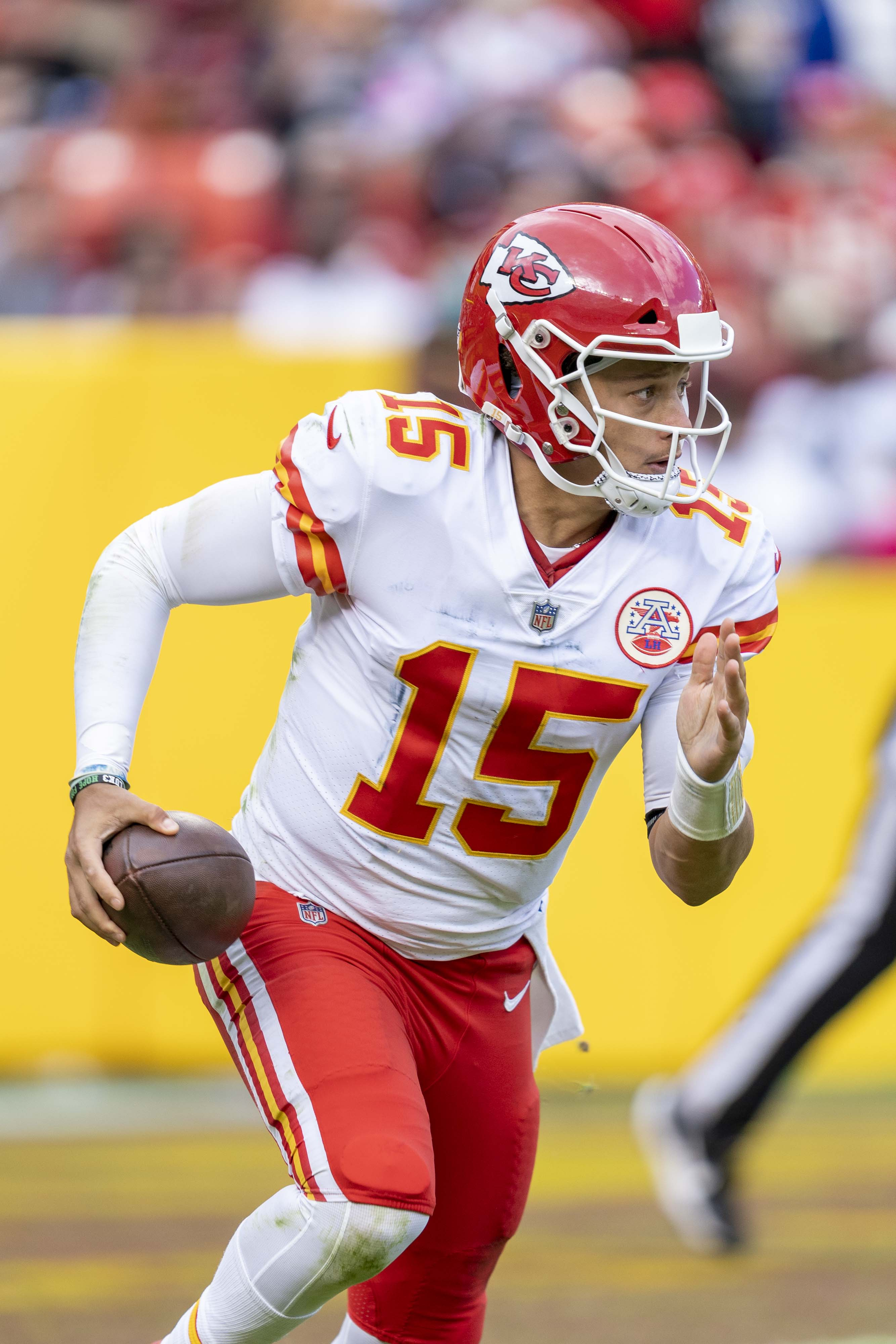
Mahomes scrambling in the pocket

A former baseball pitcher and considered by some a dual-threat quarterback and the "most talented player in the NFL" due to his elusiveness in the pocket, arm strength, running ability, and athleticism despite being a pass-first quarterback, Mahomes is also known for attempting and completing innovative throws, including no-look passes and behind-the-back tosses. FiveThirtyEight also cites his unique and "uncanny" ability to know his receivers' timing and use his athleticism to fool defenders and get his receivers open. Mahomes credits his years playing baseball with developing his arm strength while throwing the football. Ahead of Super Bowl LVII, which was the first Super Bowl to feature two black starting quarterbacks as the Chiefs faced off against Jalen Hurts and the Philadelphia Eagles, Mahomes acknowledged that his creative playing style was inspired by that of Negro league baseball players, especially Satchel Paige, who likewise inspired his father's baseball playing style.

A number of defensive coordinators have cited Mahomes's ability to improvise as one of his key skills. Since Mahomes's breakout 2018 season, NFL general managers and scouts have sought out prospects that can break out of designed plays. Number one overall draft picks Kyler Murray and Bryce Young are regarded as examples of this effect, with the two being highly touted prospects despite lacking traditional size for the position.

== Personal life ==
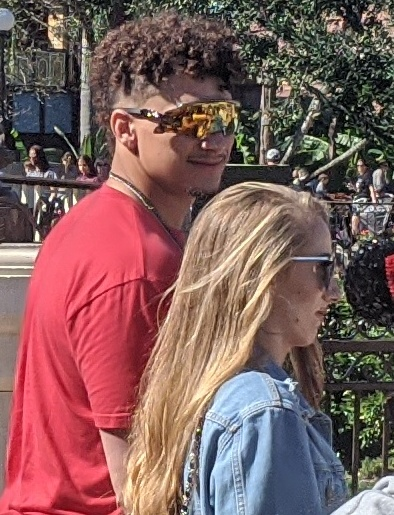
Mahomes with his wife Brittany at the Chiefs Super Bowl Parade at Magic Kingdom in 2020

On September 1, 2020, Mahomes proposed to Brittany Matthews, his high school sweetheart, in a suite in Arrowhead Stadium, the day Mahomes received his Super Bowl LIV championship ring. Matthews had a brief professional soccer career playing for Icelandic club UMF Afturelding and then became a certified personal trainer. She is also a co-owner of the Kansas City Current, a women's professional soccer team in the National Women's Soccer League. The couple married on March 12, 2022. They have three children: two daughters and a son.

Mahomes is an evangelical Christian. His mother said he found his faith when he was in middle school, where he was involved with a youth group at his church. Mahomes has said, "Faith is huge for me ... Before every game, I walk the field and I do a prayer at the goalpost. I just thank God for those opportunities and I thank God for letting me be on a stage where I can glorify Him. The biggest thing that I pray for is that whatever happens, win or lose, success or failure, that I'm glorifying Him."

Mahomes is featured in the NFL Films and Netflix sports documentary series Quarterback, alongside other NFL quarterbacks Kirk Cousins and Marcus Mariota. All three players were filmed during the 2022 season on-and-off the field. The series premiered on Netflix on July 12, 2023. Mahomes's newly established 2PM Productions collaborated on producing the series.

Mahomes plays golf during the offseason. He has participated in several celebrity tournaments, including the American Century Championship since 2020. He participated in the 2022 edition of The Match alongside Josh Allen, losing to Tom Brady and Aaron Rodgers. He also participated in the 2023 edition teaming up with his Chiefs teammate Travis Kelce against Golden State Warriors teammates Stephen Curry and Klay Thompson. Mahomes and Kelce won the match.

In 2025, Mahomes was inducted into the Texas High School Football Hall of Fame.

=== Endorsements ===
Following his 2018 MVP season, Mahomes received multiple endorsement deals. His first contract came from Hunt's (which has never had business ties to the family that owns the Chiefs) upon revealing his love for ketchup. In addition, he has signed endorsement deals with Subway, Oakley, Essentia Water, Hy-Vee, State Farm, DirecTV, Adidas, and Head & Shoulders. He also signed an endorsement contract with Helzberg Diamonds who released a line of necklaces featuring his logo. He was named the cover athlete for Madden NFL 20, becoming the first Chiefs player to be on the cover. He would be named the Madden cover athlete again, along with Tom Brady, two years later for Madden NFL 22. Mahomes and Brady are the first players to be named cover athlete twice. In 2020, he signed an endorsement deal with sports drink maker BioSteel sports drinks. He also became an equity partner in the company. On August 16, 2021, he announced he would be releasing his own signature shoe as part of his endorsement deal with Adidas. The shoe was called the Mahomes 1 Impact FLX and was released on August 23.

In 2022, Mahomes appeared in a commercial for Coors Light. NFL rules prohibit players from endorsing alcohol products, so the product in the commercial was a Coors flashlight instead of beer. In 2023, he appeared in commercials for cellphone provider T-Mobile. Also in 2023, he signed an endorsement deal with the beverage manufacturer Prime.

=== Philanthropy and activism ===
In April 2019, Mahomes announced the establishment of a nonprofit organization called the 15 and the Mahomies Foundation. The nonprofit's website states that it is "dedicated to improving the lives of children".

Following the murder of George Floyd by police officer Derek Chauvin, Mahomes, along with teammate Tyrann Mathieu and several other NFL players, made a video encouraging the NFL to condemn police brutality and violence against black people and to admit it was wrong to silence Colin Kaepernick and Eric Reid for their protests during the playing of the National Anthem.

Mahomes and Mathieu started a voter registration project in Kansas City. The project encouraged residents to register to vote in the 2020 presidential election. He worked with the Chiefs to encourage players to vote. He joined LeBron James' Rock the Vote initiative to encourage people to register and vote.

Mahomes was named to the Time 100 list of most influential people of 2020, 2023, and 2024.

In 2024, Mahomes donated $5 million to his alma mater, Texas Tech, to assist with stadium and football center projects.

=== Business investments ===
In 2020, Mahomes joined the Kansas City Royals ownership group as a minority stakeholder. In 2021, he joined Sporting Club, the ownership group of the Major League Soccer franchise Sporting Kansas City. Mahomes is a member of an ownership group of an upcoming professional pickleball team based in Miami, Florida. The ownership group also includes Naomi Osaka, Nick Kyrgios, and Rich Paul. Mahomes joined the ownership group of the NWSL's Kansas City Current in 2023. His wife has been a member of the ownership group since the team was established. In 2023, Mahomes and Travis Kelce became investors in the Alpine racing team of Formula One.

In 2021, Mahomes became an investor in a group to expand the Whataburger fast food restaurant franchise to Missouri and Kansas. The locations will primarily be in the Kansas City and Wichita metropolitan areas, with multiple other locations in between. As of June 2024, there are 14 Whataburger locations in the Kansas City area, with Mahomes's investment group, called KMO Burgers, operating 11 of them.

In 2024, Mahomes, along with the rest of the ownership group of the Current, expressed interest in bringing a WNBA expansion franchise to Kansas City. They cited the success of the Current, the WNBA expanding to add teams in San Francisco, Portland, and Toronto by 2026, and the WNBA hoping to have 16 teams by 2028. The bid is likely to have competition from other cities like St. Louis and Philadelphia.

In 2025, Mahomes and Travis Kelce opened a steakhouse called 1587 Prime at the Loews Hotel Kansas City.

In January 2026, Patrick Mahomes launched a golf-focused apparel line in partnership with Adidas, further strengthening his long-term endorsement relationship with the brand and marking his first major commercial venture into the golf industry.

== See also ==
- List of AP NFL MVP Award winners
- List of Kansas City Chiefs first-round draft picks
- List of Kansas City Chiefs starting quarterbacks
- List of NCAA major college football yearly total offense leaders
- List of NFL quarterbacks with 5,000 passing yards in a season
- List of starting black NFL quarterbacks
- List of Super Bowl MVPs
- List of Super Bowl starting quarterbacks
- Texas Tech Red Raiders football statistical leaders
