= Marshall Brown =

Marshall Brown may refer to:

- Marshall Brown (musician) (1920–1983), American jazz musician and educator
- Marshall Brown (basketball, born 1918) (1918–2008), American basketball player
- Marshall Brown (basketball, born 1985), American basketball player

== See also ==
- Marshall Browne (1935–2014), Australian crime fiction writer
- Marshall Browns, an East Texas League minor league baseball team in the United States
