= Brittany Mahomes =

American sports team owner (born 1995)

Personal information
- Birth name: Brittany Lynne Matthews
- Date of birth: August 31, 1995 (age 31)
- Place of birth: Whitehouse, Texas, U.S.
- Height: 5 ft 5 in (1.65 m)
- Position: Forward

Youth career
- 2009–2013: Whitehouse High School

College career
Years	Team	Apps	(Gls)
2013–2016	UT Tyler	74	(31)

Senior career*
Years	Team	Apps	(Gls)
2017	Afturelding/Fram	5(0)	(2)
- * Club domestic league appearances and goals

Brittany Lynne Mahomes (née Matthews; born August 31, 1995) is an American sports team co-owner and former soccer player who played as a forward. She is a founding co-owner of the Kansas City Current, a team in the American professional top-division National Women's Soccer League (NWSL).

She is married to Kansas City Chiefs quarterback Patrick Mahomes. They have been married since 2022.

== Early life ==
Mahomes was born in Whitehouse, Texas, where she attended Whitehouse High School. An accomplished soccer player, in her senior year, she was named WHS Offensive MVP and was an All-East Texas forward with 22 goals and five assists.

== Playing career ==
Mahomes did not expect to play collegiate soccer after graduating from high school, but played at the University of Texas at Tyler for the Texas–Tyler Patriots women's soccer team after speaking to players she knew there. At Texas-Tyler, Mahomes was reunited with Whitehouse High School teammate Chestley Strother who introduced her to the UT Tyler coaching staff.

The Patriots were invited to the 2014 and 2015 NCAA Division III Women's Soccer tournaments, losing to the Trinity University Tigers in the first round in 2014 and drawing 1–1 against Trinity in the first round of 2015 after extra time. Despite Mahomes scoring from the penalty spot in the ensuing penalty shoot-out, the Patriots lost the game 3–4.

On October 13, 2016, Mahomes became the first player in program history to score three hat-tricks in both a season and a career; she finished the season with four. As of 2023, Mahomes's 78 total points, 31 goals, and 111 shots on goal were each the second-most by a player in Texas-Tyler history, trailing only Strother in points. Her 40 points and 18 goals during her 2016 senior season were single-season program records, and her seven-point matches on September 17, 2016, and October 15, 2016, were single-match program records. She graduated from Texas-Tyler with a bachelor's degree in kinesiology.

In May 2017, Mahomes signed with Icelandic club Afturelding/Fram when it competed in third tier, 2. deild kvenna. Strother, her Whitehouse High and Texas-Tyler teammate, had already signed with another team in the league. Mahomes joined the team in July and scored two goals in five appearances over her only season, and Afturelding/Fram won the league and earned promotion to second tier, 1. deild kvenna. The club did not extend a new contract to Mahomes after the season.

== Entrepreneurship ==
Mahomes retired from soccer in 2017, moved to Kansas City where her now husband Patrick lived, and became a Certified Fitness Trainer. While in college, she interned with Bobby Stroupe, who later became Patrick’s longtime personal trainer. During the 2020 global COVID-19 pandemic, she regularly filled in for Stroupe, developing workouts for her boyfriend.

Mahomes also founded a workout brand, Brittany Lynne Fitness, an online service, that she promotes as an influencer.

On December 7, 2020, the National Women's Soccer League (NWSL) awarded an expansion team to an ownership group including Mahomes. The club, initially named Kansas City NWSL, took on the player contracts and draft picks of Utah Royals FC, effectively relocating the team. In October 2021, Mahomes announced the team's re-branding as the Kansas City Current and its plans to build a stadium for the team on the Berkley Riverfront Park of Kansas City, Missouri. She participated in its October 2022 groundbreaking ceremony.

In December 2025, Mahomes introduced a fan-oriented apparel line in collaboration with Amazon. The collection includes casual clothing and accessories designed for Kansas City Chiefs fans. The launch marked an additional commercial initiative associated with her public profile.

== Personal life ==
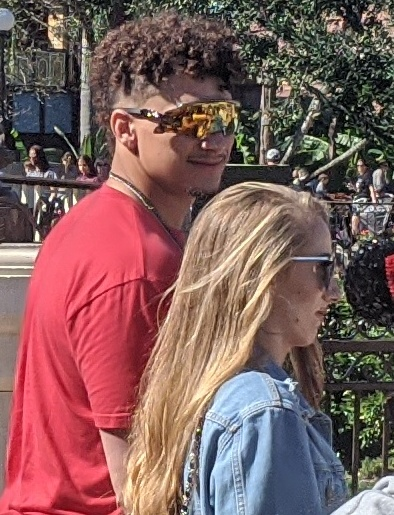
Mahomes with her future husband Patrick in 2020

Mahomes married NFL quarterback Patrick Mahomes, her high school sweetheart, at a wedding in Hawaii on March 12, 2022. They had been engaged since September 1, 2020. They have three children, two daughters and a son. Patrick later joined her as a minority-stake owner of the Kansas City Current.

In January 2026, Mahomes was inducted into the University of Texas at Tyler Hall of Fame.

== Honors ==
Afturelding/Fram

- 2. deild kvenna: 2017

== See also ==
- National Women's Soccer League owners
