= Whitehouse Independent School District =

School district in Texas

Whitehouse High School, 2005

The Whitehouse Independent School District is a school district in Whitehouse, Texas, United States. In addition to Whitehouse, the district also serves some of the southeast Tyler.

The school district received the highest accountability rating ('A') from the Texas Education Agency in 2022.

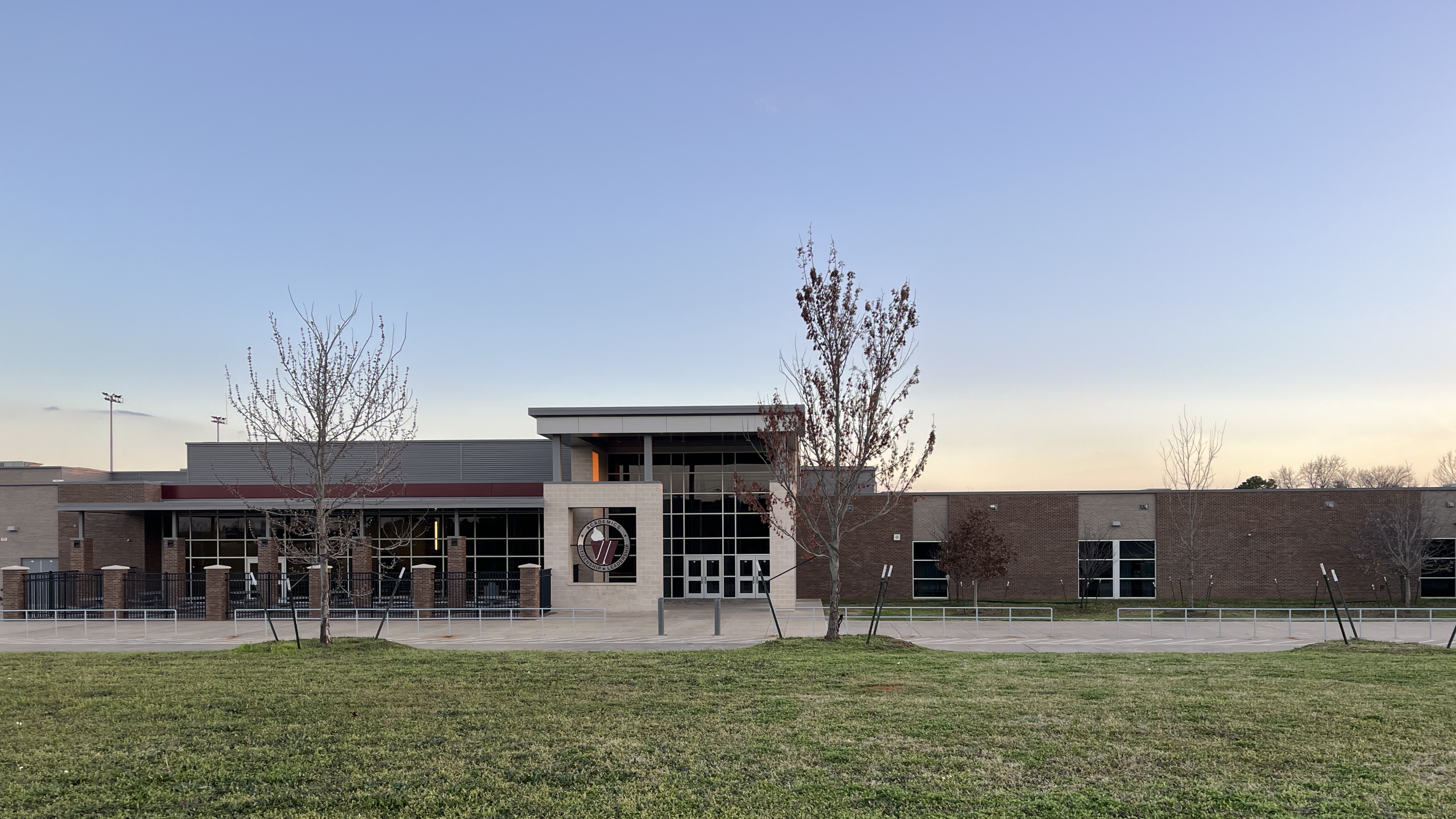
Whitehouse Junior High School, 2024

== School campuses ==
- Whitehouse High School (grades 9-12)
- Whitehouse Junior High (grades 7-8)
- J.W. Holloway Middle (grade 6)
- H.L. Higgins Elementary (grades preK-5)
- Mozelle Brown Elementary (grade preK-5)
- Stanton-Smith Elementary (grades preK-5)
- Gus Winston Cain Elementary (grades preK-5)

== Extracurricular programs ==
Some extracurricular programs include concert and marching band (from 6th grade), a choir program, a theater arts company, art classes, Spanish (from 7th grade), and athletics.

== Officials ==
The Whitehouse Independent School District is currently searching for a new superintendent following the departure of Dr. Christopher Moran in December 2023. The school board is responsible for overseeing the district and appointing a new superintendent. As of December 18, 2023, The Superintendent will assume the position on June 10, 2024.

The current school board members are:

- President: Dr. Todd Raabe
- Vice President: Mr. Al Flanagan
- Secretary: Ms. Holly Conaway

== Principals ==
- Whitehouse High School: William Ripley
- Whitehouse Junior High School: Kyle Holder
- Holloway Middle School: Cole Sartor
- Stanton-Smith Elementary School: Greg Dean
- Higgins Elementary School: Joanne Saul
- Brown Elementary School: Robbi McCarter
- Cain Elementary School: Laurie Blain
