= Nate Brooks (American football) =

American football player (born 1996)

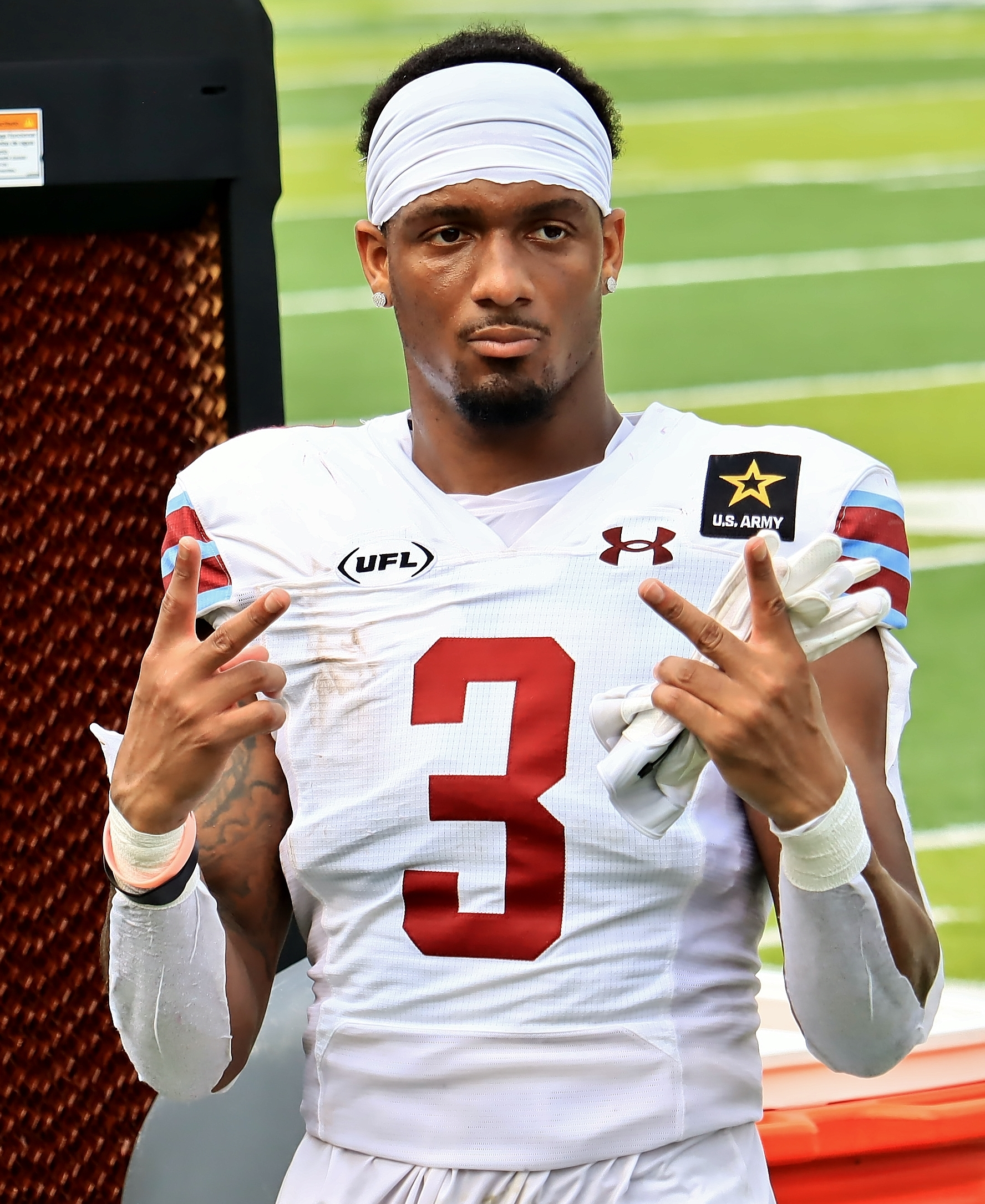
- Brooks with the Michigan Panthers in 2024

No. 26 – Orlando Storm
- Position: Cornerback
- Roster status: Active

Personal information
- Born: September 5, 1996 (age 30); Tyler, Texas, U.S.
- Listed height: 6 ft 0 in (1.83 m)
- Listed weight: 190 lb (86 kg)

Career information
- High school: Whitehouse (Whitehouse, Texas)
- College: North Texas (2015–2018)
- NFL draft: 2019: undrafted

Career history
- Arizona Cardinals (2019)*; New England Patriots (2019)*; Miami Dolphins (2019); Baltimore Ravens (2020); Tampa Bay Buccaneers (2021)*; Tennessee Titans (2021)*; Arizona Cardinals (2021–2022)*; Las Vegas Raiders (2022)*; Tennessee Titans (2022)*; Birmingham Stallions (2023); San Francisco 49ers (2023)*; Birmingham Stallions (2024)*; Michigan Panthers (2024); Cincinnati Bengals (2024)*; St. Louis Battlehawks (2026)*; Orlando Storm (2026–present)
- * Offseason or practice squad member only

Awards and highlights
- USFL champion (2023); All-UFL Team (2024)

Career NFL statistics as of 2024
- Tackles: 11
- Pass deflections: 2
- Stats at Pro Football Reference

Nate Brooks (born September 5, 1996) is an American professional football cornerback for the Orlando Storm of the United Football League (UFL). He played college football for the North Texas Mean Green and signed with the Arizona Cardinals as an undrafted free agent in 2019. He has also been a member of the New England Patriots, Miami Dolphins, Baltimore Ravens, Tampa Bay Buccaneers, Tennessee Titans, Las Vegas Raiders, San Francisco 49ers, and Birmingham Stallions.

== Early life ==
Brooks was born in Texas. He went on to play high school football in quarterback, cornerback and free safety positions with the Whitehouse Wildcats. His junior season performance including four pass interceptions and 53 tackles, earned Brooks first-team all-district 16-4A selection honors. Brooks also served the Wildcats as team captain. During his senior season, Brooks earned all-district 16-5A second-team honors. East Texas Sports News (ETSN) named Brooks to its 2014 East Texas Football Super Team Second-Team.

A two-sport athlete, Brooks also played outfield with the Wildcats baseball team.

Rated a three-star football recruiting prospect by 247Sports, Brooks received offers from Louisiana Tech and North Texas. He was considered to play cornerback for collegiate programs including Southern Methodist University (SMU) and Minnesota. Brooks was one of three East Texan recruits to join North Texas after accepting the offer made previously in June 2013. He graduated in 2015.

== College career ==
Committing to North Texas in June 2014, Brooks joined the field with the North Texas Mean Greens during the 2015 season. As a cornerback, Brooks played in all 10 games. His first game start was against Western Kentucky. After starting the last seven games of the season, Brooks tallied a career high of 11 tackles in the game against UTSA. By the end of the season, Brooks tallied 38 tackles.

During the 2016 season, Brooks made his start against SMU. He tallied 57 total tackles and earned a Defensive Player of the Week honor for his performance against Southern Miss. By the end of the season, Brooks earned an All-Conference USA Honorable Mention.

In 2017, Brooks was a preseason All-Conference USA selection. He started 8 games finishing with 31 tackles.

Despite his junior season performance, Brooks overcame injuries that plagued him. Having entered college football at 150 pounds (68 kg), he began his senior year in 2018 at a stronger, muscular, healthier 185 pounds (84 kg). He started in all 13 games, beginning against SMU. During his senior season, Brooks recorded 6 interceptions, 67 tackles and 10 pass break-ups. His senior season performance earned Brooks Second Team All-Conference USA selection honors. He was also a runner-up for the Jim Thorpe Award.

In 2019, Brooks graduated from North Texas with a bachelor's degree in Integrative Studies.

== Professional career ==
Pre-draft measurables
Height	Weight	Arm length	Hand span	Wingspan	40-yard dash	10-yard split	20-yard split	20-yard shuttle	Three-cone drill	Vertical jump	Broad jump	Bench press
5 ft 11 7/8 in (1.83 m)	187 lb (85 kg)	31 1/8 in (0.79 m)	8 1/2 in (0.22 m)	6 ft 2 1/4 in (1.89 m)	4.62 s	1.57 s	2.70 s	4.07 s	6.65 s	40.5 in (1.03 m)	10 ft 7 in (3.23 m)	11 reps
All values from Pro Day

=== Arizona Cardinals (first stint) ===
Following the conclusion of the 2019 NFL draft, Brooks signed with the Arizona Cardinals as an undrafted free agent in 2019.

=== New England Patriots ===
On September 10, 2019, Brooks was signed to the New England Patriots practice squad.

=== Miami Dolphins ===
On December 10, 2019, Brooks signed by the Miami Dolphins from the New England Patriots practice squad.

On September 5, 2020, Brooks was waived/injured during final roster cuts, and subsequently reverted to the team's injured reserve list the next day. He was waived with an injury settlement on September 11.

=== Baltimore Ravens ===
On November 10, 2020, Brooks was signed to the Baltimore Ravens' practice squad. He was elevated to the active roster on January 2, 2021, for the team's week 17 game against the Cincinnati Bengals, and reverted to the practice squad after the game. He was released on January 4.

=== Tampa Bay Buccaneers ===
On May 6, 2021, Brooks was signed by the Tampa Bay Buccaneers. He was waived on August 22, 2021.

=== Tennessee Titans (first stint) ===
On August 26, 2021, Brooks signed with the Tennessee Titans. He was waived on August 29, 2021. On November 1, 2021, Brooks was re-signed to the Titans practice squad. He was released on November 9, but later re-signed on December 15. He was released on December 27.

=== Arizona Cardinals (second stint) ===
On December 29, 2021, Brooks was signed to the Arizona Cardinals practice squad. He signed a reserve/future contract with the Cardinals on January 19, 2022. He was released on August 9, 2022.

=== Las Vegas Raiders ===
On August 12, 2022, Brooks was signed by the Las Vegas Raiders. He was waived on August 16, 2022.

=== Tennessee Titans (second stint) ===
On September 13, 2022, Brooks signed with the practice squad of the Tennessee Titans. He was released off the practice squad on October 18, 2022.

=== Birmingham Stallions (first stint) ===
Brooks signed with the Birmingham Stallions of the USFL on December 3, 2022. He was released from his contract on August 11, 2023, to sign with an NFL team.

=== San Francisco 49ers ===
On August 12, 2023, Brooks signed with the San Francisco 49ers. He was waived on August 27, 2023.

=== Birmingham Stallions (second stint) ===
Brooks re-signed with the Birmingham Stallions on September 20, 2023.

=== Michigan Panthers ===
On January 15, 2024, Brooks was selected by the Michigan Panthers with the fifth overall pick in the Super Draft portion of the 2024 UFL dispersal draft. He was named to the 2024 All-UFL team on June 5, 2024.

=== Cincinnati Bengals ===
On July 26, 2024, Brooks signed with the Cincinnati Bengals. He was waived on August 27, and re-signed to the practice squad the next day. Bryan signed a reserve/future contract on January 7, 2025. On August 25, Brooks was waived by the Bengals.

=== St. Louis Battlehawks ===
On January 14, 2026, Brooks was selected by the St. Louis Battlehawks of the United Football League (UFL). He was released on March 19.

=== Orlando Storm ===
On April 13, 2026, Brooks signed with the Orlando Storm of the United Football League (UFL).
