= Garbage time =

Time near the end of a decided sports match

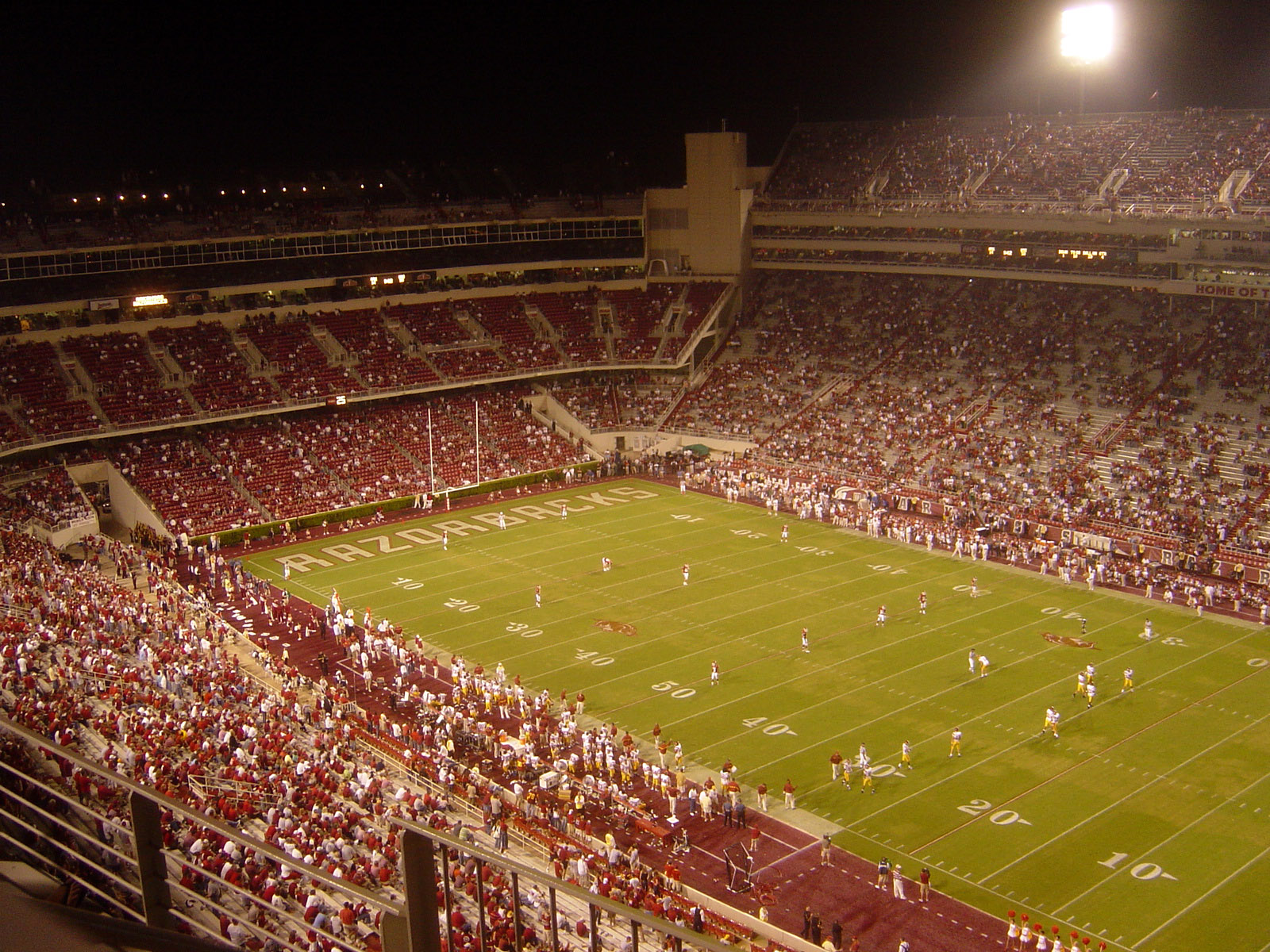
During the garbage time of an already settled American football game, the previously full stadium is now half-full and the substitutes are on the field.

In sports, garbage time is the period near the end of a timed sports competition that has become a blowout and the outcome has effectively been decided. Typically during garbage time, coaches of one or both teams replace their best players with substitutes. This gives playing experience to the substitutes, who are usually less experienced or younger players, and protects the best players from the possibility of injury.

== Name ==
Garbage time owes its name to the fact that this period in a game is frequently marked by a significant drop in the quality of play. This occurs for two primary reasons. First, the players involved during that time are generally less experienced. Second, because seldom-used substitutes usually desire more future playing time, such players are often more concerned with making a favorable impression than with executing team play at its best; this is especially true during garbage time because at that point, the matter of which team will win is decided.

== Usage ==
During garbage time, the trailing team can sometimes rack up an unusually high tally of statistics, leading the eventual box score to be misleading about its actual game performance. For instance, in American football, if the losing team is behind by several touchdowns, the offense may resort entirely to the passing game in a futile effort to catch up. At the same time, the leading team (on defense, with second or third string players) may allow them to complete plays (which benefits them by running out the clock). This may lead the statistics to indicate a high amount of passing yards for the losing squad, which might suggest the team performed better than in reality. For example, former Jacksonville Jaguars quarterback Blake Bortles had significantly better passing statistics in garbage time than during other points in the game.

In some cases, both teams will use second or third string players in garbage time, and in college play, if first-string players are draft-eligible juniors or seniors, the second and third-string players will play to gain an advantage towards becoming first-string the next season. Sometimes the game experience gained by backup players during garbage time can be crucial to their development, since it is otherwise difficult for them to get playing time (especially certain positions such as the backup quarterback), although this experience comes with the caveats that garbage time is not a high-pressure situation and that unusual strategies may be employed. Complementing this strategy, teams sit their first-string players during garbage time to give them more rest and avoid further injuries for future games. In baseball, teams losing by a blowout often use long reliever or even a position player as the pitcher; while the latter does save the bullpen for future games, that position player is more prone to injury pitching.

In general, although not always the case, it is not unusual in American football for the losing team to have more passing attempts/yards than the winning team, unless the winning team is also using a reserve quarterback. Often in the college game, a freshman quarterback will play during garbage time, after the upperclassman quarterback has put the game out of reach, gaining experience with second-string or third-string receivers and backs.

Particularly at the youth level, garbage time is eliminated by the use of a mercy rule, which automatically ends a game when the margin of victory has reached a point that is presumably insurmountable.

=== Rules ===
In some sports, there are "unwritten rules" for garbage time; for example, the leading team should not continue to play its starting players, devote unnecessary effort toward increasing the size of its lead, or attempt particularly difficult and spectacular plays. This is interpreted as an unsportsmanlike attempt to embarrass or humiliate the trailing team, and in some cases may also be seen as retaliation, either against the opponent or the critics of the team in general (see running up the score for a more detailed explanation of this type of behavior). However, sometimes a team may have legitimate motivation to run up the score, such as when margin of victory is a factor in rankings, as it was for many years in the Bowl Championship Series. Most (although not all) elite competitions now employ tiebreakers that deemphasize or even outright ignore the importance of statistics such as goal difference for which there would be an obvious incentive to "run up the score."

=== Sport-specific ===
The phrase garbage time is one of a number of commonly used basketball terms, each of which is thought to have either been coined by broadcaster Chick Hearn, or first given widespread exposure through Hearn's adoption of it for use during his broadcasts.

In full-contact fighting sports such as professional boxing, kickboxing and mixed martial arts, a competitor who believes to be down in points by a large amount can still win the contest by scoring a knockout. Meanwhile, sports like baseball, tennis and volleyball have untimed matches, so a comeback is always possible. Therefore, the concept of garbage time does not fully apply to these sports, as a comeback is always possible if unlikely.

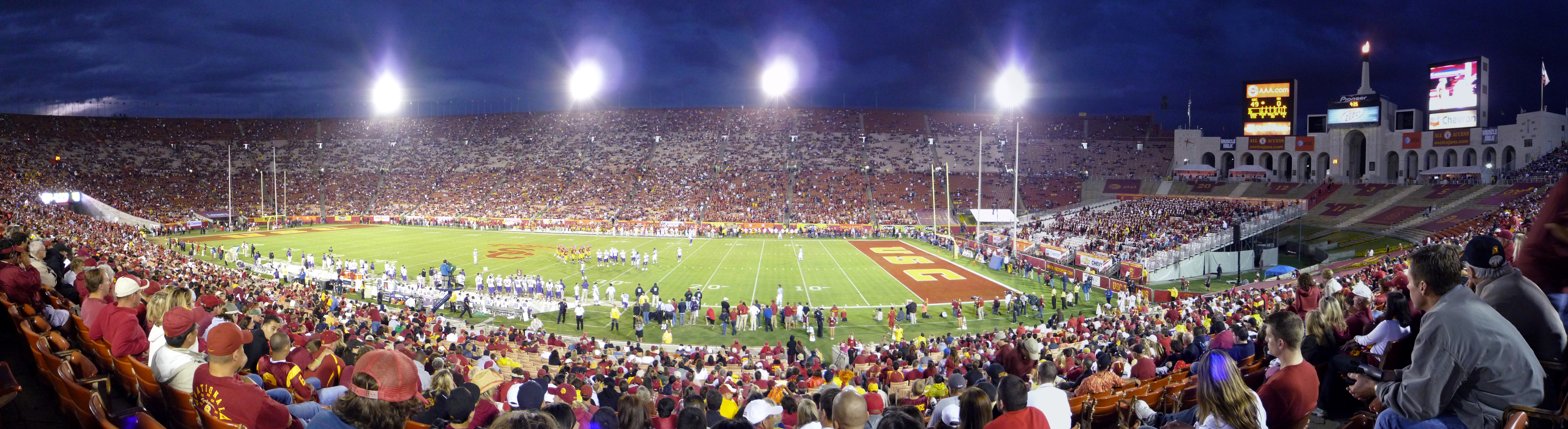
Garbage time in the fourth quarter of a decided game (the USC Trojans lead the Washington Huskies 49–0); as a result of the home team's assured victory, the announced crowd of over 80,000 has dissipated.

== In politics ==
After 2023, the phrase garbage time has been given a new meaning on the Chinese internet. It refers to a period when social development goes against natural rules, individuals are powerless to change, and the entire era is bound to fail. Garbage time, or the garbage time of history, first appeared on the Chinese language Internet in 2019, and caused widespread discussion among the Chinese public in mid-2023.

=== Usage ===
- Xu Jin, a columnist for the Financial Times' FT Chinese website, once wrote, "In the garbage time of history, managing failure may be a problem that most people need to face."
- An article published on the Sing Tao Daily pointed out that some Chinese financial experts have called on people "not to invest in garbage time," and some have used "garbage time" to advise people that "lying flat is the way out".
- After the attempted assassination of Donald Trump, Han Peng, a reporter from state media China Global Television Network, commented on Weibo, "It's garbage time for American-style democracy."

=== Opinions ===
The Beijing Daily criticized the "garbage time theory" as a pseudo-academic concept, arguing that hyping up this concept is a way of singing down China's development. An op-ed in Guancha accused users of the term of "attempting to create public expectations that the nation will inevitably fail."

Professor Yao-Yuan Yeh from the University of St. Thomas believes that the 'Garbage Time Theory', which posits that China's future is bound to fail, is more pessimistic than the 'Lying Flat Theory'.

== See also ==
- Resting the starters
- Elimination from postseason contention
- Untimed play
