= Resting the starters =

Sports strategy

Resting the starters is the substitution of regular players on a sports team with backup players, and it occurs when a team has clinched at least a playoff berth, often its division, and in many cases, home advantage, and no further regular season losses would hurt the team in the standings (or, inversely, if the team has been eliminated from playoff contention and has nothing further to gain by playing). This enables the team to avoid risking injury to the starters, and to give real life playing practice to backup players.

Veteran starters are also frequently rested in the final preseason games (or in some cases, the entire preseason schedule) in order to get them ready for the early part of the season and protect them from injury in non-competitive games.

Also, starters are sometimes rested during a game during garbage time when the outcome is mostly certain. While usually garbage time takes place toward the end of the fourth quarter of a game, in games where there is such a vast difference in talent and the winning team very quickly gains a large lead, the starters will be removed from the game early—sometimes well before the end of the first half—and the second- and lower-string players will play the remainder of the contest. As such, the starters play long enough only to gain a significant lead, giving the reserves extended playing time afterward.

== Effects on players, team and league ==
The debate on whether or not it is effective to rest starters has not been resolved. Some analysts argue that it is good for the team by enabling the bodies of the players to be fresh, while others state it could make them more “rusty.”

While resting starters may have the advantage of preventing injuries, it may deprive them of various statistics they are trying to accomplish, particularly season records. A number of "iron man" players also strive to start each game and will outright refuse to rest unless catastrophically injured and under medical orders not to play, in order to maintain their starting streak.

In sports with a small number of games per season, such as gridiron football, there is also the debate about whether it is better for a team with a perfect record up to that point to rest players or try for the perfect season. For example, the 2007 New England Patriots did not rest their starters and accomplished a perfect 16–0 regular season in a victory against the New York Giants (who also played their starters), but ultimately lost Super Bowl XLII to the same team. The 2009 Indianapolis Colts, after starting 14–0 and clinching home field advantage throughout the playoffs, rested their starters and lost the final two games. They made it to, but lost Super Bowl XLIV.

The 2011 Green Bay Packers rested their starting quarterback Aaron Rodgers on the final game of the regular season, as they had already secured the #1 seed in the NFC playoffs. Combined with the bye week earned with that seed, it would be a total of 3 weeks before Rodgers would play in a game again. The Packers lost their subsequent Divisional game vs. the New York Giants, leading commentators to wonder if the extra time off had been a detriment to Rodgers, as several crucial passes were dropped by the Packers in the game.

Resting the starters can be controversial if the game has playoff implications for the opponents. In such a scenario, the opposition could secure a playoff berth at the expense of another team. In extreme cases, teams have been accused of deliberately giving their opponents a better chance of winning where that week's opposition's presence in the playoffs is preferred to another team's, which could be considered "tanking" (a form of match fixing). A notable example of this was when the San Francisco 49ers, who had clinched a playoff berth, rested several starters and lost their regular-season finale in 1988 to the Los Angeles Rams, thereby keeping the New York Giants out of the postseason on tiebreakers (ostensibly as the Giants had defeated the 49ers in the playoffs in both 1985 and 1986, also injuring 49er quarterback Joe Montana in the latter year's game); after the 49ers-Rams game, Giants quarterback Phil Simms angrily accused the 49ers of "laying down like dogs."

In 1993, the National Football League experimented with a two-bye week format. After the success of expanding the regular season to a period of 17 weeks in the 1990 NFL season, the league hoped this new schedule would generate even more revenue. However, teams felt that having two weeks off during the regular season was too disruptive for their weekly routines, and thus it reverted to 17 weeks immediately after the season ended. The negative effects of having two bye weeks can be similar to the negative effects of resting starters, as having several weeks off (in the case of a division winner, several consecutive weeks off), a player's routine can be hurt. Another proposal for a two-bye-week season, part of a proposal to extend the season to 17 games over 19 weeks, was discussed in collective bargaining agreement negotiations prior to the 2021 season but ultimately not implemented.

The 2015 AFL season saw Fremantle and North Melbourne resting several key senior players in the final round of the season, in order to maximise their performance for the finals: Fremantle was assured of the minor premiership regardless of the outcome of the final rounds' matches, while similarly, North Melbourne was guaranteed to qualify for the finals regardless of the outcome of the final rounds' matches. North Melbourne made nine changes, while Fremantle made twelve team changes, equalling the all-time record associated with the St Kilda players' strike of 1911, then broke the record outright with thirteen changes bringing its players back for their qualifying final; this record stood until 2022. Both teams ended up qualifying for the preliminary finals. As a result of this mass resting of players, effective from the 2016 AFL season onwards, the AFL introduced a bye round between the final round of the AFL season and the first week of the finals, to encourage teams participating in the finals to field their strongest side possible ahead of their first final.

== National Basketball Association's issue with load management ==
The NBA has also taken action in order to make sure teams are not resting their starters at the cost of their fans losing interest as the regular season goes on, especially for high-profile nationally televised games where the league is counting on the starters to drive viewership. This is to protect the integrity and competitiveness of the league. In 2023, the Dallas Mavericks played against the Chicago Bulls in a key elimination game; after the game the Dallas Mavericks were fined $750,000 for restricting key players from playing in order to keep their 1st round pick. Fan involvement and their views on the games can impact attendance at games. If fans view games as less competitive, it can diminish their enjoyment of the game, which can affect fan attendance and TV viewership that the league relies on. Teams can be fined for resting players en masse, which is known euphemistically in basketball as "load management". For example, the league fined the Utah Jazz $500,000 and the Indiana Pacers $100,000 for resting healthy starters which violated the Player Participation Rules the NBA has in place.

As part of these efforts in the 2023–24 NBA season players began to be required to appear in at least 65 games to be eligible for many individual regular-season awards and honors. This rule has influenced players' supermax contract eligibility which means missing games can lead to players losing a lot of money. To receive credit for a game for purposes of award eligibility, a player must have been credited with at least 20 minutes played. However, two "near misses", in which the player appeared for 15 to 19 minutes, can be included in the 65-game count. The average number of minutes played by an NBA player during the season may influence their end of season performance. However, there are some cases where DNP a player can improve postseason results. Protections also exist for players who suffer season-ending injuries, who are eligible with 62 credited games, and those affected by what the CBA calls "bad faith circumstances". This eligibility requirement is currently required for a player to win the NBA MVP, Defensive Player of the Year, Most Improved Player awards, or to be selected to an All-NBA Team, though it is currently not a requirement for a player to win NBA Rookie of the Year, or Sixth Man of the Year, or to be selected to an NBA All-Rookie Team, since a rookie or a sixth man may not always be playing in 15 minutes a game.

=== Players and teams that have been fined for load management issues from 2023–2026 ===
2026

- NBA fines Utah Jazz and Pacers for poor management of their Rosters.

2025

- NBA fines Cleveland Cavaliers for violating Player Participation Policy
- NBA fines 76ers for violating league injury reporting rules.
- NBA fines Cavaliers again for Violating Player Participation Policy.
- NBA fines Utah Jazz for Violating Player Participation Policy.

2024

- NBA fines Atlanta Hawks for Violating Player Participation Policy.
- NBA Fines Clippers for Violating Player Participation Policy.
- Knicks Fined for Violating league injury reporting rules.
- 76ers fined for Violating League injury reporting rules.
- Pelicans and 76ers fined for Violating League Injury Reporting Rules.

2023

- Mavericks fined $750,000 for conduct detrimental to the league in an elimination game against the Chicago Bulls.
- Miami Heat fined for violating League Injury reporting rules.

== See also ==
- Squad rotation system
- DNP-CD, Did not play - Coach's decision, a designation used in basketball
