= Whitehouse High School =

Location
- 901 East Main Street; Whitehouse, Texas 75791-3130; United States; 32°13′57″N 95°12′50″W

Information
- School type: Public high school
- Motto: Students First
- Established: 1904
- School district: Whitehouse Independent School District
- Principal: Randal Speights
- Teaching staff: 103.45 (FTE)
- Grades: 9–12
- Enrollment: 1,475 (2023-2024)
- Student to teacher ratio: 14.26
- Colors: Maroon & White
- Athletics conference: UIL Class AAAAA (5A)
- Mascot: Wildcats
- Yearbook: The Wildcat
- Website: Whitehouse High School website

Whitehouse High School is a public high school in Whitehouse, Texas, United States. It is classified as a 5A school by the University Interscholastic League (UIL) and is part of the Whitehouse Independent School District in Smith County. In 2018, the school was rated "Met Standard" by the Texas Education Agency.

== History ==
Whitehouse High School was built in 2000, the high school at the time became the Junior High.

== Athletics ==
The Whitehouse Wildcats compete in the following sports:

- Baseball
- Basketball
- Cross country
- Drill Team
- Football
- Cheerleaders
- Golf
- Swimming
- Soccer
- Softball
- Tennis
- Track and field
- Powerlifting
- Wrestling
- Volleyball

=== State titles ===
The Wildcat boys' basketball team won 1977-78 2A basketball state title.

Tennis State Champions: 1980 - Kelly Kniffen (3A Singles) 1982 - Dave & Chris Tibbetts (3A Doubles) 1983 - Chris Tibbetts & Mark Hagen (3A Doubles) 1984 - Dave Tibbetts (3A Singles) 1985 - Chris Tibbetts (3A Singles)

== Band ==
The military style band's accomplishments include:

- U.I.L. Reigon Marching Competition first division for 33 Consecutive Years
  - 1989–present
- U.I.L Concert and Sighting Reading 26 years sweepstakes
  - 1989–present

== Notable alumni ==
- Nate Brooks, NFL cornerback
- Dylan Cantrell, tight end for the Washington Commanders
- Jacob Holmen, former professional basketball player
- Brittany Mahomes, former professional soccer player and owner of the Kansas City Current
- Patrick Mahomes, quarterback for the Kansas City Chiefs
- Jermod McCoy, college football cornerback
- Nathaniel Moran, American politician
- Josh Tomlin, pitcher for the Atlanta Braves
