= Whitehouse, Texas =

- City
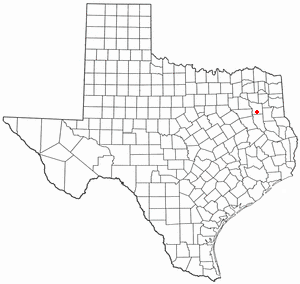
- Location of Whitehouse, Texas

- Coordinates: 32°13′24″N 95°14′16″W
- Country: United States
- State: Texas
- County: Smith

Area
  - Total: 5.56 sq mi (14.39 km^{2})
  - Land: 5.49 sq mi (14.23 km^{2})
  - Water: 0.062 sq mi (0.16 km^{2})
- Elevation: 449 ft (137 m)

Population (2020)
  - Total: 8,257
  - Density: 1,503/sq mi (580.3/km^{2})
- Time zone: UTC-6 (Central (CST))
  - Summer (DST): UTC-5 (CDT)
- ZIP code: 75791
- Area codes: 430, 903
- FIPS code: 48-78388
- GNIS feature ID: 2412258
- Airport: Tyler Pounds Regional Airport, Nuttall Airport
- Website: www.whitehousetx.org

Whitehouse is a city in Smith County, Texas, United States. Situated just southeast of Tyler, Texas, it has experienced steady growth, reaching a population of 8,257 in the 2020. As part of the Tyler metropolitan area, Whitehouse benefits from its proximity to the economic and cultural opportunities of the region while maintaining its own strong civic identity. The city is home to the Whitehouse Independent School District, known for its high academic standards, and features a mix of residential neighborhoods, parks, and businesses. With its strategic location along major transportation routes, Whitehouse continues to attract residents and businesses.

== History ==
=== Early history ===
The Welcome to Whitehouse sign is built from rock used in the old "rock school house." The school house and other public works were built during the Great Depression by the Works Progress Administration (WPA). The sign itself was made and donated by local resident Lynn Canfield.

The community was founded long before the city was officially incorporated by James Calhoun Hill (auctioneer in 1846 for Tyler land grants). The community was named in 1845, but was not incorporated until 1953. The school district (WISD) preceded incorporated municipal government and was largely responsible for the eventual formation of the city.

Residents of Whitehouse were predominantly farmers or worked in support of agriculture until transportation innovations following World War II led to other employment options. Many streets and subdivisions in the community are named for these early agricultural and commercial leaders.

According to oral tradition, the community was named "Whitehouse" by the railroad engineers who stopped near a white-washed community building during early settlement times. Several cherished historic resources include the various Works Progress Administration (WPA) projects located within the city. These projects, typically built with sandstone rockwork, are found throughout the city's historic Town Center.

=== YesterYear Celebration ===
Civic leaders established the YesterYear Celebration to educate residents about the community's history and heritage. The festival is held on the fourth weekend each June and includes activities such as parades, carnivals, historic battle reenactments, pageants, and trade days.

== Geography ==
The city is bisected by State Highway 110 and Farm to Market Road 346. The city of Tyler is located approximately seven miles (11 km) to the north, while the city of Troup lies roughly the same distance to the south.

According to the United States Census Bureau, the city has a total area that exceeds 3.8 square miles (9.8 km^{2}), all land. The city's extra territorial jurisdiction includes land surrounding Lake Tyler, a large water body used for drinking water and recreation by East Texas residents.

=== Climate ===
The climate in this area is characterized by hot, humid summers and generally mild to cool winters. According to the Köppen Climate Classification system, Whitehouse has a humid subtropical climate, abbreviated "Cfa" on climate maps.

== Demographics ==
Historical population
Census	Pop.	Note	%±
1960	842		—
1970	1,245		47.9%
1980	2,172		74.5%
1990	4,032		85.6%
2000	5,346		32.6%
2010	7,660		43.3%
2020	8,257		7.8%
U.S. Decennial Census

=== 2020 census ===
As of the 2020 census, there were 8,257 people, 2,844 households, and 2,352 families residing in the city. The median age was 34.3 years, 30.3% of residents were under the age of 18, and 13.5% of residents were 65 years of age or older. For every 100 females there were 88.5 males, and for every 100 females age 18 and over there were 82.4 males.

95.3% of residents lived in urban areas, while 4.7% lived in rural areas.

There were 2,844 households in Whitehouse, of which 46.9% had children under the age of 18 living in them. Of all households, 57.0% were married-couple households, 10.8% were households with a male householder and no spouse or partner present, and 27.4% were households with a female householder and no spouse or partner present. About 17.5% of all households were made up of individuals and 9.1% had someone living alone who was 65 years of age or older.

There were 2,979 housing units, of which 4.5% were vacant. The homeowner vacancy rate was 1.2% and the rental vacancy rate was 6.6%.

Racial composition as of the 2020 census
Race	Number	Percent
White	6,544	79.3%
Black or African American	645	7.8%
American Indian and Alaska Native	32	0.4%
Asian	171	2.1%
Native Hawaiian and Other Pacific Islander	3	0.0%
Some other race	211	2.6%
Two or more races	651	7.9%
Hispanic or Latino (of any race)	789	9.6%

=== 2000 census ===
As of the census of 2000, there were 5,346 people, 1,819 households, and 1,500 families residing in the city. The population density was 1,413.6 inhabitants per square mile (545.8/km^{2}). There were 1,890 housing units at an average density of 499.8 per square mile (193.0/km^{2}). The racial makeup of the city was 93.14% White, 2.47% African American, 0.64% Native American, 0.86% Asian, 1.78% from other races, and 1.12% from two or more races. Hispanic or Latino of any race were 3.98% of the population.

There were 1,819 households, out of which 50.4% had children under the age of 18 living with them, 66.2% were married couples living together, 13.5% had a female householder with no husband present, and 17.5% were non-families. 14.7% of all households were made up of individuals, and 5.3% had someone living alone who was 65 years of age or older. The average household size was 2.88 and the average family size was 3.20.

In the city, the population was spread out, with 32.4% under the age of 18, 7.1% from 18 to 24, 33.1% from 25 to 44, 18.8% from 45 to 64, and 8.5% who were 65 years of age or older. The median age was 32 years. For every 100 females, there were 91.9 males. For every 100 females age 18 and over, there were 84.6 males.

The median income for a household in the city was $46,804, and the median income for a family was $49,393. Males had a median income of $36,891 versus $22,334 for females. The per capita income for the city was $17,489. About 6.7% of families and 8.6% of the population were below the poverty line, including 13.5% of those under age 18 and 5.7% of those age 65 or over.

== Planning and development ==
=== Past efforts ===
The front and back cover of the Whitehouse Vision 2020 Comprehensive Plan. The document was adopted by the City of Whitehouse in the spring of 2006.

Whitehouse is in the first phase of an overhaul of its planning regulations. The city initially began regulating land use through zoning on December 4, 1987. The next major effort intended to improve quality of life in the city through planning was the completion of the community's first comprehensive plan in April 1996. The document was developed by J.T. Dunkin & Associates.

=== Recent efforts ===
The city's Planning & Zoning Commission has worked at the direction of the City Council to update various components of the 1987 zoning ordinance. The commission also recommended updates to the subdivision regulations which were adopted in February 2004. The city also contracted with Butler Planning Services to update the comprehensive plan from 1996. The firm, along with a citizen steering committee, produced the Whitehouse Vision 2020 Comprehensive Plan in the spring of 2006. Following this effort, the city is currently evaluating the need for a new zoning ordinance which can implement the recommendations of the Vision 2020 Plan.

== Education ==
Whitehouse High School, Whitehouse Texas. (2005)

The city is served by the Whitehouse Independent School District. The district consists of seven schools located on six campuses. The campuses include:

- Cain Elementary School
- Mozelle Brown Elementary School
- Higgins Elementary School
- Stanton-Smith Elementary School
- Holloway Middle School
- Whitehouse Junior High School
- Whitehouse High School
- AIM Center

The district is well regarded throughout the East Texas region and is one factor contributing to the city's strong growth rate.

Stanton-Smith Elementary school is a more recent addition to the Whitehouse ISD campuses. It has been added to meet the needs of population growth within the city, with more efficient classroom space.

== Notable people ==
- Nate Brooks (born 1996), American football player
- Dylan Cantrell (born 1994), American football player
- Patrick Mahomes (born 1995), American football player
- Nathaniel Moran (born 1974), U.S. representative for Texas
