= Malone =

Malone (Irish: Ó Maoileoin) is an Irish surname. From the Irish "Mael Eóin", the name literally translates as "bald John", which is believed to refer to being a servant or a disciple of Saint John. Woulfe (1923) explicitly gives Ó Maoileóin (anglicized Malone) as “descendant of Maoleóin,” glossing Maoleóin as “servant of St. John,” and he calls the Ó Maoileóin a distinguished ecclesiastical family at Clonmacnoise with multiple abbots and bishops.

== People ==
- Gilla Críst Ua Máel Eóin (died 1127), historian and Abbot of Clonmacnoise, Ó Maoil Eoin
- Adrian Malone (1937–2015), British documentary filmmaker
- Alfred Malone (born 1982), American football defensive tackle
- Ambrosia Malone (born 1998), Australian field hockey player
- Amy Malone, American politician
- Angela Malone (born 1971), author
- Angie Malone (born 1965), British Paralympian and World Champion Wheelchair curler
- Anna Marie Malone (born 1960), Canadian long-distance runner
- Annie Malone (1877–1957), American businesswoman, inventor, and philanthropist
- Anthony Malone (1700–1776), Irish lawyer and politician
- Arnold Malone (born 1937), Canadian public servant
- Art Malone (1936–2013), American race car driver
- Bennett Malone (1944–2017), American politician
- Benny Malone (1952–2020), American football running back
- Bernie Malone (born 1948), Irish Labour Party politician
- Beth Malone (born 1969), American actress and singer
- Beverly Malone (born 1948), nursing executive
- Bill C. Malone (born 1934), American musician, author, and historian
- Blake Malone (born 2001), American soccer player
- Bob Malone (born 1965), American keyboardist, singer, and songwriter
- Bönz Malone, American writer and actor
- Brad Malone (born 1989), Canadian ice hockey forward
- Brendan Malone (1942–2023), American basketball coach
- Brent Malone (1941–2004), photorealist painter and gallery owner
- Brian Malone (born 1985), footballer
- Bugzy Malone (born 1990), English grime rapper
- Carole Malone (born 1954), British journalist
- Caroline Malone (born 1957)
- Casey Malone (born 1977), American discus thrower
- Catherine L. Malone, American biologist and an author
- Cecil L'Estrange Malone (1890–1965), British MP and journalist
- Cha Cha Malone (born 1987), singer, music producer, songwriter, composer, and member of b-boy crew Art of Movement
- Chantel Malone (born 1991), athlete in long jump and sprinting
- Charles R. Malone (born 1950s), Chief Justice of the Supreme Court of Alabama
- Charley Malone (1910–1992), American football end
- Chelsea Malone (born 1992), American beauty pageant titleholder
- Chris Malone (born 1978), Australian rugby union coach and player
- Christopher Malone (born 1990), Scottish footballer
- Chuck Malone (born 1965), baseball relief pitcher
- Cliff Malone (1925–2008), Canadian ice hockey forward
- Colleen Malone, New Zealand sprinter
- Dan Malone (born 1955), American journalist
- Dana Malone (1857–1917), American politician
- Darrell Malone (born 1967), American football cornerback
- David Malone (disambiguation), several people
- David M. Malone (born 1954), Canadian author
- DeAngelo Malone (born 1999), American football player
- Denis Malone, Caribbean jurist
- Derek Malone, paralympic athlete
- Dermot Malone (fl. 2010s), Irish Gaelic footballer
- Dick Malone (born 1947), Scottish former footballer
- Dion Malone (born 1989), Suriname-born Dutch footballer
- Don Malone, Australian rugby league footballer
- Donald Malone (born 1985)
- Dorothy Malone (1924–2018), American actress
- Doug Malone (disambiguation), several people
- Dudley Field Malone (1882–1950), lawyer and activist
- Dumas Malone (1892–1986), American historian, biographer, and editor
- Ed Malone (disambiguation), several people
- Eddie Malone (born 1985), Scottish association football player
- Edmond Malone (1741–1812), Irish Shakespearean scholar and editor
- Edna Malone (1899–?), Canadian dancer
- Edward Cyril Malone (born 1937), Saskatchewan lawyer, politician, and judge
- Edward Malone (disambiguation), several people
- Eileen Malone (1906–1999), American harpist and music educator
- Emmet Malone, Football correspondent
- Fergy Malone (1844–1905), Irish baseball player & manager
- Foster Malone (1887–1926), Canadian ice hockeyer
- Frank Malone (disambiguation), several people
- Gareth Malone (born 1975), English musician, choirmaster, and documentary maker
- George W. Malone (1890–1961), Nevada Senator
- Gerry Malone (born 1950), politician
- Glasses Malone (born 1979), American rapper
- Gordon Malone (born 1974), basketball player
- Greg Malone (disambiguation), several people
- Grover Malone (1895–1950), footballer
- Gus Malone (born 1960), Scottish footballer
- Hugh Malone (1938–2001), American surveyor and politician
- Ian Malone (1974–2003), member of the British Army's Irish Guards
- J. B. Malone (1914–1989), Irish writer and broadcaster
- J.D. Malone (born 1965), singer and songwriter
- J.J. Malone (1935–2004), guitarist, singer, and keyboardist
- J. R. Malone (1858–1935), American baseball umpire
- Jak Malone (born 1994), English stage actor
- Jack J. Malone (1919–2001), Australian rules footballer
- James E. Malone Jr. (1957–2024), Maryland state legislator
- James F. Malone (1904–1976), district attorney for Allegheny County, Pennsylvania
- James L. Malone (American football) (1908–1979), first head football coach for the University of Louisiana at Monroe Warhawks
- James L. Malone (diplomat) (1931–1996), Asst. Secretary of State in the Reagan Administration
- James Malone (Australian politician) (1878–1952), New South Wales politician
- James William Malone (1920–2000), American Roman Catholic bishop
- Jeff Malone (born 1961), American basketball player
- Jena Malone (born 1984), American actress
- Jill Malone (writing 2008-2013), American novelist
- Jo Malone (born 1963), British perfumer
- Joe Malone ("Phantom Joe", 1890–1969), Canadian ice hockey player
- John C. Malone (born 1941), chairman of the Liberty Media Corporation
- John Joseph Malone (1894–1917), Canadian naval aviator
- Joseph Malone (VC) (1833–1883), British soldier
- Joseph R. Malone (born 1949), New Jersey state legislator
- Josh Malone (born 1996), American football player
- Karl Malone (born 1963), American basketball player
- Kelvin Malone (1961–1999), American spree killer
- Kemp Malone (1889-1971), American medievalist, philologist and etymologist
- Kyp Malone (born 1973), American rock musician
- Lew Malone (1897–1972), American baseball player
- Manie Malone (born 1981), Ivorian actress
- Mark Malone (born 1958), American former football player and television commentator
- Martin M. Malone (1888–1962), American businessman and politician
- Mary Malone (actress), British actress
- Maud Malone (1873–1951), American librarian and suffragette
- Maurice Malone (born 2000), German footballer
- Michael Malone (disambiguation), several people
- Michelle Malone, American guitarist and singer-songwriter
- Molly Malone (actress) (1888–1952), American silent-film actress
- Moses Malone (1955–2015), American basketball player
- Ora Lee Malone (1918–2012), American labor and civil rights activist
- Pat Malone (wrestler) 1900–1988), American professional wrestler
- Percy Malone (born 1942), Arkansas state legislator
- Peter Malone (mayor) (1928–2006), former mayor of Nelson, New York
- Post Malone (born 1995), American rapper, singer, songwriter, and record producer
- Richard Malone, of Baronston, Esq. (1738 – 14 April 1816), 1st Baron Sunderlin, created in 1785
- Richard J. Malone (born 1946), American Roman Catholic bishop
- Robert Malone (American football) (born 1988), American football punter
- Robert W. Malone (born 1959 or 1960), American virologist, immunologist and molecular biologist
- Roberto Malone (born 1956), Italian porn actor
- Ryan Malone (born 1979), American ice hockey player on the Tampa Bay Lightning
- Ryan Malone (soccer) (born 1992), American soccer player
- Sam Malone (politician), (born 1970), Cincinnati city council member tried for domestic violence
- Scott Malone (born 1991), English footballer
- Sean Malone (1970–2020), American musician and professor
- Slauson Malone (born 1995), American musician
- Tegan Malone, American politician
- Terry Malone, American football coach
- Thomas H. Malone (1834–1906), Confederate veteran, judge and Dean of the Vanderbilt University Law School
- Tina Malone (born 1963), English actress from Shameless
- Tywone Malone Jr. (born 2003), American football defensive tackle
- William Malone (director) (born 1953), American filmmaker
- Lieutenant Colonel William George Malone (1859–1915), World War I New Zealand soldier
- William M. Malone (1900–1981), Californian politician

== Characters ==
- Bugsy Malone, a 1976 character in a popular film of the same name
- Cotton Malone, a character of Steve Berry's books
- Detective Malone, alias of Martin Lawrence's character in the film Blue Streak (1999)
- Ed Malone, narrator of the book The Lost World
- Harry Malone (disambiguation), several characters
- Special Agent Jack Malone (Without a Trace), portrayed by Anthony LaPaglia in the television program Without a Trace
- Jasmine Malone, a character in The Bold and the Beautiful, portrayed by Lark Voorhies (1995–1996)
- Jason Malone, player character in the mobile game Gangstar Vegas
- Jim Malone, Sean Connery's character in the film The Untouchables (1987)
- Kevin Malone, accountant at Dunder Mifflin on the TV Show The Office
- Maggie Malone Seaver, a working (news reporter) mom in the television series Growing Pains (1985–1992), played by Joanna Kerns
- Dr Mary Malone, a character in Phillip Pullman's His Dark Materials Trilogy
- Nomi Malone, lead character in the film Showgirls (1995) portrayed by Elizabeth Berkley
- Matches Malone, criminal alias of the Batman
- Richard Malone, former CIA agent, and the main character in the 1987 film Malone, played by Burt Reynolds
- Rita Malone, a character in Flushed Away, voiced by Kate Winslet
- Rubi Malone, heroine of the video game WET
- Scobie Malone, character in 20 novels by Jon Cleary, and the film based on one, Scobie Malone (1975)
- Sam Malone, a character on the sitcom Cheers
- Stella Malone, a character in Jonas, played by Chelsea Kane
- Valerie Malone, a character in Beverly Hills 90210, portrayed by Tiffany Amber Thiessen (1994–98)
- Malone, the eponymous narrator of Samuel Beckett's Malone Dies (1951).
