= Green Machine =

Green Machine may refer to:

- Greenmachine, a Japanese stoner / doom metal band
- "Green Machine" (song), a song by Kyuss on their album Blues for the Red Sun
- Canberra Raiders, an Australian National Rugby League team
- Danny Green (born 1973), Australian boxer
- Green Machine, a wrestling gimmick used by Pat Malone (1900–1988).
- Ireland (Australian rules football National Team)
- OLPC XO, a laptop computer
- Michael van Gerwen, a Dutch darts player
- Toronto-Dominion Bank's brand for automated banking machines
- The Cavaliers Drum and Bugle Corps
- "Green Machine", a song by The Apples in Stereo on their album Fun Trick Noisemaker
- The prototype for Hewlett-Packard 9100A, created by Thomas E. Osborne
- Green Machine, a model of tricycle manufactured by Huffy
