= Harry Malone =

Harry Malone may refer to:

- Harry Malone, character in Harriers
- Harry Malone, character in 40 Guns to Apache Pass
- Harry Malone, character in CI5: The New Professionals

== See also ==
- Malone
