= 1989 Australia Day Honours =

The 1989 Australia Day Honours are appointments to various orders and honours to recognise and reward good works by Australian citizens. The list was announced on 26 January 1989 by the Governor General of Australia, Sir Ninian Stephen.

The Australia Day Honours are the first of the two major annual honours lists, the first announced to coincide with Australia Day (26 January), with the other being the Queen's Birthday Honours, which are announced on the second Monday in June.

† indicates an award given posthumously.

== Order of Australia ==
=== Companion (AC) ===
==== General Division ====
Recipient	Citation	Notes
His Excellency the Honourable Sir Walter Benjamin Campbell	For service to the Crown and the people of Queensland	
The Honourable Sir Llewellyn Roy Edwards	For service to the community, particularly as Chairman of World Expo ‘88	
Emeritus Professor Frank John Fenner, CMG MBE	For service to medical science, to public health and to the environment	
Gerald Gleeson	For public service as Secretary of the Premier's Department, New South Wales	
The Honourable Justice Robert Marsden Hope, CMG QC	For service to the law, to government, to learning and conservation	
Sister Deirdre Frances Jordan, MBE	For service to learning and to the community, particularly the Aboriginal community	
Brian Thorley Loton	For service to industry	
Sir John Brian Massy-Greene	For service to banking, to industry and to the community	
John Walter Utz, AO	For service to business and to industry	
Alan John Woods, AO	For public service, particularly as Secretary to the Department of Defence	
The Honourable Sir John (McIntosh) Young, KCMG	For service to the law and to the Crown	

=== Officers (AO) ===
==== General Division ====
Recipient	Citation	Notes
Emeritus Professor Adrien Albert	For services to medical chemistry, particularly in the fields of teaching and research	
Anthony Stuart Blunn	For service to the Public Service	
The Hon Malcolm John Bryce	For service to the Western Australian Parliament	
Professor Graham Dene Burrows	For service to medicine, particularly in the field of psychiatry	
John Leonard Connell	For service to medicine, particularly in the field of vascular surgery	
Kay Cottee	For service to the sport of sailing, the community and to youth	
The Right Reverend George Michael Crennan, OBE	For service to the community, particularly in the field of migrant welfare	
Sheila Drummond	For service to people with disabilities, particularly as a speech pathologist	
Kathleen Elizabeth Fitzpatrick	For service to education, particularly in the field of history	
Professor Gwendoline Fay Gale	For service to social science, particularly in the fields of geography and Aboriginal studies	
Peter Gregory Goldston	For service to World Expo 88 in the fields of design planning and construction	
David Samuel Greatorex	For service to business and commerce, particularly in the field of insurance	
John Neville Holland, LVO	For service to the Australian honours system and for public service	
Professor Bruce William Holloway	For service to science, particularly in the field of biotechnology	
Dr Thomas Henry Hurley, OBE	For service to medicine	
Emeritus Professor the Honourable Joseph Ezra Isaac	For service to industrial relations and to education	
Donald Hope Laidlaw	For service to secondary industry, the South Australian Parliament and to the community	
Ian Murray McLachlan	For service to primary industry	
Alex Leo Morokof	For service to secondary industry and as Chairman of the Parliament House Construction Authority	
The Honourable Milton Arthur Morris	For service to the New South Wales Parliament, and to the community, particularly youth	
Leslie Allan Murray	For service to Australian literature	
Gerald Mansfield Niall	For service to business, to industry and to the community	
Gordon Robert Peatey	For public service as Chief Executive of the Parliament House Construction Authority	
Professor John Riddoch Poynter	For service to education	
Jeanne Pratt	For service to the community	
Bernard Francis Prindiville, CMG	For service to the community	
Jonathan William Sanders, OBE	For service to sailing and to marine science	
Thomas William Shapcott	For service to Australian literature and to arts administration	
Dr Annette Lester (Anne) Silcock	For service to education, particularly early childhood education	
Michael Sinclair	For service to the arts, particularly to fine arts, music and literature	
Harry William Sorensen, MBE	For service to the finance industry	
John Richard Steinle	For service to education	
The Honourable Kevin James Stewart	For service to the New South Wales Parliament and as a New South Wales Agent-General in London	
Emeritus Professor David Hugh Trollope	For service to engineering, particularly in the field of geomechanics	
Professor Peter Louis Waller	For service to the legal profession, particularly as a teacher, and to the community	
Robert Bruce Winder	For service to education	
Professor Ann Janet Woolcock	For service to medicine, particularly in the field of respiratory medicine	
David Wynn	For service to primary industry, particularly oenology and to the arts	

==== Military Division ====
Branch	Recipient	Citation	Notes
Navy	Commodore Adrian Ronald Cummins	For service to the Royal Australian Navy, particularly as the Director-General of Naval Warfare	
Australian Army	Major General Murray Phillip Blake, AM MC	For service to the Australian Army as Commandant Royal Military College	
Australian Army	Major General Peter Raymond Phillips, MC	For service to the Australian Army as Assistant Chief of the General Staff Personnel	
Air Force	Air Vice-Marshal Michael Douglas Miller	For service to the Royal Australian Air Force as Director General of Air Force Health Services	

=== Member (AM) ===
==== General Division ====
Recipient	Citation	Notes
Aziza Hanem Abdel-Halim	For services to the Muslim Community, particularly to women	
Barbara Joan Absolom	For service to World Expo '88, particularly as Deputy Entertainment Director	
Dr Yvonne Aitken	For service to agricultural research	
David Andrew	For service to industrial relations in the building and construction sector and to the community	
John Desmond Bailey	For service to the community and athletics	
Dr Laszlo Benyei	For service to the resettlement of migrants in Australia	
Cedric Ross Berglund	For service to the community and business and industry	
Effie Wyllie Best	For service to the community and education	
Joan Margaret Bielski	For service to the development of equal opportunities for women and girls, particularly in education	
Nancy Black	For service to the community, particularly through organisations for women and children	
Dr Josiah Mark Bonnin	For service to the community and medicine	
William Ashley Bradfield	For service to astronomy	
Joyce Patricia Bragg	For service to the community, particularly through organisations for women and children	
James Thomas Carlin Brassil	For service to industrial relations and to occupational health and safety	
Robert John Briskey	For service to the Australian Postal and Telecommunications Union	
Austin Brookes	For service to mountaineering as Leader of the Australian Bicentennial Everest Expedition	
Eric Canfield Brown	For service to engineering	
Jane Anne Brumfield	For service to World Expo '88, particularly as Communications Director	
Jeanette Mary Landell Buckham	For service to education	
Assistant Commissioner Aubrey Patrick Canning, QPM	For service to public service	
Trevor Allen Chaseling	For service to aviation security	
James Arthur Clough	For service to the NSW Parliament and to the community	
Dr Helen Margaret Connell	For service to medicine in the field of child psychiatry	
Jean Louise Conybeare	For service to people with intellectual disabilities	
Kenneth Fabian Cox	For service to the thoroughbred horse industry	
Rewa Mitchell Craig	For service to business and industry	
James Stewart Cuming	For service to accountancy and the community	
Garry Jeffery Daly	For service to the community and sports administration	
Noel Irvine Dawkins	For service to the community and local government	
Keith Dawson	For service to the trustee industry and the community	
Anne Pamela Dewhurst	For service to the community and the banking industry	
Dr Paul Dibb	For service to the Public Service	
James Edward Dibble, MBE	For service to the media and to the community	
Patrick Rickard Donovan, RFD ED	For service to the community and to industry	
Dr Ian Lovell Duncan	For service to medicine and to war veterans	
Ronald Millar Eades	For service to the Aboriginal community and to the hospitality industry	
Joan Marie Elliston	For service to the community and to the Girl Guides Association	
Arnold Erlanger	For service to the Jewish community	
Colleen Gladys Fahey	For service to education	
Dr Austen Stewart Ferguson	For service to medicine, to veterans and service personnel and to the community	
Barrie Ian Follows	For service to the civil aviation industry and to the community	
Ivor Pengelly Francis	For service to art as a painter, critic and teacher	
Victor Norman Gailey, MBE	For service to the sport of cycling	
Joseph Garamy	For service to the Hungarian community	
Dr Geoffrey Robert Gates	For service to medicine	
The Venerable Ian Gordon Combe George	For service to religion and to the community	
Ross Alexander Goven	For service to the World Expo '88o	
Kevin William Frank Graham	For service to the NSW Ambulance Service	
Dr Alan Gregory	For service to education and to the community	
Richard Marcus Griffin	For service to business and finance and to the community	
Ian Francis Grigg	For service to the automotive industry and to the community	
The Reverend Dr Leslie Bernhard Grope	For service to religion	
Louis Henry Hailey	For service to hockey	
Robert Keith Reeve Haines	For service to the visual arts	
Keith William Halkerston	For service to business and finance, and to the community	
Dr Neil Lewis Henry	For service to the dental profession	
Dorothy Margaret Hyslop	For service to the community as convenor of the Parliament House Embroidery Committee	
Gwenneth Ivy Illingworth	For service to people with impaired hearing	
William Edwin James	For service in the field of applied optics	
Dr Michael Braham Joel	For service to the community and to the media	
Denis Norman Johnston	For public service	
Dr William Michael Carmel Keane	For service to hospital administration	
Tasman Freer Knight	For service to scouting and to the community	
Bruce Langtry	For service to the community, particularly through the Langton Centre for Persons with Problems of Addiction	
Lawrence Gordon Lavelle, QFSM	For service to the community, particularly as Chief Fire Officer of the Metropolitan Fire Brigade's Board of Melbourne	
The Right Reverend Hurtle John Lewis	For service to religion and to the community	
Theodore Henryk Lustig	For service to the building industry, and to the community	
The Reverend Allan Charles Male, MBE	For services to the community, particularly disadvantaged youth	
James Irwin Faithfull Maple-Brown	For service to wool growing and marketing	
Charles William Martin	For service to the building industry, particularly as President of the Australian Institute of Building	
Bruce Stephens Matear	For service to the tourism industry	
Leonard Albert Mauger	For service to the media, particularly in the field of television broadcasting	
Robert Keith McKinnon	For public service, particularly in the field of telecommunications	
Lorna Mellor	For service to the community, particularly in promoting a better understanding of diabetes in youth	
Jean-Pierre Mignon	For service to the performing arts as Director of the Australian Nouveau Theatre	
Noel Keith Miller	For service to business and commerce, and to the community	
Thomas Lawrance Morris	For service to business and commerce, and to the community	
Professor Marie Draga Neale, OBE	For service to education, particularly for children with special exceptional needs	
Walter Martin Newington, BEM	For service to the welfare of veterans and to hospital administration	
Barry Stanley John O'Keefe QC	For service to local government	
Dr Michael Francis O'Rourke	For service to medicine, particularly in the care of persons affected by coronary disease and in the training of paramedic staff	
David Sydney Parker	For service to music and opera	
John Frederick Phillips	For service to the manufacturing industry	
Professor Vernon Douglas Plueckhahn, OBE ED	For service to forensic pathology	
Geoffrey Neil Pollard	For service to tennis	
Stanislaus Ivan Rapotec	For service to art	
Brian Donald Redpath	For service to the community and to local government	
John Francis Ross	For service to the media as a radio broadcasting engineer	
Noel John Ruddock	For service to athletics administration	
Bernard Francis Rush	For service to aeronautical engineering and to the community	
Richard Vincent Ryan	For service to the community	
Norman Bede Rydge, OBE	For service to the community	
Dr Clement William Semmler, OBE	For service to Australian literature	
Joseph Sicari	For service to the Italian community	
Walter Frederick Gordon Smith	For public service	
The Reverend Alan Deas Soares	For service to the community, particularly in the field of alcohol and drug abuse	
Dr Randolph Milton Spargo	For service to medicine, particularly in the fields of communicable and tropical diseases	
Roy Wilson Stanhope	For service to education, particularly in the field of science	
William Francis Sweetenham	For service to swimming as a coach	
Jiri Tancibudek	For service to music	
Ian Neil Templeman	For service to the arts in the fields of literature, painting and administration	
Dr Alfred Strickland Thomas, OBE	For service to horticulture, particularly the culture of roses	
Dr Norman John Perry Thomson	For service to primary industry, particularly in the growing of cotton	
Pamela Forsyth Threlfall	For service to the welfare of those suffering disabling head injuries	
William Kent Tickner	For service to sport	
Margaret Mary Topham	For service to medicine, particularly in the field of family therapy	
Kenneth Lowell Unsworth	For service to sculpture	
Linda Caprice Vogt (aka Mrs Evans)	For service to music	
Roderic Walter Voller	For service to architecture and to the community	
The Reverend Dr Godfrey Noel Vose	For service to religion	
Ronald Wagstaff, MBE	For service to the administration of the arts, and to the community	
Dr David Gaston Walker	For service to science, particularly in the field of nuclear technology	
Lucille Juanita Wallis	For service to the community through the War Widow's Guild of Australia	
John Sydney Warrington, OAM	For service to scouting	
The Reverend Harold Gibson Weir	For service to the community, particularly in the administration of justice, and to the welfare of victims of crime and of prisoners	
John West	For service to the media and the arts	
Dr Gretna Margaret Weste	For service to science, particularly in the field of botany	
Kenneth Henry Wiener	For service to the Jewish community	
Marie Joan Winch	For service to the Aboriginal community, particularly in the field of health	
Keith Henkel Wood	For service to local government engineering	
Harry Stewart Wragge	For service to telecommunications technology	
Gim Wah Yeo	For service to the Chinese community	
Richard Melville Young	For service to architecture	

==== Military Division ====
Branch	Recipient	Citation	Notes
Navy	Lt Commander Kenneth John Alderman	For services to the Royal Australian Navy, particularly as Lt Commander (Flying) HMAS Albatross	
Navy	Captain George Heron	For service to the Royal Australian Navy, particularly as Director, Naval Plans	
Navy	Captain Edward Graham Stubington	For service to the Royal Australian Navy, particularly as Director, Joint Planning in Headquarters Australian Defence Force	
Navy	Commodore Malcolm John Taylor	For service to the Royal Australian Navy, particularly as Chief of Staff to the Fleet Commander	
Army	Major John Patrick Cantwell	For service to the Australian Army as Adjutant of the Armoured Centre	
Army	Colonel Barry Joseph Collins	For service to the Australian Army in the discipline of field surgery	
Army	Major Alistair William Fraser	For service to the Australian Army in the field of personnel management in the Royal Corps of Australian Electrical and Mechanical Engineers	
Army	Colonel Robert Hennessy	For service to the Australian Army in the fields of doctrine and senior officer training	
Army	Major John David Loader	For service to the Australian Army as Officer Commanding Administration Company, 1st Recruit Training Battalion	
Army	Colonel Peter Malcolm McDougall	For service to the Australian Army, particularly to the Royal Australian Infantry Corps	
Army	Brigadier David John McLachlan	For service to the Australian Army as General Officer Commanding Logistic Command	
Army	Lt Colonel Darryl Graeme Poole	For service to the Australian Army in the field of Project Management	
Air Force	Sqn Ldr John Nicholas Blackburn	For service to the Royal Australian Air Force as manager of a pilot training aid project for the F/A-18 Hornet	
Air Force	Wing Commander Brenton Jack Espeland	For service to the Royal Australian Air Force as the Commanding Officer Central Flying School, East Sale	
Air Force	Sqn Ldr Stephen John Fielder	For service to the RAAF as a test pilot at Aircraft Research and Development Unit, Edinburgh, South Australia	
Air Force	Wing Commander Margaret Doreen Morrissy	For service to the Royal Australian Air Force as a staff officer within Health Services Branch	
Air Force	Group Captain Brendan Donald O'Loghlin	For service to the Royal Australian Air Force as Officer Commanding Air Base Butterworth, Malaysia	
Air Force	Group Captain Brian George Weston	For service to the Royal Australian Air Force as Officer Commanding, Base Support Wing Richmond	

=== Medal (OAM) ===
==== General Division ====
Recipient	Citation	Notes
Winifred Irene Leah Aitken	For service to the community, particularly drama production	
Leslie Andrews	For service to people with intellectual disabilities	
Marjorie Emily Andrews	For service to the community	
Norma Enid Archbold	For service to charitable organisations	
Gladys Irene Bailey	For service to the community and music	
Marietta Ballini	For service to the Italian community.	
Aubrey Allen Joseph George Bannah	For service to the community	
Alexander Barr	For service to local government	
Margaret Violet Barton	For service to the community	
Paul Colin Bayne	For service to mountaineering, particularly the Australian Bicentennial Everest Expedition	
Vivian George Bennett	For service to horticulture	
Margaret Ellen Bennett	For service to the community, particularly early childhood development	
Clarence George Billing	For service to photography	
Leslie George Blakers	For service to children with intellectual disabilities	
Lt Col Euan Boyd	For service to the welfare of veterans	
Sister Mary Edwin Brady	For service to the welfare of children and the elderly	
Richard John Maxwell Brennan	For service to the media, particularly film making	
John Andrew Brockman	For service to music	
Councillor Kathleen Patricia Brown	For service to the community and local government	
Bob Desmond Bruce	For service to surf lifesaving	
Thomas Harold Burgess	For service to Australian Football and cricket	
Nina Burnett	For service to community health	
James Beaton Campbell	For service to the community	
Regional Superintendent Keith Campbell	For service to community health.	
Mary Muriel Canty	For service to the welfare of veterans and to the community	
Peter Gareth Carey	For service to Australian football	
Frederick Carey	For service to the welfare of veterans and to local government	
Frank Chard	For service to the community	
Elizabeth Eileen Cliff	For service to the community and local government	
Robert James Cobbledick	For service to the community and Primary Industry	
James Comerford	For service to the trade union movement	
William Conroy	For service to the sport of greyhound racing	
Jemima Eliza West Constable	For service to the community	
Louis Joseph Anthony Cordony	For service to hairdressing	
Sergeant Norman Crookston	For service to mountaineering, particularly in the Australian Bicentennial Everest Expedition	
Mary Rose Cross	For service to the community	
Major Patrick Alexander Cullinan, SC	For service to mountaineering, particularly the Australian Bicentennial Everest Expedition.	
Frederick De Lacy	For service to the sport of swimming	
Emilio Deleidi	For service to the Italian community	
Jack Dinter	For service to the community and to children	
Stephen Lloyd George Dornan	For service to music	
Reginald James Down	For service to the trade union movement	
William Osborn Duffy	For service to the community	
Marilyn Nancy Elliot	For service to World Expo 1988	
John Ferguson Ewart	For service to the community and local government	
Kenneth Carr Ewen	For service to youth	
Ivor Henry Ewin	For service to cricket administration and to the community	
Dieter Fabig	For service to the German community	
Ethel Ruby Fick	For service to social welfare	
Fritz Otto Fischer	For service to the German community	
Muriel Violet Flynn	For service to the welfare of veterans	
John Joseph Ford	For service to the Aboriginal community	
Dr Peter Donald Graeme Fox	For service to medicine and to the community	
Kathleen Marjory Franke	For service to the community	
Frederick John Fullerton	For service to the sport of rowing	
Joyce Evelyn Gordon	For service to the community	
Charles Henry Grant	For service to local government	
Nancy Rowland Gray	For service to the community, particularly in the fields of local and family history	
Frederick Grinter	For service to the community	
Thomas Rush Hall	For service to the community, particularly the elderly	
Warrant Officer Class One Neil Alexander Hampson	For service to conservation and international relations	
Caroline Carmel Harris	For public service, particularly to the Aboriginal community	
Gordon Kenneth Harrison, MBE	For service to local government and to the community.	
Shirley Phyllis Hartley	For service to the community	
Doreen Clara Hennesy	For service to nursing	
Brother Kevin Herlihy	For service to youth.	
Jean Ann Hillier	For service to the community.	
Vernon Rima Howorth Hillman	For service to the Italian community.	
Owen Francis House	For service to veterans.	
Sadie Clarice Pollock Howe	For service to the community.	
John Inglis	For service to engineering.	
Eric Julius Irvin	For service to the community.	
Richard John Jackson	For service to primary industry.	
Samuel Gilbert Jericho	For service to conservation.	
Wendy Margaret Jones	For service to youth.	
Denzel Owen Joyce	For service to sport.	
Marle Richard Juster	For service to the Pastrycooks' Association of Queensland.	
Janet Karin	For service to ballet.	
Clive Raymond Keeble	For service to scouting.	
Elizabeth Jane Kefford	For service to the Aboriginal community.	
John Frederick Kent	For service to the community.	
Audrey Clare Keown	For service to education.	
Dr Andries Mentz Kleynhans	For service to chiropratic	
Norman Leigh Knopp	For service to lawn bowls	
Zygfryd Piotr (Peter) Koziell, BEM	For service to the Polish community	
Lilli Kuhnle	For service to the community	
Frederick Mathias Gustav Laczina	For service to the Hungarian community	
Brenda Joy Lake	For service to people with disabilities	
Reginald Gordon (Joe) Lambert	For service to the community	
Sister Una May Lee	For service to nursing	
Arthur Mark Leinster	For service to the community	
Kenneth Mitchell Lentfer	For service to the community	
Ronald John Lienert	For service to the pig farming industry	
Robert Sydney Thomas Long	For service to veterans	
Frances Mary Look	For service to World Expo 88	
David Brady Lowing	For service to the rural community	
Marjory Jean Lynch	For service to the community	
Ellen Agnes Lyndon	For service to the community, local history and conservation	
Graham Mabury	For service to community, particularly to youth	
William MacDougall	For service to the community, particularly the Royal Flying Doctor Service	
William James Marshall	For service to local government	
Rex Leon Marshall	For service to the Aboriginal community	
Daphne Marcella Martin	For service to the Spastic Centre of New South Wales	
June Margaret Mathews	For service to the Girl Guides’ Association	
Thelma Jean Matson	For service to nursing	
Colin Bruce Maxwell	For service to Rugby Union football	
Councillor Reginald Beach McCallum	For service to local government	
Leslie James McCarthy	For service to the community	
Mervyn Robert McDonald	For service to cycling	
Harold Ivan McGilvary	For service to boating safety	
Elizabeth Ruth McGrath	For service to the community	
Jennifer Anne McGuirk	For service to the community	
Councillor Betty McLean	For service to local government and to the community	
Alexander Campbell McMurtrie	For service to the Wangi Wangi Volunteer Fire Brigade	
Kathleen Nancy Medwin	For service to the community	
Keith Stewart Meredith	For service to the transport industry, particularly in the fields of roads and shipping	
Terence Vincent Minear	For service to water and to angling	
John Francis Miner	For service to Rugby Union football	
John Cyril Moon	For service to the community of Cowra, particularly through service clubs and welfare organisations	
Edith Joyce Morgan	For service to the community	
Jerzy Marian Moskala	For service to the Polish community	
Jon Robert Muir	For service to mountaineering, particularly the Australian Bicentennial Everest Expedition	
Doreen Annie Isobel Mules	For service to the community	
Joan Edith Nelson	For service to Red Cross and to the community	
Ann Foster Newmarch	For service to art	
Sheila Maureen Nicholls	For service to people with intellectual disabilities	
Elizabeth Eleanor Nissen	For service to Red Cross and to the community	
Mervyn Francis Xavier Nixon	For service to the trade union movement	
Bede Francis O'Brien	For service to lawn bowls	
Carl Bernard Offszanka	For service to the community	
Charles Joseph Oorloff	For service to Migrant Assistance and to the Sri-Lankan community	
The Reverend Geoffrey Samuel Parish	For service to migrants, particularly through the Refugee Council of Australia	
Alexander Robert Patten, DFM	For service to horticulture	
Merle Perring	For service to the elderly	
Marijan Persic	For service to the Slovenian community	
Sidney John Peryman, ED	For service to mountaineering, particularly the Australian Bicentennial Everest Expedition	
Dorothy May Piggott	For public service	
Kenneth Samuel Pope	For service to World Expo 88	
James Priest	For service to the elderly	
Brian Peter Purcell	For service to World Expo 88	
Eric James Quarmby	For public service	
Kenneth Douglas Ratcliff	For service to industrial safety	
Herbert Jack Read	For service to croquet	
Victor Alexander Rebikoff	For service to migrants	
Michael Anthony Rheinberger	For service to mountaineering, particularly the Australian Bicentennial Everest Expedition	
Harry Aubrey Riggs	For service to local government	
Pinchas (Pinie) Ringelblum	For service to the Jewish community	
Robert George Roche	For service to World Expo 88	
Marie Evelyn Rogers	For service to World Expo 88	
David Arthur Rogers	For service to the community	
William David Rose	For service to the Royal Far West Children's Health Scheme	
Warren Joseph Saunders	For service to cricket	
Allan Roy Sefton, BEM	For service to conservation	
Edna Mary Sharrock, MBE	For service to the Country Women's Association	
Dorothy Evelyn Shaw	For service to people with impaired hearing	
Nancy Jean Shelley	For service to the Peace Movement	
Joan Irene Simms	For public service	
Leslie Kenneth Smith	For service to youth	
Leo William Smith	For service to the community	
Clifford Patrick Spellman	For service to the community	
Elton Walter Staffsmith	For service to the community	
Francis James Stahlhut	For service to the Totally and Permanently Incapacitated Association of Queensland	
Peter Maxwell John Sterling	For service to Rugby League football	
Clifford Davies Stevens	For service to veterans	
Alwina Phyllis Stewart	For service to veterans	
Halina Teresa Szunejko	For service to education and to the Polish community	
Sydney Taylor	For service to people with intellectual disabilities	
Kathleen Mary Taylor	For service to the community	
Warwick David Kenneth Teasdale, RFD RANR RFD	For service to the community	
Graeme Anthony Thomas	For service to the elderly	
Nora Esme Thornhill	For service to the Alcohol and Drug Foundation of Victoria	
Major James Francis Truscott	For service to mountaineering, particularly the Australia Bicentennial Everest Expedition	
Richard Neville Tucker	For service to the community, particularly through the Lions Club	
Marjorie Constance Turbayne	For service to the community	
James Ashlin Tweedale	For service to people with physical disabilities	
Gordon Lewis Vincent	For service to the community	
Paula Irene Voltz	For service to veterans	
Nikola Vrbica	For service to the Yugoslav community	
Gilbert Weaver	For service to youth	
Olive Claire Weston	For service to people with intellectual disabilities	
Dr Blair Widmer	For service to the community	
Lyle Eustace Wright	For service to horticulture	
Derek Fuller Wrigley	For service to people with physical disabilities	
Marcus John Young	For service to the community	

==== Military Division ====
Branch	Recipient	Citation	Notes
Navy	Chief Petty Officer Gloria Jocelyn Allan	For services to the Royal Australian Navy, particularly as the officer's mess supervisor, Australian Defence Force Academy	
Navy	Chief Petty Officer Rodney John Ferguson	For service to the Royal Australian Navy as the Deputy Sea Training Co-ordinator for the Australian Submarine Squadron	
Navy	Petty Officer Stephen Francis Given	For service to the Royal Australian Navy, particularly for establishing the Navy Photographic Archive	
Navy	Chief Petty Officer Paul Raymond Maudlin	For service to the Royal Australian Navy, particularly as the Naval Stores Manager in HMAS Torrens	
Navy	Lieutenant Andrew Wesley Shearman	For service to the Royal Australian Navy as a member of the Personnel Liaison Team	
Army	Sergeant Stephen Sidney Best	For service to the Australian Army as the Unit Pay Representative, Base Support Unit, Oakey	
Army	Captain Winston James Coles	For service to the Australian Army as the Senior Electronics Artificer with the 2nd Base Workshop Battalion	
Army	Warrant Officer Class Two Michael Coyle	For service to the Australian Army as the CSM 16th Battalion, the Royal Western Australian Regiment	
Army	Warrant Officer Class Two Rodney Roy Denaro	For service to the Australian Army in the field of catering	
Army	Warrant Officer Class One Peter Boyce Dwyer	For service to the Australian Army in the field of Storeman Technical General Training	
Army	Captain Keith Edwards Evans	For service to the Australian Army in the field of preventive medicine	
Army	Warrant Officer Class One Neale Roy Jones	For service to the Australian Army in the field of inventory management	
Army	Warrant Officer Class One Michael John Malone	For service to the Australian Army as Regimental Sergeant Major of 1st Commando Regiment	
Army	Staff Sergeant John Daryl Parker	For service to the Australian Army as the medical assistant to 22nd Construction Squadron, 1st Construction Regiment	
Army	Warrant Officer Class One Kenneth Russell Ryley	For service to the Australian Army in the field of Army community services	
Army	Warrant Officer Class One Peter Julian Smith	For service to the Australian Army as the master gunner, Land Command Artillery	
Army	Captain Ullrich Hans Wauer	For service to the Australian Army in the field of health training	
Army	Warrant Officer Class One Lesley Anne Wenban	For service to the Australian Army in the field of supply computing	
Army	Warrant Officer Class One Jack Woods DCM	For service to the Australian Army as the Regimental Sergeant Major of the 49th Battalion, the Royal Queensland Regiment	
Air Force	Flight Sergeant Stewart William Bridge	For service to the Royal Australian Air Force as Maintenance Co-ordinator at No 492 Squadron Edinburgh, South Australia	
Air Force	Flight Sergeant Francis William Clifford	For service to the Royal Australian Air Force as the senior NCO in charge of the Maintenance Control Section at the Air Transport Squadron of the Papua New Guinea Defence Force	
Air Force	Warrant Officer Dennis Raymond Doggett	For service to the Royal Australian Air Force as a Warrant Officer Engineer at the RAAF School of Technical Training	
Air Force	Flight Sergeant Mario Salvatore Mangano	For service to the Royal Australian Air Force as a technician employed in the maintenance and distribution of Royal Air Force Technical Publications	
Air Force	Flight Sergeant Stephen Andrew McIver	For service to the Royal Australian Air Force as a flight steward at No 33 Squadron, Royal Australian Air Force Base Richmond, New South Wales	
Air Force	Flight Sergeant Barry Nelson O'Sullivan	For service to the Royal Australian Air Force as a supply supervisor at Supply Support Squadron Williamtown, New South Wales	
Air Force	Flight Sergeant Kenneth Ian Rowland	For service to the Royal Australian Air Force as a photographer with the Aircraft Research and Development Unit, Royal Australian Air Force Base Edinburgh, South Australia	
Air Force	Sergeant Anthony Philip Smith	For service to the Royal Australian Air Force as the senior NCO at Headquarters, Royal Australian Air Force Base East Sale, Victoria	
