= Dee Brock =

Founder of the Dallas Cowboys Cheerleaders (1930–2026)

- Born: Dorothy Faye Sala; June 7, 1930; Covington, Oklahoma, U.S.
- Died: September 23, 2026 (aged 96); Tyler, Texas, U.S.
- Education: University of North Texas (BA, MA, PhD)
- Occupations: Educator; cheerleading director; model
- Spouse: Bob Brock (divorced)
- Children: 3

Dorothy Faye "Dee" Brock (née Sala; June 7, 1930 – September 23, 2026) was an American educator, model and cheerleading director. She was the founder and first director of the Dallas Cowboys Cheerleaders. Brock was hired by Tex Schramm in the early 1960s to create a cheerleading squad for the Dallas Cowboys. She brought the squad to the Cowboys' first Super Bowl appearance in 1971 at Super Bowl V. Originally a co-ed squad consisting of high school students, the squad was later rebranded by Brock as an all-girl group. She was responsible for racially integrating the squad in 1965 and designing the first iteration of the now-famous uniform.

Brock was an educator in Texas and taught in the public schools. She was a teacher at Thomas Jefferson High School in Dallas until 1966 and helped found Dallas College El Centro Campus, the first campus of Dallas College. She went on to serve as senior vice president of educational programming and director of adult-learning programming at PBS in Washington, D.C.

== Early life ==
Dorothy Faye Sala was born on June 7, 1930, in Covington, Oklahoma, the daughter of Lester and Vera Mae (née Bowers) Sala, and grew up in Wright City, Texas. Her father was a union organizer at Sinclair Oil who later ran a jukebox business and owned a drugstore. Brock was a member of her New London high school's cheerleading squad. She earned a bachelor's degree in 1950 and a master's degree in English in 1956 from the University of North Texas. She earned a doctorate degree from North Texas in 1985.

== Career ==
Brock worked as a schoolteacher in the Dallas Public School District from 1952 to 1966, teaching at Thomas Jefferson High School. In the 1960s, she helped found Dallas College El Centro Campus, the first campus of Dallas College and the first community college in Dallas.

She founded the East Texas Book Fest in 2013.

Brock served as senior vice president of educational programming and director of adult-learning programming at PBS.

She also worked as a fashion model, debuting a Christian Dior gown at the New Look Fashion Show and walking the runway for Neiman Marcus.

== Dallas Cowboys Cheerleaders ==
In the early 1960s, Tex Schramm approached Brock with the concept of hiring models to stand on the sidelines of Dallas Cowboys football games as a way to boost attendance. Brock suggested recruiting high school students from the local 71 schools to work for free, instead of hiring models. Schramm appointed Brock as head of the project, which would become the Dallas Cowboys Cheerleaders. She was paid $600 a year to manage and coach the co-ed squad, which were called "The Cowbelles and their Beaux". In 1969, Brock dropped male cheerleaders from her program, making it an all-girl squad. In 1965, Brock went to Schramm to lobby for integrating the squad, advocating for Black cheerleaders. She brought on Frances Roberson, a teacher from an all-Black school, to work with her to integrate the squad. By 1971, half of the Dallas Cowboys Cheerleaders were black.

In 1971, the Dallas Cowboys went to the Super Bowl V, but Schramm would not pay for the cheerleaders to attend, so Brock appeared on a local television station and successfully appealed for a sponsor. The following year, the Cowboys went to Super Bowl VI, and Brock again found a sponsor by going on television. In 1972, after the team moved into Texas Stadium, Brock decided to rebrand. She met with Schramm and decided that the cheerleaders should be older, ages eighteen to mid-twenties, and that they should do more dancing and less chanting. She hired a choreographer named Texie Waterman, splitting her own salary to pay Waterman. Brock also suggested new uniforms.

Brock ran the Dallas Cowboys Cheerleaders until the mid-1970s, retiring at the end of the 1975 season. She was succeeded by Suzanne Mitchell.

She was awarded a Lifetime Achievement Award by the Dallas Cowboys Cheerleaders in June 2022.

== Personal life and death ==
Brock married Bob Brock, a society reporter with the Dallas Times Herald; together they had three sons. She and her husband later divorced. Brock lived in Tyler, Texas, until her death there on September 23, 2026, at the age of 96.
