= Michael Malone (disambiguation) =

Michael Malone (born 1971) is an American basketball coach.

Michael, Mick or Mike Malone may also refer to:

== Sports ==
- Mick Malone (cricketer) (born 1950), Australian cricketer
- Mick Malone (hurler) (born 1950), Irish hurler

== Others ==
- Michael Malone (author) (1942–2022), American author and television writer
- Michael Malone (bishop), bishop emeritus of the Roman Catholic Diocese of Maitland-Newcastle
- Michael Malone (businessman) (born 1969), former managing director and founder of Australian ISP iiNet
- Michael E. Malone (born 1967), member of the Maryland House of Delegates
- Michael P. Malone (1940–1999), American historian
- Michael S. Malone (born 1954), American author and former Forbes editor
- Michael J. (Mick) Malone, OAM (born 1947), Australian soldier and author

== Fictional characters ==
- Michael Malone, a parody of Michael Moore, in the film An American Carol (2008)
- Michael Malone, the druid and godfather of Ruth Galloway's daughter who goes by the name Cathbad, in Elly Griffiths' Ruth Galloway series of novels
- Mike Malone, a character in the film 40 Guns to Apache Pass (1967)
- Michael Malone, a character in The Unicorne Files series, by Chris d'Lacey

== See also ==
- John Michael Malone, a character in the TV series Without a Trace
