= Muirgel =

Muirgel was an Irish woman who killed a Viking chieftain in 882 AD.

Muirgel was born to an important leader in Ulster, Maelechlainn. According to the Chronicum Scotorum, she slayed the son of Ausli with the help of Otir, son of Eirgni. The son of Ausli was an important chieftain of the long time enemy Vikings. Later historians recalled this act and similar ones as a display by woman of "loyalty of kith, kin and country.”

Though the majority of sources point to Muirgel's story as unfolding with the slaying of the foreign chieftain, a few sources point to a slightly different version of her life. It is reported that Muirgel may have married a Viking named Iarnkne (who may or may nor be the son of Ausli) in order to create an alliance between the two peoples. This version of her story is further expanded on in The Mystery of the Angels and Bloody Sunday: The Story of the 1920 Irish Rebellion, both fiction novels by Joseph Murphy.
