= Dallas Cowboys Cheerleaders II =

1980 American comedy-drama television film

- Based on: Dallas Cowboys Cheerleaders
- Written by: Stephen Kandel
- Directed by: Michael O'Herlihy
- Starring: John Davidson; Laraine Stephens; Julie Hill
- Music by: Jimmie Haskell
- Country of origin: United States
- Original language: English

Production
- Producers: Alan Godfrey; James T. Aubrey; Robert Hamner; Jay Aubrey
- Cinematography: Robert Jessup
- Editors: Bernard Balmuth; Robert Crawford; John Woodcock
- Running time: 98 minutes
- Production company: Aubrey/Hamner Productions

Original release
- Network: ABC
- Release: January 13, 1980

Dallas Cowboys Cheerleaders II is an American comedy-drama television film based on the Dallas Cowboys Cheerleaders. It is the sequel to the 1979 film Dallas Cowboys Cheerleaders and was released in 1980.

== Plot ==
The Dallas Cowboys Cheerleaders director, Suzanne Mitchell (Stephens) prepares the squad for a new season, including the Super Bowl and an upcoming USO tour.

== Cast ==
- John Davidson as Terry Killian
- Laraine Stephens as Suzanne Mitchell
- Julie Hill as Patti Ames
- Roxanne Gregory as Diane Tyler
- Candy Ann Brown as Candy Beaumont
- Natasha Ryan as Hannah
- Rod McCary as Captain Webner
- Ray Wise as Dr. Simmons
- Joe E. Tata as Pete
- Duane Thomas as Tim Waterson
- Irma P. Hall as Dora
- Texie Waterman as Herself
