= Suzanne Mitchell (Dallas Cowboys) =

American artistic director and public relations professional

- Born: 7 July 1943; Fort Worth, Texas, U.S.
- Died: 27 September 2016 (aged 73); Fredericksburg, Texas
- Education: University of Oklahoma
- Parent(s): Willis Wilson Mitchell; Nell Mitcham

Suzanne Mitchell (7 July 1943 – 27 September 2016) was an American artistic director and public relations professional who served as the director of the Dallas Cowboys Cheerleaders from 1976 to 1989. She was responsible for the Dallas Cowboys Cheerleaders rise in popularity and their status as sex symbols. Mitchell was also responsible for creating the role of goodwill ambassadors for the cheerleaders, requiring them to volunteer in orphanages, hospitals, and at telethons to boost public image and organized their involvement in touring with United Service Organizations.

== Early life and education ==
Mitchell was born in Fort Worth, Texas on July 7, 1943. She was raised in the Dallas–Fort Worth area. Her mother, Nell Mitcham Mitchell, was a nurse. Her father, Colonel Willis Wilson Mitchell, was a commercial pilot for American Airlines and a retired military officer who served as third in command under General Dwight D. Eisenhower in Africa during World War II.

Mitchell was on her high school drill team and studied at the University of Oklahoma, graduating with a degree in journalism.

== Career ==
Mitchell worked for the Ziff Davis publishing company in New York and, later, for an advertising office. She also did public relations work for the United States Olympic Ski Team. After securing an interview with Tex Schramm, general manager of the Dallas Cowboys, she was hired as his administrative assistant. Mitchell is responsible for the Cowboys Cheerleaders' rise as American sex symbols and their continued role as goodwill ambassadors. She increased the number of cheerleaders on the squad from fourteen to thirty-two and presided over Texie Waterman, who was hired by Dee Brock as the squad's choreographer, working with her to define a unique dance style for the squad. In a 1978 interview with Sports Illustrated, Mitchell said, "obviously we don't put the girls in those uniforms to hide anything. Sports has always had a very clean, almost Puritanical aspect about it, but by the same token, sex is a very important part of our lives. What we've done is combine the two.

After receiving a call from the William Morris Agency requesting that the cheerleaders perform at the C&W Awards in Los Angeles, Mitchell began booking the squad for public appearances, including The Osmonds television special and The Love Boat. She and the squad received negative criticism from Evangelical Christians for the uniforms and sex-symbol status, so Mitchell required the cheerleaders to volunteer with telethons and visit orphanages and nursing homes to enhance their public image. Mitchell agreed to help with the making of the 1979 television movie Dallas Cowboys Cheerleaders starring Jane Seymour.

Under her direction, the Dallas Cowboys Cheerleaders started the USO tours in December 1979. Mitchell went on eighteen USO tours in South Korea, Iceland, Greenland, and Beirut. After Jerry Jones bought the Dallas Cowboys in 1989 and fired Schramm, Mitchell resigned from her post as director. Fourteen cheerleaders quit the squad following her resignation.

== Personal life and death ==
Mitchell married shortly after graduating from college, but was divorced a few years later.

Mitchell died in Fredericksburg, Texas on September 27, 2016, after battling pancreatic cancer.

== Legacy ==
Mitchell was the main subject of the 2018 documentary film Daughters of the Sexual Revolution: The Untold Story of the Dallas Cowboys Cheerleaders.

She was portrayed by Laraine Stephens in the 1979 film Dallas Cowboys Cheerleaders and the 1980 sequel Dallas Cowboys Cheerleaders II.
