= O.K. Crackerby! =

American television sitcom (1965–1966)

- Genre: Sitcom
- Created by: Cleveland Amory; Abe Burrows
- Starring: Burl Ives; Hal Buckley; Brooke Adams; Brian Corcoran; Joel Davidson
- Country of origin: United States
- Original language: English
- No. of seasons: 1
- No. of episodes: 17

Production
- Camera setup: Single-camera
- Running time: 30 minutes

Original release
- Network: ABC
- Release: September 16, 1965 – January 6, 1966

O.K. Crackerby! is an American television sitcom that aired on ABC from September 16, 1965, to January 6, 1966.

== Synopsis ==
O.K. Crackerby is a billionaire widower from Oklahoma who has three children: 16-year-old Cynthia, 13-year old O. K., Jr., and 9-year-old Hobert. The family moves to Palm Beach, Florida, go to the exclusive Hotel Havenhurst, and discover the staff refuses to rent out the entire penthouse floor to them. Crackerby asks to use the telephone, and in five minutes purchases the hotel, which he renames Havenhurst-Crackerby, and the family turns the penthouse floor into their new home.

Crackerby wants his children to be able to fit into high society so he hires an impoverished Harvard graduate St. John Quincy (who pronounces his name Sihn-Jihn-Kwihn-zee) as a tutor. Quincy initially turned down the job, but accepted it after Crackerby deposited $5,000 into his bank account, provided him with a chauffeur-driven limousine, bought the sporting goods store Quincy worked at, and had him fired. Throughout the short-lived series Crackerby and Quincy alternate between verbally fighting over differing moral values and banding together to battle those they both consider social snobs.

Other recurring characters are Susan, Quincy’s girl friend, and Slim, an employee back at the Oklahoma ranch. Slim spends most of his time in an office, complete with a bed and refrigerator, so he can stay near the phone in order to fulfill Crackerby’s orders within five minutes. He even has a massive 1960s-style mainframe computer to provide any information his boss may need.

== Cast ==
- Burl Ives as O.K. Crackerby
- Hal Buckley as St. John Quincy
- Brooke Adams as Cynthia Crackerby
- Brian Corcoran as O.K. Crackerby, Jr.
- Joel Davidson as Hobart Crackerby
- Dick Foran as Slim

Recurring:

- Laraine Stephens as Susan Wentworth (13 episodes)
- John Indrisano as John, the chauffeur (5 episodes)
- William Kinney as Joe, the bellboy (3 episodes)

== Ratings and cancellation ==
Nielsen ratings ranked the series as 71st out of 102 evening television programs, but before ABC could announce its cancellation Burl Ives sent out letters to newspaper columnists stating, "O.K. Crackerby is over"... as "the show never did get off the ground in the script department." The last episode of the series was broadcast on January 6, 1966.

== Episodes ==
No.	Title	Directed by	Written by	Original release date
1	"O.K. Crackerby Arrives"	Rod Amateau, Abe Burrows	Abe Burrows, Cleveland Amory	September 16, 1965
Crackerby and his children leave Oklahoma and arrive at Palm Beach. When the staff of the Havenhurst Hotel refuse to let them rent the entire penthouse floor Crackerby makes a telephone call, buys the hotel, renames it the Havenhurst Crackerby, and moves into the penthouse. He then sets out to hire St. John Quincy as a tutor for his children.
2	"The Wellecliffe Story"	Rod Amateau	Abe Burrows, Terry Ryan	September 23, 1965
Crackerby is offended when British Lord Wellecliffe seems to be snubbing an invitation to attend O.K.'s barbecue. He starts to buy up Wellecliffe's financial holdings, but Wellecliffe gets the better end of the deal.
3	"The Griffin Story"	Tom Montgomery	Earl Barrett, Robert C. Dennis	September 30, 1965
Crackerby is determined to buy his son Hobart a pet Griffin, despite being told it is mythical creator that never existed.
4	"Crackerby for Treasurer"	Leonard J. Horn	Richard Baer	June 26, 1965
Hobart wants to be elected treasurer at his grammar school so he hires a skywriter to write his campaign slogan across the city skies, and plans a rally with famous celebrities in attendance.
5	"Crackerby’s Tutor"	Rod Amateau	Arnold Margolin, Jim Parker	October 14, 1965
St. John Quincy is doing such a good job of tutoring the Crackerby children in social graces that O.K. feels ignorant and socially inadequate. He secretly hires his own tutor to catch up with his family.
6	"The Saint John Raid"	David Nelson	Bill O'Hallareen	October 21, 1965
Crackerby’s Oklahoma neighbor Aggie comes to Palm Beach and lures St. John away to tutor her "children" – two beautiful young women. Crackerby and Slim try to woo him back to his former tutoring job.
7	"Who Was That Lady You Saw Me With?"	Leonard J. Horn	Cleveland Armory, Abe Burrows, Terry Ryan	October 28, 1965
Crackerby is smitten by Miss Belmont, a beautiful young society lady. St. John believes she’s only interested in the wealthy man's money, and tries to warn his employer.
8	"Woodman, Spare That Family Tree"	David Nelson	Arnold Margolin, Jim Parker	November 4, 1965
Snubbish Huntington Hawthorn II forbids her son to attend low-born Cynthia’s sweet 16 party, so Crackerby tries to find some bad apples in the Hawthorne's family tree.
9	"No Deposit, No Return"	David Nelson	Tom Adair, James B. Allardice	November 11, 1965
An oil sheik gives Crackerby a harem girl as a gift, and to refuse to accept her would dishonor the sheik, and mean the death of the girl. Crackerby needs to use some down-home diplomacy to resolve the problem.
10	"Crackerby’s Unfinished Symphony"	Jack Shea	Cleveland Armory, Abe Burrows, James Menzies	November 18, 1965
Aunt Penny’s Palm Beach Phiharmonic Society is about to go under, so Crackerby and Slim try to hire a symphony orchestra and a famous conductor to perform next Saturday night.
11	"Ol' Sam"	Gary Nelson	Bill O'Hallareen	November 25, 1965
Crackerby goes on a camping trip and meets Ol' Sam, a fisherman living a simple life. But is the man trying to pull a con job on Crackerby?
12	"Crackerby Stops the Press"	Claudio Guzman	Bill O'Hallareen	December 2, 1965
A college bestows an honorary degree on Crackerby. The ceremony receives mostly positive news coverage, but one gossip columnist plans to reveal the man's country-hick background and ruin his high-society efforts. Out of anger Crackerby wants to buy the newspaper she works for just so he can fire her.
13	"Crackerby and the Cuckoo Game"	James Sheldon	Bill O'Hallareen	December 9, 1965
Crackerby's nephew Davey purchases 1,000 cuckoo clocks, and hopes to sell them at a profit so he can marry the girl of his dreams.
14	"Bitter Ravioli"	James Shea	James B. Allardice	December 16, 1965
Crackerby goes to Hollywood to see his newly purchased movie studio. He must use his country know-how when a prima donna starlet falls for an Italian playboy.
15	"Smile and the World…"	Ezra Stone	George Balzer	December 23, 1965
A doctor tells Crackerby his blood pressure is dangerously high, and he must change his ways to lower it to a safe level. Crackerby forces himself to go from angry and pushy to happy and easy-going.
16	"3 + 1 = 1"	Tom Montgomery	Phil Davis	December 30, 1965
Crackerby wants to join the Tarriers, the city’s most exclusive gentleman's club, which hasn't accepted a new member since 1925, and has only 3 surviving members.
17	"Operation Susan"	Seymour Robbie	Cleveland Armory, Abe Burrows. Rich Eustis	January 6, 1966
St. John and Susan are best man and maid of honor at a friend's wedding, and they ponder the status of their 5-year courtship. When Susan becomes interested in another man St. John realizes how much he cares for her, and declares his love for her.
