= The Walter Winchell File =

- Genre: Crime drama Police drama Anthology
- Developed by: Desilu Productions
- Directed by: Jacques Tourneur; Jerry Thorpe
- Presented by: Walter Winchell
- Theme music composer: E.C. Norton
- Country of origin: United States
- Original language: English
- No. of seasons: 1
- No. of episodes: 39

Production
- Executive producer: Desi Arnaz
- Producer: Bert Granet
- Production location: New York City
- Running time: 30 mins.
- Production company: Desilu

Original release
- Network: ABC
- Release: October 2, 1957 – March 28, 1958

The Walter Winchell File is a television crime drama series that initially aired on ABC from 1957 to 1958, dramatizing cases from the New York City Police Department that were covered in the New York Daily Mirror. The series featured columnist and announcer Walter Winchell, John Larch, George Cisar, Robert Anderson, Robert Brubaker, Dolores Donlon, and Gene Barry, a year before he was cast in the lead of NBC's Bat Masterson.

Thirty-nine episodes were produced; the first twenty-six aired on ABC during the 1957–1958 season (sponsored by Revlon), and the final thirteen were seen in syndication in 1959.

== Other notable guest stars ==
- Dan Blocker
- Charles Bronson
- Mike Connors
- James Drury
- Bill Erwin
- Brian G. Hutton
- Jack Klugman
- Diane Ladd
- Martin Landau
- John Larch
- Tom Laughlin
- Ruta Lee
- Gavin MacLeod
- Strother Martin
- Ed Nelson
- Mike Ragan
- Marion Ross
- Harry Dean Stanton
- Robert Vaughn
- Robert J. Wilke

== Selected episodes ==
- The Steep Hill, directed by Jacques Tourneur (1957)
- House on Biscayne Bay, directed by Jacques Tourneur (1958)
- The Stopover, directed by Jacques Tourneur (1958)
