= Doug Malone =

Doug Malone may refer to:

- Doug Malone (Canadian football), 2011 Hamilton Tiger-Cats season
- Doug Malone, character in 40 Guns to Apache Pass
