= Gilla Críst Ua Máel Eóin =

Irish historian, died 1127

Gilla Críst Ua Máel Eóin (anglicised as Christian Malone; died 1127) was an Irish historian and Abbot of Clonmacnoise.

== Family background ==
Ó Maoil Eoin (now anglicised as Malone), denotes descent from a grandson of a person baptised in honour of Saint John.

This assumption was introduced long after Maol Eoin had lived. It was contrived to demonstrate a long-standing association with the Church. As such "maol" is often described as meaning bald and then quickly followed by the idea of a monks shaved head. While "maol" does mean bald it also can mean thin. However, in both cases it is used in reference with the landscape; bald might mean lacking in trees, and thin might mean a peninsula or island. It defines a feature of the landscape that is associated with the family. The use of maol, in a family name, is found recorded some 200 years before Maol Eoin was born. Maolrunaigh (Mulrooney)was a past family name that was passed down, mostly in part, through the generations. This was a common way to include the name of the bride's father, as a mark of respect. If Maol Eoin means devotee of St John, then it would stand to reason that Maolrunaigh must be a devotee of St. Rooney. However, a St. Rooney does nor exist.

The Ó Maoil Eoin were wrongly accorded kinship with the Uí Briúin, based on the statement that "Maoliosa {son of Tairrdelbach Ua Conchobair}, Bishop of Roscommon, who had a son named Maol Eoin ... a quo O'Maoil Eoin, anglicised Malone." However, the family were already in existence before Tairrdelbach was born, so the kinship is mistaken, or possibly a forgery, though at least one very old family tradition holds the name was intended to signify a friendship or political alliance at the time of baptism.

They seemed to have been an ecclesiastical or Erenagh family native to the area, with no links to any great royal houses.

== Abbot Gilla Críst ==
Gilla Críst is the earliest known member of the family associated with Clonmacnoise, and perhaps the ancestor of all subsequent Ó Maoil Eoin's associated with it.

He was associated with Tairrdelbach Ua Conchobair, as attested in an entry in Chronicon Scotorum sub anno 1124 - "The great bell-tower of Cluaín moccu Nóis was completed by Gilla Críst ua Maíleoin and Tairdelbach ua Conchobuir."

Two years later the same text records that "Gilla Críst ua Maíleoin, abbot of Cluaín moccu Nóis, the fount of wisdom and charity, the head of wealth and riches of Ireland, rested."

== Chronicon Scotorum ==
Chronicon Scotorum is an account of Irish affairs that ends in an unfinished manner in the entry dated 1150. Gilla Crist has been associated with the text as its compiler, but if so, it was continued at some point after his death. His actual role in relation to the Chronicon is uncertain.

== Later Ó Máel Eóins and Malones ==
Subsequent abbots included

- Áed Ua Máel Eóin (died 1153)
- Tigernach Ua Máel Eóin (died 1172).

Later Bishop of Clonmacnoise included:

- Cathal Ua Máel Eóin (fl. 1187–1207)
- Áed Ó Máel Eóin (I) (1214–1220)
- Áed Ó Máel Eóin (II) (1227–1236)
- 1461. The Dean O'Malone, the most learned man in all Ireland, died at Cluain-muc-Nois-mic-Fidhaigh.

Ruaidhrí Ó Máel Eóin, canon of Tuam and Clonmacnoise, administered the Clonmacnoise diocese from about 1520 to 1540. He was elected Bishop of Ardagh in 1517 and died in 1540.

Richard Ó Malone of Donore, County Westmeath, "enjoyed the distinction of the being the first musician pardoned by Queen Elizabeth, the date being 1565."

== See also ==
- Máel Muire mac Céilechair
- Lebor na hUidre
- Flann Mainistrech
- Faddan More Psalter
- Gaelic Ireland
- Early history of Ireland
