= Baggy Pants and the Nitwits =

- Genre: Cartoon series
- Created by: Arte Johnson
- Directed by: Brad Case; Gerry Chiniquy; Sid Marcus; Robert McKimson; Spencer Peel
- Voices of: Ruth Buzzi; Arte Johnson
- Composers: Steve DePatie; Doug Goodwin
- Country of origin: United States
- Original language: English
- No. of seasons: 1
- No. of episodes: 16

Production
- Producers: David H. DePatie; Friz Freleng
- Editor: Rick Steward
- Running time: 30 minutes
- Production company: DePatie-Freleng Enterprises

Original release
- Network: NBC
- Release: September 10 – October 28, 1977

Baggy Pants and the Nitwits is a 1977 American animated series produced by DePatie-Freleng Enterprises and broadcast on NBC.

== Overview ==
Though the characters appeared together in the show's introduction, they each appeared separately in their own episodes. Each 30-minute episode of Baggy Pants and the Nitwits contained two segments: one for Baggy Pants and the other for the Nitwits.

Baggy Pants is an anthropomorphic cat mimicking Charlie Chaplin's "Little Tramp" character, right down to Chaplin's signature toothbrush mustache and walking cane. Similar to Chaplin and the Pink Panther, Baggy Pants performed all of his misadventures silently, without a spoken dialogue by any of the characters in his segments.

The Nitwits is about an elderly superhero named Tyrone (voiced by Arte Johnson) who, by public demand, re-emerged from retirement to again fight crime, taking cases at his own discretion with help from his wife Gladys (Ruth Buzzi) and his hopping cane which he called "Elmo" which, among other things, helped Tyrone and Gladys to fly.

Johnson and Buzzi adapted and reprised the roles they had originated in Rowan & Martin's Laugh-In, with much of the adult innuendo (including Tyrone's original last name Horneigh) being removed to keep the cartoon family-friendly. In the opening titles of The Nitwits segment, Johnson himself was credited with having "created The Nitwits for television".

== Episodes ==
No.	Title	Original release date
1	"Lost Dog" "The Hopeless Diamond Caper"	September 10, 1977 February 26, 1979(BBC One)
2	"Construction Caper" "Earthquake McBash"	March 5, 1979 (BBC One)
3	"Circus Circus" "The Evil Father Nature"	March 12, 1979 (BBC One)
4	"Baggy Pants and Forgetful Freddy" "Bustle Hustle"	March 19, 1979 (BBC One)
5	"The Moving Man" "The Dynamic Energy Robber"	March 26, 1979 (BBC One)
6	"The Painter's Helper" "Splish Splash"	April 2, 1979 (BBC One)
7	"The Electric Girlfriend" "Mercury Mike and his Jet Bike"	April 9, 1979 (BBC One)
8	"A Pressing Job" "False Face Filbert"	April 23, 1979 (BBC One)
9	"The Haunting Experience" "Genie Meanie"	April 30, 1979 (BBC One)
10	"Horse Laff" "Chicken Lady"	May 14, 1979 (BBC One)
11	"The Magician's Assistant" "Simple Simon and the Mad Pieman"	May 21, 1979 (BBC One)
12	"The Frog" "The Hole Thing"	June 4, 1979 (BBC One)
13	"Beach Fun" "Ratman"	June 11, 1979 (BBC One)
14	"Bone of Contention" "Chicken Lady's Revenge"	June 18, 1979 (BBC One)
15	"A Lad's Lamp" "The Bulk"	June 25, 1979 (BBC One)
16	"Shanghaied" "Dr Sy Klops"	July 2, 1979 (BBC One)

== Cast ==
- Ruth Buzzi - Gladys
- Arte Johnson - Tyrone
