= Robert Brubaker =

American character actor (1916–2010)

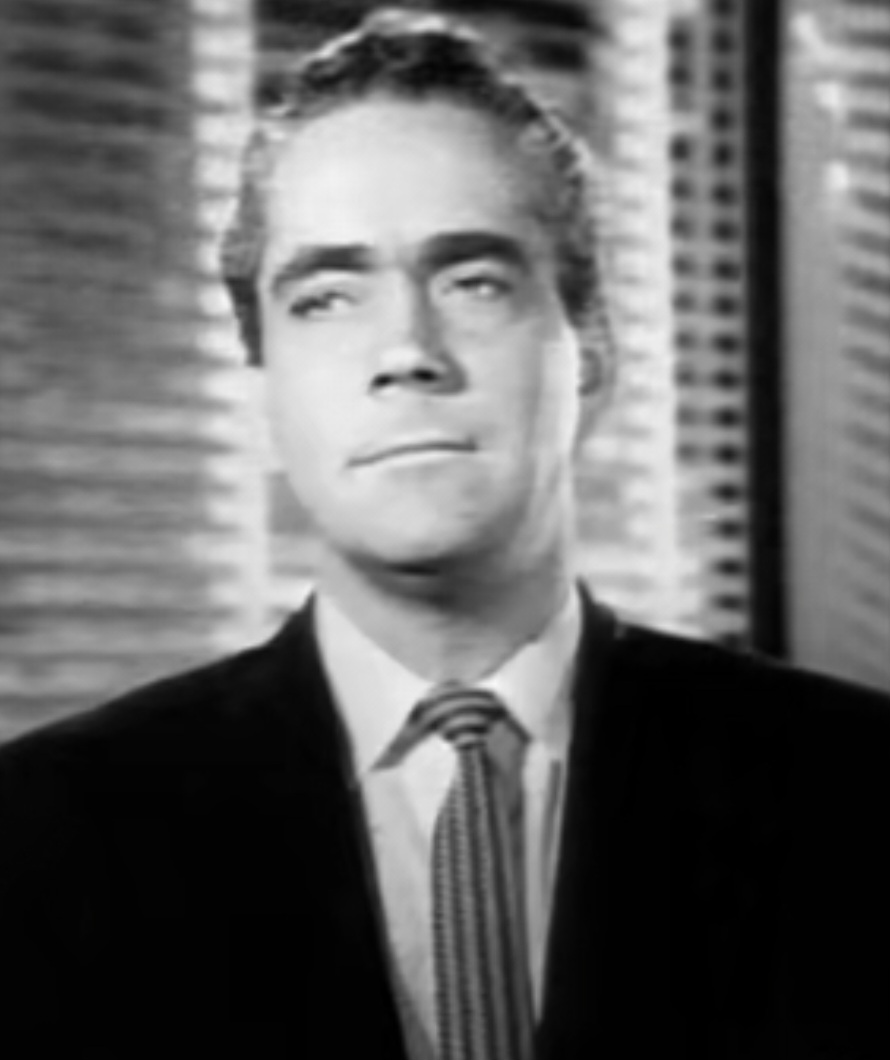
- Brubaker in an episode of The Public Defender (1955)
- Born: October 9, 1916; Robinson, Illinois, U.S.
- Died: April 15, 2010 (aged 93); Riverside, California, U.S.
- Resting place: Forest Lawn Memorial Park, Glendale, California
- Occupation: Actor
- Years active: 1936–1979

Robert Brubaker (October 9, 1916 – April 15, 2010) was an American character actor best known for his roles in television and movie Westerns, including Gunsmoke and 40 Guns to Apache Pass.

== Early years ==
Brubaker was born in Robinson, Illinois, on October 9, 1916, the son of George Brubaker. His interest in acting developed when he was a student at Robinson Township High School. He dropped out of Northwestern University after two years and went to New York.

== Military service ==
During World War II, Brubaker was an aircraft commander in the U.S. Army Air Force. Later, he served during the Berlin Airlift and during the Korean War he was a part of the Strategic Air Command.

== Career ==
Brubaker debuted as a professional actor in Oh Say Can You Sing, Dance or Act (1936), a production of the Federal Theatre Project. While he worked at radio station KMPC, Brubaker caught the attention of an executive of Paramount Pictures, and his film debut came in a bit part in Blonde Alibi (1946).

Brubaker portrayed a deputy in the syndicated television series U.S. Marshal. He was the only actor to have two recurring roles on the television series, Gunsmoke, portraying both a bartender named Floyd and a stagecoach driver named Jim Buck (often uncredited). Some of Brubaker's other credits included the Rock Hudson film, Seconds, and television crime dramas The Walter Winchell File and Perry Mason, and the television police drama The Asphalt Jungle.

== Later years ==
After he left acting, Brubaker worked for Forest Lawn Cemetery as a director in the training department. When he retired from that job, he moved to Lake Elsinore, California.

== Death ==
Brubaker died on April 15, 2010, at the age of 93 in Riverside, California. He was buried at Forest Lawn Memorial Park, Glendale, in Southern California.

== Partial filmography ==
- Blonde Alibi (1946) – Pedestrian (uncredited)
- The Court-Martial of Billy Mitchell (1955) – Major H. H. Arnold
- Pardners (1956) – Businessman (uncredited)
- The Girl He Left Behind (1956) – Colonel Thomas Murphy (uncredited)
- Written on the Wind (1956) – Hotel Manager (uncredited)
- The Book of Acts Series (1957) – Simon Peter
- The Walter Winchell File – "Act of Folly" – (1957) – Beckman
- Battle Hymn (1957) – Briefing Officer (uncredited)
- Mister Cory (1957) – Card Player (uncredited)
- Man of a Thousand Faces (1957) – Jack Conway, Director of 'Unholy Three' (uncredited)
- My Man Godfrey (1957) – Man with Monkey
- Decision – (1958) (TV) – season 1 episode 13 ("Man on a Raft") – Tim Rourke
- The Female Animal (1958) – Bartender (uncredited)
- The Gift of Love (1958) – State Trooper (uncredited)
- Official Detective – "Tinseled Alibi" – (1958) – Snyder
- The Walter Winchell File – "Portrait of A Cop" (1958) – Janis
- The Heart Is a Rebel (1958) – Dr. Chambers
- Wanted: Dead or Alive – (1959) (TV) – season 2 episode 12 ("Twelve Hours to Crazy Horse") – Warner
- The Walking Target (1960) – Brenner (uncredited)
- Moon Pilot (1962) – Space Flight Technician (uncredited)
- Seven Days in May (1964) – Gen. Diefenbach (uncredited)
- Apache Rifles (1964) – Sgt. Cobb
- Mirage (1965) – Bar Patron (uncredited)
- 40 Guns to Apache Pass (1966) – Sergeant Walker
- Seconds (1966) – Mayberry
- Airport (1970) – Dr. Nash (uncredited)
- The Brotherhood of the Bell (1970) – Bell Operative (uncredited)
- The Virginian (1970) (TV) – season 8 episode 23 (Rich Man, Poor Man) – Reardon
- Dragnet (1970) (TV) – Father of drug addict
- The Bus Is Coming (1971) – Chief Jackson
- The Sting (1973) – Bill Clayton from Pittsburgh (uncredited)
