= Nevin Dexter =

American politician

Member-elect of the New Hampshire House of Representatives from the Strafford 9th district
- Assuming office December 2026
- Succeeding: Amy Malone

Personal details
- Party: Democratic

Nevin Dexter is an American politician. A member of the Democratic Party, he is the member-elect for the Strafford 9th district of the New Hampshire House of Representatives.
