= Crash (1978 film) =

1978 American made-for-television film

- Directed by: Barry Shear
- Starring: William Shatner

Original release
- Network: ABC
- Release: October 29, 1978

Crash (also known as The Crash of Flight 401) is a made-for-TV drama film aired on the American Broadcasting Company (ABC) on October 29, 1978. It was directed by Barry Shear and based on the true story of the first crash of a wide-body aircraft, that of Eastern Air Lines Flight 401, a Lockheed L-1011 TriStar which crashed in the Florida Everglades near Miami on the night of December 29, 1972. The film more or less follows the true events of the crash, although the names of key characters were changed and certain dramatic events were fictionalized. The crash sequence was one of the most authentic (and expensive) for television of the time, using multiple stunts, pyrotechnics and flyaway set pieces.

The film stars William Shatner as maverick National Transportation Safety Board crash investigator Carl Tobias, who is called in to review the jetliner crash under pressure from his superiors to exonerate Lockheed of responsibility. Although the film implies that Lockheed was negligent in the design of the TriStar's flight control systems, it concludes by citing the NTSB's official determination that the crash was due to pilot error: the crew's failure to properly monitor the flight instruments during the last four minutes of flight. The crew was distracted by a blown light bulb in the landing gear position indicator display panel, which caused them not to notice that they had inadvertently disengaged the autopilot and put the TriStar into a slow, imperceptible descent. Eddie Albert portrayed the captain, and Lane Smith, in an early role, portrayed the hospitalized and barely alive surviving flight engineer who alerts Tobias to a computer "mismatch" in the autopilot. The cast also included Adrienne Barbeau and Sharon Gless, whose characters were based on the actual flight attendants tending to the passengers that fateful night. Lorraine Gary, Ed Nelson, Christopher Connelly, Laraine Stephens and Ron Glass played noteworthy passengers.

It was the second made-for-TV film based on the crash, following The Ghost of Flight 401 which aired on the National Broadcasting Company (NBC) in February 1978.

Reviewer James Brown of the Los Angeles Times called it "a well-crafted, professionally polished work that falls into the unfortunate trap of trying to tell too much in too little time -- ending up with some admirable vignettes but no clear, sustaining focus to link them together."

== Cast ==
- William Shatner - Carl Tobias
- Eddie Albert - Captain Dunn
- Adrienne Barbeau - Veronica Daniels
- Brooke Bundy - Camille Lawrence
- Christopher Connelly - Mike Tagliarino
- Lorraine Gary - Emily Mulwray
- Ron Glass - Jerry Grant
- Sharon Gless - Lesley Fuller
- Joyce Jameson - Sophie Cross
- George Maharis - Evan Walsh
- Ed Nelson - Philip Mulwray
- Gerald S. O'Loughlin - Larry Cross
- Joe Silver - Alvin Jessop
- Lane Smith - Flight Engineer Dominic Romano
- Laraine Stephens - Ginny Duffy
- Richard Yniguez - Osario

== Production credits ==
- Barry Shear - director
- Donald S. Sanford and Steve Brown - writers
- Edward J. Montagne - producer
- Chuck Fries and Malcolm Stewart - executive producers
