= Jim Truscott =

Australian businessman (1956–2021)

- Born: 26 May 1956
- Died: 28 April 2021 (aged 64)
- Education: Bachelor of Civil Engineering, Bachelor of Arts
- Alma mater: University of New South Wales
- Occupations: Businessman; Officer
- Honours: Medal of the Order of Australia

James Francis Truscott OAM (26 May 1956 – 28 April 2021) was an Australian businessman and SAS officer. In 2001 he started Truscott Crisis Leaders, which in 2018 was sold to Mettle Group. He died on 28 April 2021, during an outback bicycle ride in Mungo National Park.

== Military service ==
Truscott was in the Australian Army from 1975 to 2001, during which he held six command appointments in operational Army units and three staff positions in joint headquarters. His last appointment was as Operations and Plans Officer in the Australian Special Air Service Regiment in Perth.

In the 1989 Australia Day Honours Truscott received the Medal of the Order of Australia for his "service to mountaineering, particularly the Australia Bicentennial Everest Expedition".

== Published works ==
- 'Taipan', 2007. Celebrating 100 Years of Defending the Low Ground and Swamps. Rendezvous, September.pp. 28–31. ISBN 1921036982 / ISBN 9781921036989
- Truscott, J., 2007. Climbing in Western Australia. Rendezvous, September.pp. 222–226.ISBN 1921036982 / ISBN 9781921036989
- Birkett, D., Truscott, J., Mala-Jetmarova, H. & Barton, A., 2011. Vulnerability of Water and Wastewater Infrastructure and its Protection from Acts of Terrorism: A Business Perspective. In: Handbook of Water and Wastewater Systems Protection. New York: Springer. ISBN 978-1-4614-0188-9
- Truscott, J., 2012. Dancing With The Tiger: The Art of Business Crisis Leadership. Chicago: MissionMode Solutions Press. ISBN 978-0-615-65511-6
- Truscott, J., 2015. Snakes in the Jungle, Special Operations in War and Business. Mermaid Waters: Zeus Publications ISBN 1922229962
