= John West (theatre) =

John West AM
- Born: 7 March 1924; Paddington, New South Wales, Australia
- Died: 9 July 2008 (aged 84); Collaroy, New South Wales, Australia
- Education: Fort Street High School
- Occupations: Radio announcer, theatre historian
- Years active: 1942–1989
- Known for: The Showman, Sentimental Journey

John West AM (7 March 1924 – 9 July 2008) was an Australian broadcaster and theatre historian remembered for his long-running programmes "Sentimental Journey" and "The Showman" broadcast nationally on ABC Radio.

== Early life ==
He was born in Paddington, Sydney, and grew up in Concord, the only child of John and Jean West. He was brought up by his mother and developed an early interest in theatre, which was encouraged by his grandmother, Mary Bell.

He was educated at Fort Street High School.

== Career ==
He joined the ABC as an announcer in 1942 before enlisting in the Royal Australian Air Force, serving with RAAF Radio "The Voice of the Islands" from 1942 to 1945.

He returned to the ABC as an ordinary announcer, pursuing his theatrical interests at every opportunity in his off-duty time until 1964 when he was able to combine his profession and passion in the weekly programme "The Showman". A second program, "Sentimental Journey" in which he resurrected old gramophone records from the ABC's record library, as well as his own and those of fellow enthusiasts, followed in 1978. Both continued after he "officially" retired in 1989.

West was made a Member of the Order of Australia (AM) in the 1989 Australia Day Honours for "service to media and the arts".

== Death ==
His last years were blighted by dementia, cared for by one-time colleague Nona Wood. He had been diagnosed with a brain tumor but died in a nursing home at Collaroy following a heart attack.

== Programmes ==
- Sentimental Journey on Saturday nights (1978–95)
- The Showman (1964–90)

== Publications ==
- Theatre in Australia Cassell Australia 1978 ISBN 0-7269-9266-6
