= Laraine Stephens =

American actress (born 1941)

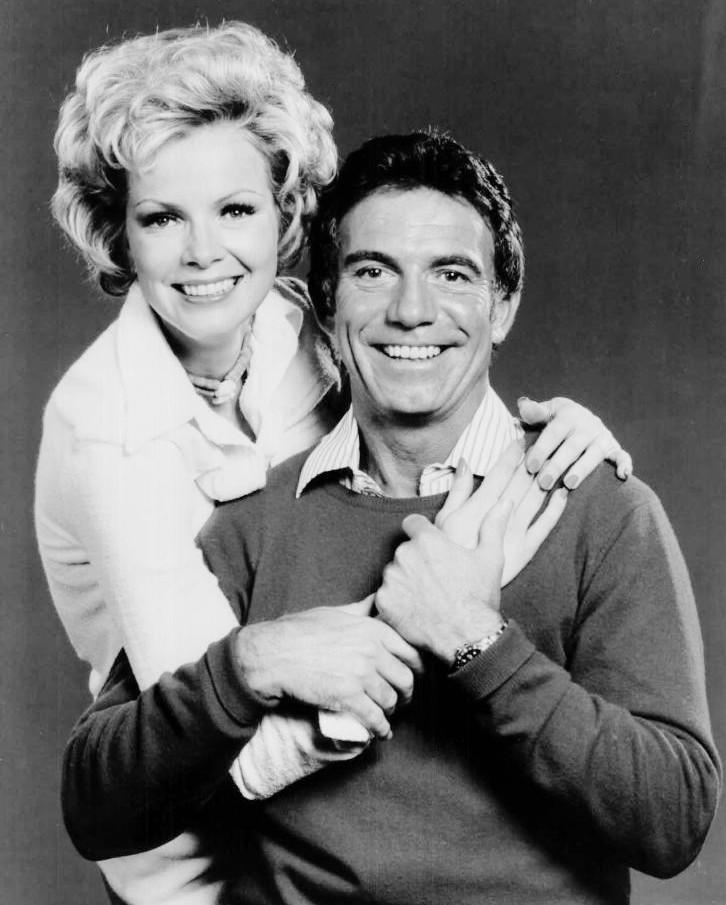
- Stephens and Tony Franciosa in a publicity photo for the Matt Helm TV series
- Born: July 24, 1941 (age 85); Oakland, California
- Years active: 1961-1983
- Spouse: David Gerber (m. 1970; died 2010)

Laraine Stephens (born July 24, 1941) is a retired American actress.

== Career ==
Stephens was born in Oakland, California. She studied at both Los Angeles City College and the University of California, Los Angeles.

A coloratura soprano, Stephens performed in operas before moving into acting.

On television, Stephens played Diane Waring in Bracken's World, Irene Stefan in Eischied, Claire Kronski in Matt Helm, Susan Wentworth in O.K. Crackerby!, Claire Estep in Rich Man, Poor Man Book II, and Dr. Karen Fletcher in Women in White.

She also appeared in the TV series Leave It to Beaver, Surfside 6, The Many Loves of Dobie Gillis, Laramie, Laredo, The F.B.I., Tarzan, The Name of the Game, I Dream of Jeannie, Love, American Style, Nanny and the Professor, Cade's County, The Mod Squad, Marcus Welby, M.D., Mission: Impossible, Mannix, McCloud, Barnaby Jones, Cannon, Movin' On, The Quest, Police Story, Police Woman, Hawaii Five-O, The Next Step Beyond, Vegas, The Love Boat, T. J. Hooker, Seven Brides for Seven Brothers and Fantasy Island, among others. She appeared in the films 40 Guns to Apache Pass; Hellfighters; and The Thousand Plane Raid; and in numerous television movies.

In 1964, Sinatra Enterprises signed Stephens for a role in the film None but the Brave.

She retired with an episode of Fantasy Island, airing on January 29, 1983, her last acting credit.

== Personal life ==
On June 12, 1970, Stephens married producer David Gerber. The couple operated Gerber Vineyards.

== Selected TV and filmography ==
=== TV series - guest appearances ===
- Leave It to Beaver (November 25, 1961) (Season 5 Episode 8 : "Wally's big Date") as Gail Preston
- Surfside 6 (May 14, 1962) (Season 2 Episode 34 : "Squeeze Play") as Lydia Wilder
- The Many Loves of Dobie Gillis (October 17, 1962) (Season 4 Episode 4 : "The Ugliest American") as Clydene Quigley
- Laramie (May 7, 1963) (Season 4 Episode 30: "Badge of Glory") as Laurie Adams
- Laredo (1966)
  - (Season 1 Episode 17: "Above the Law") (January 13, 1966) as Ruth Phelps
  - (Season 1 Episode 28: "Sound of Terror") (April 7, 1966) as Barbara Halsey
- The Fisher Family (1967)
- Mannix (1967-1973)
  - (Season 1 Episode 10: "Coffin for a Clown") (November 25, 1967) as Helen Brewer
  - (Season 6 Episode 3: "The Crimson Halo") (October 1, 1972) as Charlene Tallifer
  - (Season 7 Episode 9: "Sing a Song of Murder") (November 11, 1973) as Angela Talbot
- The Christophers (TV series) (January 7, 1968) ("The Bilford") as Nancy
- The FBI (February 18, 1968) (Season 3 Episode 19: "The Phone Call") as Margaret Campbell
- Tarzan (March 15, 1968) (Season 2 Episode 24: "Rendezvous for Revenge") as Doria
- The Name of the Game (October 18, 1968) (Season 1 Episode 5: "Nightmare") as Lorraine Farrell
- I Dream of Jeannie (October 14, 1969) (Season 5 Episode 5: "Jeannie's Beauty Cream") as Amanda
- Hawaii Five-O (1970-1978)
  - (Season 3 Episode 12: "Beautiful Screamer") (December 2, 1970) as Sally Gregson
  - (Season 5 Episode 1: "Death Is a Company Policy") (September 12, 1972) as Miss Simpson
  - (Season 10 Episode 23: "A Stranger in His Grave") (April 27, 1978) as Katie Kealoha
- Love, American Style (February 12, 1971) (Season 2 Episode 20: "Love and the Baker's half Dozen") as Joan
- Nanny and the Professor (September 20, 1971) (Season 3 Episode 2: "The Flower Children") as Marjorie Meyers
- Cade's County (October 3, 1971) (Season 1 Episode 3: "Safe Deposit") as Allison Burton
- The Mod Squad (November 2, 1971) (Season 2 Episode 24: "The Poisoned Mind") as Laurie Childs
- Marcus Welby, M.D. (November 9, 1971) (Season 3 Episode 10: "Echo from Another World") as Kay Powers
- The Man and the City (December 1, 1971) (Season 1 Episode 11: "Cross Country Man")
- Mission: Impossible (January 12, 1973) (Season 7 Episode 15: "Boomerang") as Eve Vayle
- Police Story (1973 TV series) (1973-1977)
  - (Season 1 Episode 7: "Death on Credit") (November 27, 1973) as Patti
  - (Season 1 Episode 12: "Countdown: Part 1") (January 15, 1974) as Jenny LaFrieda
  - (Season 1 Episode 13: "Countdown: Part 2") (January 22, 1974) as Jenny LaFrieda
  - (Season 2 Episode 14: "Year o the Dragon: Part 1") (January 21, 1975) as Laura Darrin
  - (Season 2 Episode 15: "Year o the Dragon: Part 2") (January 28, 1975) as Laura Darrin
  - (Season 5 Episode 2: "Stigma") (November 9, 1977) as Lynn Lewis
- Barnaby Jones (1973-1974)
  - (Season 2 Episode 13: "Secret of the Dunes") (December 19, 1973) as Sheila Windsor
  - (Season 3 Episode 1: "A Gathering of Thieves") (September 10, 74) as Irene Hopkins
- McCloud (TV series) (March 24, 1974) (Season 4 Episode 5: "This must be the Alamo") as Shannon Taylor
- Police Woman (TV series) (1974-1977)
  - (Season 1 Episode 8: "Flowers of Evil") (November 8, 1974) as Gladys Conway
  - (Season 1 Episode 16: "Blast") (January 24, 1975) as Christina Littel
  - (Season 3 Episode 14: "Banker's Hours") (January 18, 1977) as Karen Osborne
  - (Season 4 Episode 11: "Tigress") (January 11, 1978) as Amelia Boyer
- Cannon (October 2, 1974) (Season 4 Episode 4: "Lady in Red") as Evelyn Rogers
- Movin' On (November 7, 1974) (Season 1 Episode 7: "The Good Life") as Joan
- The Quest (November 10, 1976) (Season 1 Episode 6) as Seba Alcott
- Gibbsville (TV series) (1977) (Season 1 Episode 10)
- The Next Step Beyond (1977) (Season 1 Episode 1: "Tsunami") as Cathy Terence
- Fantasy Island (1979-1983)
  - (Season 2 Episode 17: "The Stripper/The Boxer") (February 10, 1979) as Maureen Banning
  - (Season 4 Episode 18: "The Searcher/The Way We Weren't") (March 7, 1981) as Dorothy"Dottie" Cooper
  - (Season 5 Episode 15: "The case Agains't Mr. Roarke/Save Sherlock Holmes") (February 6, 1982) as Fran Warner
  - (Season 6 Episode 12: "The Tallowed Image/Room and Bard") (January 29, 1983) as Angela Marckham
- Vegas (1978 TV series) (September 19, 1979) (Season 2 Episode 1: "Redhanded") as Merrill Wayne
- The Love Boat (January 3, 1981) (Season 1 Episode 6: "Captive Audience") as Susan Braddock
- Today's F.B.I. (December 27, 1981) (Season 1 Episode 8: "Skyjack") as Marion
- McClain's Law (January 8, 1982) (Season 1 Episode 6: "To Save the Queen") as Anne Wilson
- T.J. Hooker (December 4, 1982) (Season 2 Episode 10: "Thieves' Highway") as Commissioner Cook
- Seven Brides for Seven Brothers (TV series) (December 8, 1982) (Season 1 Episode 11: "Neighbors") as Sophie Barton

=== Television series regular roles ===
- O.K. Crackerby! (1965–1966) (13 episodes) as Susan Wentworth (recurring role)
- Bracken's World (1969–1970) (29 episodes) as Diane Waring
- Matt Helm (1975–1976) (13 episodes) as Claire Kronski
- Rich Man, Poor Man Book II (1976–1977) (10 episodes) as Claire Estep (recurring role)
- Eischied (1979–1980) (6 episodes) as Irene Stefan (recurring role)

=== TV movie appearances ===
- The Movie Maker (1964) as Young Paula Kirsch
- The Screaming Woman (1972) as Caroline Wynant
- Adventures of Nick Carter (1972) as Joyce Jordan (unsold pilot)
- Jarrett (1973) as Sigrid Larsen (unsold pilot)
- The Girl on the Late, Late Show (1974) as Paula
- Matt Helm (1975) as Kronski (TV Movie pilot for series)
- The Rangers (1974) as Edie
- Risko (1976) as Susan Grainger (unsold pilot )
- The Courage and the Passion (1978) as Brett Gardener
- Crash (1978) as Ginny Duffy
- Dallas Cowboys Cheerleaders (1979) as Suzanne Mitchell
- Women in White (1979) as Dr Karen Fletcher (4-hour Tv movie intended as a pilot for a series which didn't sold]
- Dallas Cowboys Cheerleaders II (1980) as Suzanne Mitchell
- Power (1980) as Norma Greer
- Scruples (1980) as Eliza (unsold pilot)

=== Film appearances ===
- None But the Brave (1965) as Lorie, Dennis's fiancée (uncredited)
- 40 Guns to Apache Pass (1967) as Ellen Malone
- Hellfighters (1968) as Helen Meadows
- The Thousand Plane Raid (1969) as WAC Lieutenant Gabrielle "Gabby" Ames
