= Ed Malone =

Ed Malone may refer to:

- Ed Malone, character in King of the Lost World
- Ed Malone, see Oakville municipal election, 2003
- Ed Malone, fictional character, see List of Coronation Street characters
- Ed Malone, fictional character in Growing Pains

== See also ==
- Edward Malone (disambiguation)
- Ted Malone (disambiguation)
- Edmond Malone (1741–1812), Shakespearian scholar
- Edwin Malone
