= The Thousand Plane Raid =

1969 film by Boris Sagal

- Theatrical release poster
- Directed by: Boris Sagal
- Written by: Donald S. Sanford (screenplay); Robert Vincent Wright (story)
- Based on: The 1965 book The Thousand Plane Raid by Ralph Barker
- Starring: Christopher George; Laraine Stephens; J. D. Cannon; Gary Marshal
- Cinematography: William W. Spencer
- Edited by: Henry Batista; Jodie Copelan
- Music by: Jimmie Haskell
- Production company: Oakmont Productions
- Distributed by: United Artists
- Release date: July 1969
- Running time: 93 minutes
- Country: United States
- Language: English

The Thousand Plane Raid (also known as The One Thousand Plane Raid) is a 1969 DeLuxe Color film directed by Boris Sagal and starring Christopher George and Laraine Stephens. Although claimed to be derived from Ralph Barker's The Thousand Plane Raid (also published as The Thousand Plan: the Story of the First Thousand Bomber Raids on Cologne), the storyline of the film inaccurately portrays the first raid as an 8th Air Force mission while the actual attack was undertaken by 1,047 Royal Air Force bombers against the city of Cologne, Germany in May 1942.

== Plot ==
In 1943, Colonel Greg Brandon (Christopher George), stationed at a United States Army Air Forces 8th Air Force, 103rd Bomb Group base in England, attempts to persuade superiors that a massive, co-ordinated daylight bombing raid will hasten the end of World War II. In spite of the mission's extreme difficulty and risk, his plan is eventually put into effect against a vital enemy aircraft factory in central Germany.

Brandon has never been popular with his men, many of whom feel he drives them too hard. During preparation for the raid, Brandon alienates them further by insisting that they step up their training. He has disdain for cautious young flyer Lieutenant Archer (Ben Murphy), whom he suspects of being a coward. An RAF Wing Commander Trafton Howard (Gary Marshal) has been assigned to Brandon's base to teach the squadron combat tactics. Brandon starts out resenting Howard's brash manner, and things get worse between them when Howard takes Archer on an unauthorized flying lesson. As the date draws closer Brandon further antagonizes his associates, as well as his girlfriend, WAC Lieutenant Gabrielle Ames (Laraine Stephens).

The raid's prospects seem dim when it is revealed that the Germans know some, and possibly all, of its important details. Nevertheless, it is scheduled to go ahead as planned. On the morning of the mission Brandon's plane crashes, and Brandon is forced to board a bomber manned by Archer and Howard. During the raid, in combat over the target area, Brandon is impressed by Archer's piloting skills and Howard's judgment. On their return to base Brandon is told that the raid's target has been totally destroyed, and that allied losses were considerably less than anticipated.

== Cast ==
- Christopher George as Colonel Greg Brandon
- Laraine Stephens as Lieutenant Gabrielle "Gabby" Ames
- J. D. Cannon as General Cotten Palmer
- Gary Marshal as Wing Commander "Taffy" Howard
- Barry Atwater as General Conway
- Michael Evans as Group Commander Leslie Hardwicke
- Gavin MacLeod as Sergeant Kruger
- Noam Pitlik as Lieutenant Jacoby
- Ben Murphy as Lieutenant Harvey Archer
- Bo Hopkins as Captain Douglass (in his screen debut)
- Tim McIntire as Lieutenant Quimby
- Scott Thomas as Lieutenant Richman
- John Carter as Middleton
- James Gammon as Major Varga
- Charles Dierkop as Railla
- Henry Jaglom as Worchek

== Production ==
The film was based on Ralph Baker's book of the same name which was published in 1966.

The film was made for the Mirisch Corporation. Shooting started January 16, 1968. The Mirisch Corporation signed George to a five-picture contract.

The film was shot in a budget-conscious manner. The main sets were in Santa Maria, California, and principal photography took place in winter 1968. The local village and airport realistically portrayed a typical British wartime base. Period-style maintenance shops, an operations center and a wartime-style control tower were added to re-create the fictional Steeple Bassington base. Additional studio work was completed at the Samuel Goldwyn Studios in Hollywood.

Aerial sequences included a mix of stock wartime footage, including the Memphis Belle: A Story of a Flying Fortress (1944), some of it colorized to match original footage. The air-boss was legendary Hollywood stunt pilot Frank Tallman, but the most spectacular scene was a low-flying B-17 scene flown by Don Lykins. Another crash scene was taken from Twelve O'Clock High, the famous crash-landing carried out by Paul Mantz, another of Hollywood's leading stunt pilots, and Tallman's one-time partner in Tallmantz Aviation, before his death in 1965. Three Boeing B-17 Flying Fortress bombers (DB-17P 44-83684 [N3713G] from The Air Museum at Ontario, California, DB-17P 44-83525 [N83525], from Tallmantz Aviation at Santa Ana, California, and B-17F 42-29782 [N17W]) from Aircraft Specialties at Mesa, Arizona, were used in the production.

== Reception ==
Critical reviews commented on the "stereotyped adventure yarn" aspect of the production while noting that the aerial footage was often exciting.

The film was not a success at the box office.

== See also ==
- Thousand-bomber raids
- List of American films of 1969
