= Dallas Cowboys Cheerleaders (1979 film) =

1979 American comedy-drama television film

- Based on: Dallas Cowboys Cheerleaders
- Written by: Robert Hamner
- Directed by: Bruce Bilson
- Starring: Jane Seymour; Laraine Stephens; Bert Convy
- Music by: Jimmie Haskell
- Country of origin: United States
- Original language: English

Production
- Producers: James T. Aubrey; Bruce Bilson; Robert Hamner; Jack Leewood
- Cinematography: Donald H. Birnkrant
- Editor: Ira Heymann
- Running time: 98 minutes

Original release
- Network: ABC
- Release: January 14, 1979

Dallas Cowboys Cheerleaders is an American comedy-drama television film about the Dallas Cowboys Cheerleaders directed by Bruce Bilson and starring Jane Seymour, Laraine Stephens, and Bert Convy.

== Premise ==
Newspaper editor Lyman Spencer (Bert Convy) decides to send his girlfriend, Laura Cole (Jane Seymour), who is also a reporter on the paper, undercover to try out for the Dallas Cowboys Cheerleaders in order to do an insider's story on the squeaky-clean sideline dancers.

== Release and reception ==
The film was released on January 14, 1979, a week before the Dallas Cowboys played in the Super Bowl XIII, receiving a 48% share of the national television audience.

== Cast ==
- Jane Seymour as Laura Cole
- Laraine Stephens as Suzanne Mitchell
- Bert Convy as Lyman Spencer
- Bucky Dent as Kyle Jessop
- Pamela Susan Shoop as Betty Denton
- Ellen Bry as Joanne Vail
- Jenifer Shaw as Kim Everly
- Kathrine Baumann as Ginny O'Neil
- Lauren Tewes as Jessie Matthews
- Texie Waterman as Herself
- Ron Chapman as Himself
- Irma P. Hall as Dora
- Jim Beaver as Cowboy Player
- Gil Brandt as Himself

== See also ==
- Dallas Cowboys Cheerleaders II
