= Arte Johnson =

American comic actor (1929–2019)

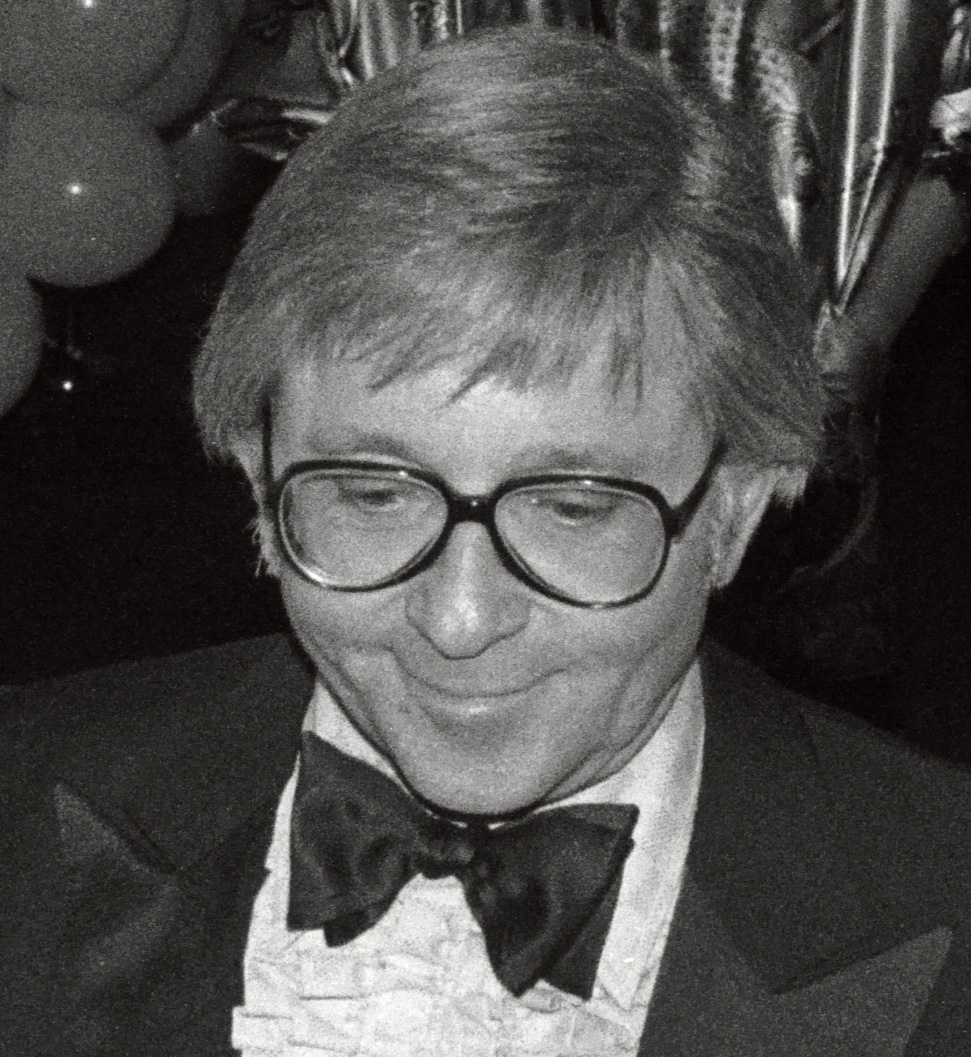
- Johnson at the premiere of Seems Like Old Times in December 1980
- Born: Arthur Stanton Eric Johnson; January 20, 1929; Benton Harbor, Michigan, U.S.
- Died: July 3, 2019 (aged 90); Los Angeles, California, U.S.
- Education: University of Illinois (B.A., 1949)
- Occupations: Actor; comedian
- Years active: 1952–2005
- Spouses: Texie Waterman (divorced); Gisela Johnson (m. 1968)

Arthur Stanton Eric "Arte" (/ˈɑːrti/ AR-tee) Johnson (January 20, 1929 – July 3, 2019) was an American actor and comedian, who was best known for his work as a regular, portraying himself, in the NBC sketch comedy series Rowan & Martin's Laugh-In (1967–1971).

== Biography ==
=== Early life ===
Johnson was born January 20, 1929, in Benton Harbor, Michigan, the son of Abraham Lincoln and Edythe Mackenzie (Goldberg/Golden) Johnson. His father was an attorney. Johnson graduated from Austin High School and received a bachelor's degree in radio journalism from University of Illinois Urbana-Champaign in 1949, where he worked at the campus radio station and the University of Illinois Theater Guild with his brother Coslough "Cos" Johnson.

Following brief military service in Korea (he was discharged due to a duodenal ulcer he had suffered since childhood), he sought employment in Chicago advertising agencies but was unsuccessful and left for New York City to work for Viking Press. In early 1954, Johnson performed in several New York nightclubs, including Le Ruban Bleu and the Village Vanguard. His first job in show business came when he impulsively stepped into an audition line and was cast in Gentlemen Prefer Blondes. Johnson appeared in Ben Bagley's The Shoestring Revue, which opened off-Broadway on February 28, 1955, at the President Theater in New York.

At first he was billed as Art E. Johnson, but as he related, "[O]ne day a printer messed it up and it came out Arte, and I liked it."

=== Early television and film roles ===
Johnson appeared three times in the 1955–1956 CBS sitcom It's Always Jan, starring Janis Paige and Merry Anders. In 1956 a young Arte Johnson appeared in season 3, episode 22, of Make Room for Daddy in an episode called "Who Can Figure Kids", where he sang and danced. In 1958 he joined the cast of the short-lived NBC sitcom Sally. On that program he played Bascomb Bleacher, Jr., the son of a co-owner of a department store, portrayed by Gale Gordon. He played Ariel Lavalerra in the 1960 film The Subterraneans, an adaptation of Jack Kerouac's 1958 novel of the same name. In 1960 and 1961, he appeared in three episodes of Jackie Cooper's military sitcom/drama series Hennesey, also on CBS. In Alfred Hitchcock Presents he played Mr. Bates in the episode "A Secret Life" (1962). He was cast in an episode of Frank Aletter's sitcom Bringing Up Buddy. He also appeared in an episode of The Twilight Zone titled "The Whole Truth" (1961).

Before his big breakthrough in Laugh-In, Johnson was cast for a guest role as Corporal Coogan in the anthology series GE True ("The Handmade Private," 1962). He played a bumbling navy cameraman on an episode of McHale's Navy in the first season and The Andy Griffith Show as a hotel clerk in the episode "Andy and Barney in the Big City" (also 1962). He was a member of the regular cast of the 1962–1963 situation comedy Don't Call Me Charlie!, portraying Corporal Lefkowitz. Johnson appeared in a comedic role as Charlie, a boom-microphone operator who demonstrates to Jack Benny how to tell a joke properly, on The Jack Benny Program that aired on October 2, 1964. The joke performed in the sketch was the "ugly baby" story, later associated with Flip Wilson. He made a guest appearance on ABC's sitcom, Bewitched as Samantha's (Elizabeth Montgomery) Cousin Edgar in the final episode of the first season, airing on June 2, 1965. Also in 1965, Johnson played a rare dramatic supporting role in the film The Third Day as Lester Aldrich, who turns out to be the downtrodden husband of the sleazy nymphomaniac Holly.

Johnson appeared in one of the final episodes of ABC's The Donna Reed Show in 1966. He was cast in the satirical James Coburn film The President's Analyst (1967), in which he gave a comically chilling performance as a federal agent with a blindly obedient "orders are orders" mentality. He appeared in the Season 3 episode of Lost in Space titled "Princess of Space" (1968). Johnson also starred in an episode of Rod Serling's Night Gallery titled "The Flip-Side of Satan" (1971).

=== Laugh-In ===
Johnson is best known for his work on Rowan & Martin's Laugh-In from 1968 to 1973, on which he played many characters, including "Wolfgang," a cigarette-smoking German soldier oblivious to the fact that World War II was long over, as he skulked while hidden behind a potted plant. He would then invariably comment on a preceding gag with the catchphrase "Very interesting ...," which Johnson claimed was inspired by a Nazi character who spoke the line during an interrogation scene in the film Desperate Journey (1942). Often toward the show's close, he (as the German) would offer words of affection to "Lucy and Gary" (Lucille Ball and her second husband Gary Morton). The Lucy Show and later Here's Lucy on CBS were in direct competition with NBC's Laugh-In on Monday night. Johnson reprised the role briefly on Sesame Street in the early 1970s, and while voicing the Nazi-inspired character Virman Vundabar on an episode of Justice League Unlimited.

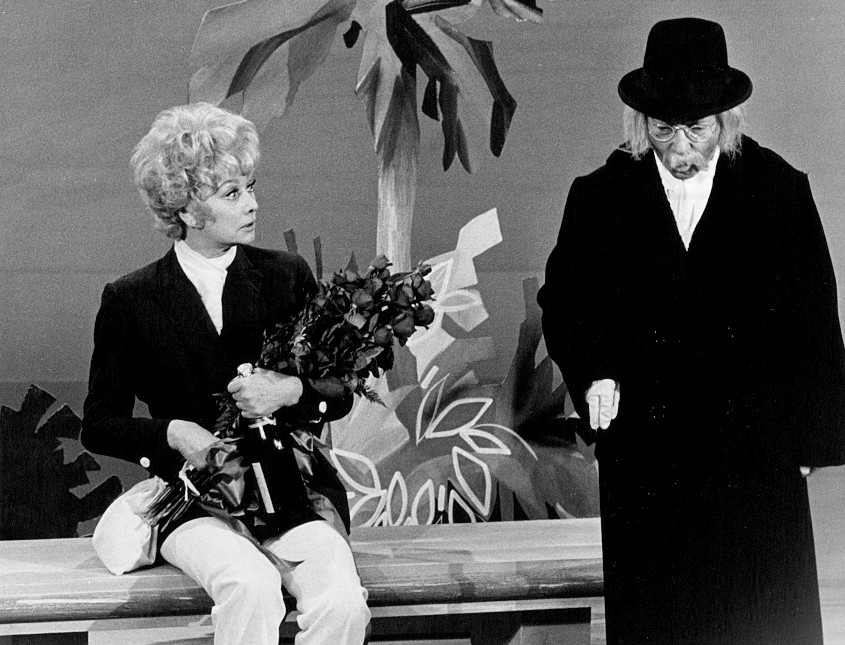
Johnson as "Tyrone F. Horneigh" approaching Lucille Ball in a sketch on The Glen Campbell Goodtime Hour (1971)

His other prominent Laugh-In character was "Tyrone F. Horneigh" (pronounced "horn-eye," a "clean" variant of the vulgar term "horny"), the white-haired, trench coat-wearing "dirty old man" who repeatedly sought to seduce "Gladys Ormphby," (Ruth Buzzi's brown-clad "spinster" character) on a park bench. Tyrone would enter the scene, muttering a song (usually "In the Merry, Merry Month of May"), and, spying Gladys on the bench, would sit next to her. He would ask her a question, and regardless of the answer, turn it into a double entendre. She would then start hitting him with her purse and he would fall off the bench, sometimes with a plea for help.

To boost ratings in the third season, Tyrone courted Gladys in an on-air wedding storyline on the March 16, 1970, episode, with Henry Gibson appearing as the officiating parson and Tiny Tim and Carol Channing joining the festivities. Alas, both bride-to-be and groom-to-be walk out of the church just before the wedding vows are spoken.

Years after Laugh-In ended, the two characters were the subject of an animated Saturday-morning children's show, Baggy Pants and the Nitwits, with Tyrone as a helpful, muttering "superhero."

Johnson and his brother Coslough earned Emmy Awards while working on Laugh-In.

=== Later work ===
Johnson guest-starred in two episodes of The Partridge Family ("My Heart Belongs to a Two Car Garage" and "For Whom the Bell Tolls... and Tolls... and Tolls") and the situation comedy A Touch of Grace (1973). He appeared in the first season of the Detroit-produced children's show Hot Fudge (1974) and, for one week, as a celebrity guest panelist on the game show Match Game. From 1976 to 1980, Johnson was a regular celebrity guest judge on The Gong Show.

In 1976, Johnson voiced the animated cartoon character Misterjaw, a blue, German-accented shark, in The Pink Panther Show. He also voiced the character "Rhubarb" on The Houndcats and appeared as a guest on Canadian TV show Celebrity Cooks (1976) with host Bruno Gerussi. Johnson appeared on an episode of the NBC daytime version of Wheel of Fortune in September 1977 as a substitute letter-turner, both to fill in for an injured Susan Stafford, and to promote his short-lived NBC game show Knockout, which aired through early 1978. Instead of being introduced by the show's announcer, he would start the show with a small monologue, then the announcer would introduce the day's contestants. He was cast as Renfield, the comic sidekick of George Hamilton's Dracula in the film Love at First Bite (1979) and appeared in the all-star television disaster film Condominium (1980). He voiced "Weerd" in The 13 Ghosts of Scooby-Doo (1985), and played a disgruntled employee denied severance pay in an episode of Airwolf. He also voiced several other characters: Dr. Ludwig Von Strangebuck and Count Ray on two episodes of DuckTales; Devil Smurf on The Smurfs; Top Cat and Lou on Yo Yogi!; and Newt on Animaniacs. Johnson guest-starred in the Murder, She Wrote episode "No Laughing Murder" (1987). He also appeared in an episode of Night Court (1990). From 1991 to 1992, Johnson appeared in multiple episodes of General Hospital as Finian O'Toole. He played the old laboratory head of a team of scientists working on a serum of youth in Second Chance (1996).

Johnson performed more than 80 audiobook readings, including Gary Shteyngart's Absurdistan (2006) and Carl Hiaasen's Bad Monkey. He appeared in the Justice League Unlimited episode "The Ties That Bind" (2005) as the voice of Virman Vundabar, which was his final acting role before his retirement in 2005.

== Personal life ==
Johnson lived in Southern California with his wife, Gisela. They had four children: Antonia, Joanna, Danny, and Dae. He was previously married to choreographer Texie Waterman.

== Health problems and death ==
Johnson was a non-Hodgkin's lymphoma survivor, which was diagnosed and successfully treated in 1997. Johnson died at his home in Los Angeles, on July 3, 2019, just three years after being diagnosed with bladder and prostate cancers. He was 90. His ashes were scattered off Hawaii. Gisela Johnson survives him.

== Filmography ==
=== Film ===
| Year | Title | Role | Notes |
|---|---|---|---|
| 1956 | Miracle in the Rain | Monty | |
| 1959 | The Wild and the Innocent | Barker | Uncredited |
| 1960 | The Subterraneans | Arial Lavalerra | |
| 1965 | The Third Day | Lester Aldrich | |
| 1965 | That Funny Feeling | Paul | |
| 1967 | The President's Analyst | Sullivan | |
| 1968 | P.J. | Jackie | |
| 1977 | Charge of the Model T's | Doc Bailey | |
| 1979 | Love At First Bite | Renfield | |
| 1983 | Making of a Male Model | Marty Sampson | |
| 1984 | Cannonball Run II | Pilot | |
| 1985 | What Comes Around | Malone | |
| 1985 | Alice in Wonderland | The Dormouse | |
| 1988 | A Night at the Magic Castle | Harry Houdini | |
| 1989 | Tax Season | Mr. Goldberg | |
| 1990 | Evil Spirits | Lester Potts | |
| 1992 | Evil Toons | Mr. Hinchlow | |
| 1992 | Munchie | Professor Cruikshank | |
| 1995 | Captiva Island | Witherspoon, Ernie | |
| 1998 | The Modern Adventures of Tom Sawyer | Grumpy Old Man | Final film role |

=== Television ===
| Year | Title | Role | Notes |
|---|---|---|---|
| 1954 | Max Liebman Spectaculars | Chuck Green | Episode: "Best Foot Forward" |
| 1955–1956 | It's Always Jan | Stanley Schreiber | 4 episodes |
| 1956 | The Danny Thomas Show | Bob Martin | Episode: "Who Can Figure Kids?" |
| 1958 | Sally | Bascomb Bleacher Jr. | 7 episodes |
| 1959 | Schlitz Playhouse of Stars | Wally | Episode: "Ivy League" |
| 1960 | The Red Skelton Show | Joe, Census Taker | 2 episodes |
| 1960–1961 | Hennesey | Seaman Seymour Shatz | 3 episodes |
| 1961 | Alfred Hitchcock Presents | Mr. Bates, the Private Investigator | Season 6 Episode 33: "A Secret Life" |
| 1961 | The Twilight Zone | Irv | Episode: "The Whole Truth" |
| 1961 | Westinghouse Playhouse | Clerk | Episode: "Nan Suits Dan" |
| 1961 | Frontier Circus | Charles Gippner | Episode: "Journey from Hannibal" |
| 1961 | 87th Precinct | Hotel Clerk | Episode: "The Very Hard Sell" |
| 1962 | The Bob Newhart Show | Himself | 1 episode |
| 1962 | Dr. Kildare | Bud Fowler | Episode: "The Glory Hunter" |
| 1962 | The Andy Griffith Show | Hotel Clerk | Episode: "Andy and Barney in the Big City" |
| 1962 | GE True | Corporal Coogan | Episode: "The Handmade Private" |
| 1962–1963 | Don't Call Me Charlie! | Corporal Lefkowitz | 18 episodes |
| 1963 | McHale's Navy | Sweeney | Episode: "Camera, Action, Panic" |
| 1964 | The Greatest Show on Earth | Mario | Episode: "Man in a Hole" |
| 1964 | Destry | Lester | Episode: "Deputy for a Day" |
| 1964 | The Jack Benny Program | Charlie | Episode: "The Lucille Ball Show" |
| 1964 | Bob Hope Presents the Chrysler Theatre | Beatnik, Chip Broadwater | 2 episodes |
| 1964 | Many Happy Returns | Virgil Slamm | Episode: "Krockmeyer on Avon" |
| 1965 | Broadside | Charlie | Episode: "The Stowawaves" |
| 1965 | The Cara Williams Show | Fenwick Jr. | Episode: "Fletcher Succeeds in Business Without Really Trying" |
| 1965 | Bewitched | Cousin Edgar | Episode: "Cousin Edgar" |
| 1966 | The Dick Van Dyke Show | Bill Schermerhorn | Episode: "I Do Not Choose to Run" |
| 1966 | The Donna Reed Show | Crandall | Episode: "Is There a Small Hotel?" |
| 1966 | The Pruitts of Southampton | Ahmed | Episode: "Phyllis Entertains Royalty" |
| 1966–1967 | The Super 6 | Super Scuba | Voice |
| 1967–1971 | Rowan & Martin's Laugh-In | Himself | 93 episodes |
| 1968 | The Joey Bishop Show | Himself | 2 episodes |
| 1968 | Lost in Space | Fedor | Episode: "Princess of Space" |
| 1968 | The Legend of Robin Hood | Much | 1 episode |
| 1968–1980 | Hollywood Squares | Himself | 99 episodes |
| 1969 | I Dream of Jeannie | Himself | Episode: "The Biggest Star in Hollywood" |
| 1969 | The Pink Panther Show | Misterjaw | Voice |
| 1969 | Love, American Style | Harvey | Episode: "Love and the Living Doll" |
| 1969–1970 | The Andy Williams Show | Himself | 4 episodes |
| 1969–1977 | Storybook Squares | Wolfgang the Nazi, Beethoven | 46 episodes |
| 1970 | Sesame Street | German Soldier (Wolfgang) | 1 episode |
| 1970–1972 | The Glen Campbell Goodtime Hour | Himself | 4 episodes |
| 1970–1972 | The David Frost Show | Himself | 5 episodes |
| 1970–1974 | The Dean Martin Show | Himself | 4 episodes |
| 1971 | Night Gallery | J.J. Wilson | Episode: "Since Aunt Ada Came to Stay/With Apologies to Mr. Hyde/The Flip-Side of Satan" |
| 1971 | Arnold's Closet Revue | | TV film |
| 1971–1976 | The Mike Douglas Show | Himself | 11 episodes |
| 1972 | The Houndcats | Rhubarb | 13 episodes |
| 1972–1973 | The Partridge Family | Morris Tinkler, Nicholas Minsky Pushkin | 2 episodes |
| 1972–1973 | Celebrity Bowling | Himself | 4 episodes |
| 1973 | The Bob Hope Show | Himself | 1 episode |
| 1973 | The Bear Who Slept Through Christmas | Professor Werner von Bear | Voice, television film |
| 1973 | A Touch of Grace | Charlie | Episode: "The Lodge" |
| 1974 | Here's Lucy | Sir Osbird Beechman Place | Episode: "Lucy Is a Bird-Sitter" |
| 1974 | Salty | Chuck | Episode: "Scape Goat" |
| 1974 | Twice in a Lifetime | Ron Talley | TV film |
| 1974–1976 | Dinah! | Himself | 8 episodes |
| 1974–1978 | Match Game | Himself | 15 episodes |
| 1975 | Get Christie Love! | Morton Perkins | Episode: "Murder on High C" |
| 1975 | The Rookies | Justin | Episode: "S.W.A.T." |
| 1975–1976 | Tattletales | Himself | 10 episodes |
| 1975–1977 | The Bobby Vinton Show | Himself | 12 episodes |
| 1975–1979 | The Tonight Show Starring Johnny Carson | Himself | 6 episodes |
| 1976 | The Merv Griffin Show | Himself | 1 episode |
| 1976 | Celebrity Sweepstakes | Himself | 4 episodes |
| 1976 | Jigsaw John | Daltry Thomas | Episode: "Too Much, Too Soon" |
| 1977 | Baggy Pants and the Nitwits | Tyrone | 13 episodes |
| 1977 | Once Upon a Brothers Grimm | Selfish and Mean | TV film |
| 1977 | Bunco | | TV film |
| 1977–1987 | The Love Boat | Various characters | 8 episodes |
| 1978 | Bud and Lou | Eddie Sherman | TV film |
| 1978 | Kojak | Billy Butler | Episode: "Photo Must Credit Joe Paxton" |
| 1978–1981 | Fantasy Island | Ned Plummer, Fred Catlett, Professor Dwayne Clebe, Edgar Breen | 4 episodes |
| 1979 | The Dukes of Hazzard | Irving | Episode: "Double Sting" |
| 1980 | Condominium | Introduction | TV film |
| 1980 | The Love Tapes | Harlan Devane | TV film |
| 1980 | A Snow White Christmas | Brawny | TV film |
| 1980–1981 | CBS Library | Various voices | 2 episodes |
| 1981 | Password Plus | Himself | 5 episodes |
| 1982 | The Magical World of Disney | Theodore Oglivie | Episode: "Tales of the Apple Dumpling Gang" |
| 1983 | Fame | Cliff Armbruster | Episode: "Star Quality" |
| 1983 | Pac-Man | Additional Voices | Episode: "Here's Super-Pac!/Hey, Hey, Hey... It's P.J." |
| 1983 | The Dukes | Additional voices | 7 episodes |
| 1983 | Hotel | Eddie | Episode: "The Offer" |
| 1983–1988 | The Smurfs | Devil Smurf, Avalon Custodian, additional voices | 13 episodes |
| 1984 | Trapper John, M.D. | Dr. Augustus Bunche | Episode: "Play Your Hunch" |
| 1984–1985 | Glitter | Clive Richlin | 14 episodes |
| 1985 | Airwolf | Larry Mason | Episode: "Severance Pay" |
| 1985 | The 13 Ghosts of Scooby-Doo | Weerd | Voice, 13 episodes |
| 1985 | The A-Team | Sydney, Uncle Buckle-Up | Episode: "Uncle Buckle-Up" |
| 1985 | Star Fairies | Dragon Head #2 | Voice, television film |
| 1986 | Foofur | Additional voices | 3 episodes |
| 1986 | The New Mike Hammer | Oscar | Episode: "Murder in the Cards" |
| 1986–1988 | The Flintstone Kids | Additional voices | 34 episodes |
| 1987 | Murder, She Wrote | Phil Rinker | Episode: "No Laughing Murder" |
| 1987 | DuckTales | Count Ray, Dr. Ludwig von Strangeduck | Voice, 2 episodes |
| 1987 | Scooby-Doo Meets the Boo Brothers | Farquard, Skull Ghost | Voice, television film |
| 1987–1988 | Snorks | Additional Voices | 2 episodes |
| 1988 | The Completely Mental Misadventures of Ed Grimley | Additional Voices | 13 episodes |
| 1988–1989 | Fantastic Max | Additional Voices | 3 episodes |
| 1989 | The Further Adventures of SuperTed | Hummingbird | Episode: "Dot's Entertainment" |
| 1990 | Night Court | Gregor Korolenko | Episode: "The Glasnost Menagerie" |
| 1990 | Adam-12 | Preacher | Episode: "Kid Kop" |
| 1990–1992 | Tom & Jerry Kids | Unknown voices | 2 episodes |
| 1991 | Pros and Cons | Landers | Episode: "It's the Pictures That Got Small" |
| 1991 | Yo Yogi! | Lou | Voice, 9 episodes |
| 1991–1992 | General Hospital | Finian O'Toole | Recurring |
| 1992 | Bill & Ted's Excellent Adventures | Albert Einstein | Episode: "A Stand Up Guy" |
| 1993 | Droopy, Master Detective | Shadowman | Voice, episode: "Shadowman and the Blue Pigeon" |
| 1993 | Parker Lewis Can't Lose | Hotel Desk Clerk | Episode: "A Night to Remember" |
| 1993 | Café Americain | Pascal | Episode: "Every Picture Tells a Story... Don't It?" |
| 1994 | SWAT Kats: The Radical Squadron | Pop Perkins | Voice, episode: "A Bright and Shiny Future" |
| 1994–1997 | Animaniacs | Newt, Delivery Guy | Voice, 3 episodes |
| 1996 | Mad About You | Arte Johnson | Episode: "Dream Weaver" |
| 1997 | Adventures from the Book of Virtues | John's Please | Voice, episode: "Respect" |
| 1998 | The Sylvester & Tweety Mysteries | Tommy Tettrazinne | Voice, episode: "Casino Evil/Happy Bathday to You" |
| 2005 | Justice League Unlimited | Virman Vundabar | Voice, episode: "The Ties That Bind" |
