= Derek Fuller Wrigley =

Australian architect (1924–2021)

Derek Wrigley OAM
- Born: 16 February 1924; Oldham, England
- Died: 22 June 2021 (aged 97); Canberra, Australia
- Occupation: Architect
- Practice: Associated architectural firm[s]

Derek Fuller Wrigley OAM (16 February 1924 – 22 June 2021) was an Australian architect.

== Personal life ==
Wrigley was born in Oldham, Lancashire, England on 16 February 1924. He studied architecture at the College of Art and Design, graduating in 1945. He acquired qualifications in structural engineering, civic design and town planning from Manchester University.

In addition to teaching, Wrigley practiced as an architect, industrial designer and solar consultant. His career has spanned from designing and creating aids for disabled people to investigating emerging concepts in design, particular energy saving ideas such as applications for solar energy in building.

Wrigley died in Canberra, Australia on 22 June 2021 at the age of 97.

== Career ==
Emigrating from the United Kingdom to Sydney, Australia in 1947, Wrigley began his career in Australia as a lecturer at the New South Wales (NSW) University of Technology, where he stayed until 1957. Here he established the first Building science course in Australia for architects.

Wrigley left Sydney for Canberra in 1957 to take up the position of assistant to Fred Ward at the Australian National University (ANU). Following Ward's retirement in 1961, he was appointed University Architect, where he built up the Design Unit to cover all aspects of design within the university to include site planning, architecture, interior design, furniture, landscape, graphics and site signage. He retired from ANU in 1977.

Wrigley joined the Victorian Chapter of the Society of Designers for Industry (SDI) in 1948 and initiated the formation of the NSW chapter of the SDI with Alistair Morrison and Arthur Baldwinson in 1950. The SDI would become the Industrial Design Institute of Australia (IDIA) and later the Design Institute of Australia (DIA), with Wrigley appointed its inaugural honorary secretary and treasurer, a position he held until 1957. In 1956, Wrigley together with Fred Ward, co-founded the NSW Chapter of the Industrial Design Council of Australia (IDCA). As Canberra expanded, he saw the need to have an Australian Capital Territory (ACT) Chapter of the IDCA, initiating its formation in 1958. he was appointed its chairman when it was incorporated in 1973, and was the president from 1980 until 1981. In that same year he co-founded the ACT Craft Council, where he was appointed vice president for two years. Wrigley retired from the IDA board in 1986.

Wrigley's attention turned to new emerging concepts in design, in particular energy saving ideas that resulted from good design. To propagate his ideas further, he helped establish a non-profit group called The New Millwrights in 1978, which consisted of a group of concerned professionals whose aim was to inform the community about socially responsible alternatives to home design and energy use.

He organised the Technical Aid to the Disabled (TAD), ACT Branch in 1979. He was elected vice president of TAD Federation of all Australian states in 1980 and assisted in the establishment of a joint Design AID committee between the Design Council and the National Committee of Independent Living Centres. He was the design coordinator of the TAD until 1991.

After retiring from formal practice, he spent his time researching applications for solar energy in building and experimenting with low-energy and low-resource retrofitting of existing houses.

== Awards ==
Wrigley was awarded Life Fellowship of the DIA in 1980, he was also a Fellow of the Australian Institute of Architects (AIA), an Associate of the Royal Institute of British Architects and held a Diploma of Architecture from the College of Art and Design, Manchester, United Kingdom.

At the 1989 Australia Day Honours, Wrigley was awarded the Medal of the Order of Australia for service to people with physical disabilities.

== Notable projects ==
Wrigley built a solar house in Griffith, ACT which is listed by the AIA as an 'outstanding' building for its time. The house was designed by Wrigley in 1957 and completed in 1959 as his personal residence. The original building is an example of the post-war Melbourne regional style whereas the western extension to the house, designed by Wrigley in 1966, is an example of the late twentieth century Sydney regional style. 14 Jansz Crescent is regarded as a significant residence by the AIA because in its component parts, it is a good example of two architectural styles.

Another notable project by Wrigley is the Mawson House, a townhouse in suburban Canberra that was retrofitted by Wrigley to use renewable energies rather than fossil fuels. The house incorporates a series of devices to improve its energy efficiency, generating its own solar electricity, ventilating and cooling itself without cost or pollution and treats its own gray water for irrigation.

Wrigley wrote, designed and self-published Making Your Home Sustainable in June 2004, describing the various low-energy features of the Mawson house. It is also a practical guide for home-owners, builders and architects who are concerned about the effects of climate change and environmental degradation. The book sold 1400 copies in 8 months with the 5th edition now published by Scribe Publications.
