= Chronicon Scotorum =

Medieval Irish chronicle

Chronicon Scotorum, also known as Chronicum Scotorum, is a medieval Irish chronicle.

== Overview ==
According to Nollaig Ó Muraíle, it is "a collection of annals belonging to the 'Clonmacnoise group', covering the period from prehistoric times to 1150 but with some gaps, closely related to the 'Annals of Tigernach'. It survives in a paper copy made by Dubhaltach MacFhirbhisigh c.1640 from an exemplar no longer extant."

MacFhirbhisigh's copy was held by his friend (and possible pupil) Ruaidhrí Ó Flaithbheartaigh in the late 17th century, but was in France for a time in the 1760s before its purchase by Trinity College Dublin in 1776. Edited and published by William M. Hennessy in 1866, it is accorded to be one of the more valuable Irish annals by virtue of its computational data which were frequently distorted in other such compilations.

Gilla Críst Ua Máel Eóin has been associated with the text as its compiler, but if so, it was continued at some point after his death. His actual role in relation to the Chronicon is uncertain.

== Editions ==
- Mac Niocaill, Gearóid (ed. and tr.). Chronicon Scotorum. Edition and translation available from CELT].
- Hennessy, William M. (ed. and tr.). Chronicum Scotorum. A Chronicle of Irish Affairs, from the earliest times to A.D. 1135, with a supplement containing the events from 1141 to 1150. Roll Series 46. London, 1866. Reprinted: Wiesbaden, 1964. PDF available from the Internet Archive.

== Sources ==
- The Encyclopaedia of Ireland, ed. Brian Lalor, Dublin, 2003.
