= David Malone =

David Malone may refer to:

- David Malone (independent filmmaker) (born 1962), British documentary filmmaker
- David Malone (sport shooter) (born 1964), Irish sports shooter
- David Malone (swimmer) (born 1977), Irish paralympian
- David M. Malone (1954-2025), Canadian scholar-diplomat
- Dave Malone (born 1952), American guitarist/vocalist of The Radiators
