= Edward Malone =

Edward Malone is the name of:

- Eddie Malone (baseball) (1920–2006), American professional baseball player
- Edward Cyril Malone (born 1937), Saskatchewan lawyer and politician
- Eddie Malone (born 1985), Scottish footballer
- Edward Malone, the protagonist of the 1912 Arthur Conan Doyle novel The Lost World and its sequels

== See also ==
- Ted Malone (disambiguation)
- Ed Malone (disambiguation)
