= Ted Malone (disambiguation) =

Ted Malone was a radio broadcaster.

Ted Malone may also refer to:

- Edward Cyril Malone, former leader of the Saskatchewan Liberal Party
- Ted Malone (Australian politician)

== See also ==
- Edward Malone (disambiguation)
