= Gus Malone =

Scottish footballer (born 1960)

Personal information
- Full name: Gordon Malone
- Date of birth: 27 January 1960 (age 66)
- Place of birth: Dundee, Scotland
- Position: Midfielder

Senior career*
Years	Team	Apps	(Gls)
–1988	Tayport		
1982–1985	Brechin City	41	(7)
- Dundee Downfield
–1986	Brechin City	1	(0)
1987–1993	Cowdenbeath	155	(30)
- Dundee St Joseph's
- Carnoustie Panmure
- Maryfield Juveniles
- Tayport
- * Club domestic league appearances and goals

Gordon "Gus" Malone (born 27 January 1960), is a Scottish retired footballer who played as a midfielder in the Scottish League for Cowdenbeath and Brechin City. He later served as assistant manager at St Andrews United until May 2014.

== Honours ==
Brechin City

- Scottish League Second Division: 1982–83

Individual

- Cowdenbeath Hall of Fame
