= Texie Waterman =

American choreographer (1931–1996)

- Born: November 25, 1931; Dallas, Texas, U.S.
- Died: October 14, 1996 (aged 64); Dallas, Texas, U.S.
- Education: Highland Park High School
- Occupations: dancer choreographer dance teacher
- Spouse(s): Arte Johnson (divorced); Unknown (divorced); Hugh Howard (her death)

Texie Jane Waterman (November 25, 1931 – October 14, 1996) was an American choreographer, dancer, and dance teacher. She was the first choreographer for the Dallas Cowboys Cheerleaders.

== Early life ==
Waterman was born in Dallas on November 25, 1931, to Robert Harold Waterman and Texie Willis Waterman. She attended Highland Park High School. Her mother was a dance instructor who co-founded the Dallas Civic Ballet. Waterman grew up taking dance classes and, at the age of 17, started teaching dance in various towns in Texas, including Mineola.

== Career ==
Waterman performed in summer musicals and, by the time she was twenty years old, she was performing on Broadway in New York City. In the 1950s, she was a dancer at the Copacobana and Versailles nightclubs in New York City. She also danced on Sid Caesar's variety show Your Show of Shows. Waterman eventually moved back to Dallas and took up teaching in the two dance studios owned by her mother. She owned her own dance studio in Casa View, Dallas, where she taught jazz dance and musical theatre.

In 1954, Watterman met Dee Brock while the two were performing in the summer musical Wish You Were Here. Brock went on to become the director of the Dallas Cowboys Cheerleaders and, in 1972, she hired Waterman as their first choreographer in an effort to change the image of the squad. She choreographed for the cheerleaders from 1972 to 1983. She made appearances with members of the team on The Love Boat in 1977 and the 1979 film Dallas Cowboys Cheerleaders and the 1989 film Dallas Cowboys Cheerleaders II.

She retired in 1983 and was succeeded as choreographer by Shannon Baker Werthmann, a former squad member.

== Personal life ==
While dancing in the Poconos, Waterman met the actor Arte Johnson. They married in 1957 and later divorced. She married a second time, but that marriage also ended in divorce. Waterman married a third time to Hugh Howard, an advertising executive.

She died of lung cancer in Dallas in 1996. She is buried at Restland Memorial Park outside Dallas.
