= Frank Malone =

Frank Malone may refer to:

- Frank Malone (Gaelic footballer) (1903–1953), Irish Gaelic footballer
- Frank Malone (Shortland Street), a character on Shortland Street
