= Amy Malone =

American politician

Member of New Hampshire House of Representatives for Strafford 9
- Incumbent
- Assumed office December 4, 2024
- Preceded by: Brandon Phinney
- Succeeded by: Nevin Dexter (elect)

Personal details
- Party: Democratic

Amy Malone is an American politician. She is a member of the New Hampshire House of Representatives.
