= Mick Malone (soldier) =

Australian soldier and author (born 1947)

Mick Malone OAM
- Malone on Nadzab Pad Nui Dat after being hauled out of the bush by hot extraction, September 1969
- Born: 27 April 1947 (age 79); Binnaway, New South Wales
- Spouse: Joanne Malone (m. 1975)
- Military career
- Allegiance: Australia
- Branch: Australian Army (1966–1992); Australian Army Reserve (1993–2001)
- Service years: 1966–2001
- Rank: Captain
- Service number: 217115
- Units: Special Air Service Regiment (1967–85; 1991–93); 1st Commando Regiment (1987–89)
- Conflicts: Vietnam War
- Awards: Medal of the Order of Australia

Michael John Malone, OAM (born 27 April 1947) is an Australian writer and former soldier, who served in the Australian Army from the age of nineteen until his retirement in 1992. Malone served with the Special Air Service Regiment for most of his career, including a single tour of duty to the Vietnam War in 1969–70. In 1989, Malone was awarded the Medal of the Order of Australia (OAM) for service to the Australian Army.

== Early life, family and education ==
Malone was born on 27 April 1947 in Binnaway, New South Wales. He is the first child of Edmund (Ned) and Joyce Malone, and elder brother of Helen Ryan (née Malone). He attended St Stanislaus' College, Bathurst, for three years, from 1959 to 1963, and later attended St. Bernard’s College, Katoomba. Malone was a strong rugby union player and was elected Juvenile Captain of St. Charles House at St. Stanislaus. On leaving school, Malone worked in the Dalgety woolstores in Darling Harbour before choosing to enlist in the army after reading a newspaper article about the gallantry of Australian soldiers in the Battle of Long Tan.

== Military career ==
=== Early career ===
Malone enlisted in the Australian Army in 1966 at age nineteen. After completing basic training in Kapooka, he underwent initial employment training at the School of Infantry in Ingleburn. While completing his training at Ingleburn, Malone was encouraged to apply for a place on the Special Air Service Regiment (SASR) selection course to be held in Western Australia. Malone was selected to SASR in 1967 and was posted to 3 Squadron at Campbell Barracks in Perth.

=== Vietnam ===
As Malone trained in preparation for deployment to Vietnam, he received news that his cousin, Peter Anthony Malone, had been killed in action in Vietnam. Peter was the same age as Mick, and the two were very close: he had enlisted in the Australian Army at seventeen and was serving with the 3rd Cavalry Regiment in M113 Armoured Personnel Carriers. He was killed when the Armored Personnel Carrier he was commanding in Bien Hoa Province hit a landmine, on 18 January 1969. Despite this, Malone chose to fulfil his commitment and deployed for Vietnam with 3 Squadron in February 1969. Malone served for twelve months with the Australian forces in Nui Dat, participating in numerous patrols as a signaler, including several patrols where he came close to losing his life.

=== Post war ===
Upon returning to Australia, Malone began immediate preparations to return to Vietnam as a patrol commander for his second tour, in 1971–72, but this plan was ruined with Prime Minister Gough Whitlam's announcement in July 1971 that he had called off Australia’s commitment in Vietnam. With war out of the picture, Malone and the other members of the SASR turned their attention to preparation for future conflicts. Malone was instrumental in the establishment of the Special Air Service Regiment Vehicle Mounted Troop in the early 1970s, and trained extensively in counter-terrorism, freefall parachuting, and water operations. As his career progressed, Malone was gradually promoted: lance corporal in February 1971; corporal in February 1972; sergeant in May 1976; and warrant officer class two in December 1981.

In 1985, Malone was posted to the Royal Military College, Duntroon, to evaluate potential future troop commanders for the SASR. He was promoted to warrant officer class one in 1987 and posted to the 1st Commando Regiment in Sydney as regimental sergeant major. He was posted back to Canberra in 1989, where he served for two years with the Headquarters, Special Forces. It was here that Malone was awarded the Medal of the Order of Australia for service to the Australian Army. In 1991, Malone was posted one final time, back to Perth, where he served as second-in-command of the SASR Training Squadron. He was offered voluntary redundancy at the end of 1992, and chose to retire.

== Post-army life ==
Immediately after retirement, Malone was offered the opportunity to manage the Army Museum of Western Australia and oversaw its relocation from Dilhorn House to its current location at the Fremantle Artillery Barracks. Malone also founded Imprimatur Military Books, an antiquarian mail-order military book business, which was one of the earliest commercial bookseller websites on the internet in 1993. Malone sold Imprimatur Books in 2024 but maintains its publishing arm.

== Writing ==
In 1997, Malone assembled and edited SAS – A Pictorial History of the Australian Special Air Service, 1957–1997 as part of the SASR 40th anniversary celebrations. Along with Peter Lutley, Malone wrote a biography of Australian Victoria Cross winner Ray Simpson, who he once met as a young soldier in Nui Dat. The book, Simmo: A Biography of Ray Simpson, VC, DCM: One of Australia's Finest Soldiers, was published in April 2015. In 2024, Malone published his memoir, Two Ranks On The Road, 35 Years of Australian Special Forces Service to coincide with Anzac Day 2024. In April 2025, he published his second autobiography relating to his childhood, entitled Hail Mary, the Creek’s Up: From the Banks of the Castlereagh to the SAS. As of May 2026, he has begun to finalize his new biography on Australian Victoria Cross winner Peter Badcoe.

== In Media ==
Malone is the co-host of a podcast focused on his military career, entitled Never Die Wondering: Mick Malone in His Own Words, in which Malone reads aloud his autobiographies with discussion to follow. This podcast is co-hosted and produced by Malone's son, Toby.

== Personal life ==
Malone met his future wife, Joanne Blue, at a house party in 1974 and the two were married on 19 April 1975. They had two children, Toby and Georgia. He has two grandchildren.
