= Pat Malone (wrestler) =

American professional wrestler

Personal information
- Born: Edgar Bryan Davie; 25 August 1900 Illinois, U.S.
- Died: 15 March 1988 (aged 87)

Professional wrestling career
- Ring name(s): Eddie Malone; Green Ghost; Mr. X Pat Malone; Purple Flash; The Green Shadow
- Billed height: 5 ft 11 in (1.80 m)
- Billed weight: 200 lb (91 kg)
- Debut: 1930s
- Retired: 1956

Edgar Bryan Davie (August 28, 1900 –March 15, 1988), better known as Pat Malone was an American professional wrestler.

== Career ==
Malone debuted in the early 1930s, and was known for his tenure in the Tennessee territory as a heel named The Green Shadow, teaming with Roy Welch.

During the 1950s, Malone travelled and wrestled with Ginger the Wrestling Bear. Ginger died on July 8, 1958, before a scheduled bout in Barrie, Ontario.

Malone died 15 March 1988, aged 87.

== Championships and accomplishments ==
- Gulas-Welch Enterprises
  - World Junior Heavyweight Championship (Tennessee version) (1 time)
