= 40 Guns to Apache Pass =

1967 film by William Witney

- Original film poster
- Directed by: William Witney
- Written by: Willard W. Willingham (as Willard Willingham); Mary Willingham
- Produced by: Grant Whytock
- Starring: Audie Murphy
- Cinematography: Jaques R. Marquette
- Edited by: Grant Whytock
- Music by: Richard LaSalle
- Color process: Eastmancolor
- Production companies: Admiral Pictures; Robert E. Kent Productions
- Distributed by: Columbia Pictures
- Release dates: April 16, 1967 (Los Angeles); May 1, 1967 (United States)
- Running time: 95 minutes
- Country: United States
- Language: English
- Budget: $400,000

40 Guns to Apache Pass is a 1967 American Western film directed by William Witney and starring Audie Murphy.

== Plot ==
In the Arizona Territory of 1868, the Apaches, led by Cochise (Michael Keep), are on the warpath. Army Captain Bruce Coburn (Audie Murphy) is tasked with escorting homesteaders to Apache Wells where they can concentrate their defense against the Apaches. But there is dissension in the ranks as some of the men under Coburn's command feel they are being driven too hard. Coburn has to discipline corporal Bodine (Kenneth Tobey) for stealing rationed water. In an attack at Apache Wells, one of the homesteaders, Harry Malone (Kenneth MacDonald), is killed. His two sons, Mike (Michael Blodgett, the elder) and the younger and more timid Doug (Michael Burns), then join the Army.

In order to defend themselves at Apache Wells, they need guns. Coburn is sent to bring in a consignment of repeating rifles that is on its way, or at least prevent them from getting into the hands of the Apaches. En route, Coburn and his men are attacked. The inexperienced Malone brothers are left to guard the horses, but Mike disobeys orders and goes off to fight the Indians. He is last seen alive pleading for his younger brother's help, but Doug, never having experienced combat and badly frightened by the Apaches, is too afraid to come to his older brother's rescue. When the other soldiers discover Doug hiding behind some rocks and sobbing, he is scorned as a coward. His shame is complete when he subsequently overhears the disgusted Capt. Coburn say he has no use for "a worthless yellow kid".

The survivors of the patrol manage to rendezvous with the consignment of guns. On the way back to Apache Wells, Bodine and four other soldiers decide to take the guns and desert to Mexico, leaving Coburn and the wounded First Sergeant Walker (Robert Brubaker) tied up. After some hesitation, Doug again disappoints Coburn when he throws in his lot with the deserters, after Bodine promises to release the two captives. But Bodine intends to kill them, lighting a fuse on a keg of dynamite in the wagon to which Coburn is tied.

After Coburn frees himself from his bonds seconds before the wagon explodes, he helps the wounded Walker back to Apache Wells. He wants to go back and retrieve the rifles, but the commander, Col. Reed (Byron Morrow), says he cannot spare any men and orders Coburn to stay, threatening him with court-martial for the failure of his mission. Disobeying orders, Coburn sets off alone after Bodine anyway, who is attempting to sell the stolen rifles to the Apaches for gold. Under a flag of truce, Bodine meets Cochise and agrees to take him to where the rifles are hidden.

Meanwhile, Capt. Coburn finds and single-handedly attacks the deserters guarding the cache of rifles. Doug, still smarting from being branded a coward by Coburn, summons new-found courage and enters the fray, helping Coburn kill the other deserters and recover the rifles. Coburn extends his hand to Doug to show that he now respects the youth as an honorable soldier, before ordering him to get the rifles to Apache Wells.

Cochise and Bodine pursue and catch up with Coburn. In a delaying tactic, Coburn distributes five repeating rifles in positions where he can fight off a number of Apaches. When Doug delivers the rifles to the garrison at Apache Wells and explains to Col. Reed what happened, the commander orders the rifles issued to the soldiers to rescue Coburn, with Doug leading them to the besieged captain's location. The rescue party arrives just as he is almost out of ammunition. After a fierce battle, the Apaches are chased off and Bodine flees alone with Coburn in pursuit. In a final shootout between the two foes, Coburn kills Bodine. Doug accompanies Coburn and the triumphant soldiers back to Apache Wells, where Coburn is welcomed by a grateful Col. Reed, and Doug is reunited with his family who had feared him dead.

== Cast ==
- Audie Murphy as Capt. Bruce Coburn
- Byron Morrow as Col. Homer E. Reed
- Robert Brubaker as First Sgt. Walker
- Kenneth Tobey as Cpl. Bodine
- Ted Gehring as Trooper Barratt
- Willard W. Willingham as Trooper Fuller
- James Beck as Trooper Higgins
- Michael Blodgett as Trooper Mike Malone
- Michael Burns as Trooper Doug Malone
- Kenneth MacDonald as Harry Malone
- Kay Stewart as Kate Malone
- Laraine Stephens as Ellen Malone
- Michael Keep as Cochise

== Production ==
The film was written by Audie Murphy's friend Willard W. Willingham and his wife. Willingham had appeared in many of Murphy's films (playing Trooper Fuller in this one) as a stand in, stuntman and occasional actor as well as writing several of his films. It was filmed in 1966 in Red Rock Canyon State Park (California) and Lancaster, California. Murphy's fee was $50,000.

== See also ==
- List of American films of 1967
