= List of people from Fort Worth, Texas =

The following are people of note who were born in, live in, or have formerly resided in Fort Worth, Texas.

== Sports ==
- Lance Cole Barrett (born 1984), Major League Baseball umpire
- Tom Buckman (born 1947), professional football player
- Beau Burrows (born 1996), MLB pitcher
- Chennedy Carter (born 1998), professional basketball player for Atlanta Dream
- Raymond Clayborn (born 1955), NFL football player
- Kyle Crick, professional baseball player for the Pittsburgh Pirates
- Donald Curry, former undisputed world welterweight boxing champion
- John Douglas (1945–2005), NFL player
- Brandon Finnegan, professional baseball pitcher for the Kansas City Monarchs
- Jack Haden (1914–1996), football player
- Phil Handler (1908–1968), NFL football player and coach
- Brad Hawpe (born 1979), professional baseball player
- Irv Hill (1908–1978), American football running back in the NFL for the Chicago Cardinals and Boston Redskins
- Brock Holt (born 1988), professional baseball player
- Rogers Hornsby (1896–1963), Hall of Fame baseball player
- Keith Langford, professional basketball player
- Yale Lary (1930–2017), Football Hall of Famer
- Rod Manuel (born 1974), football player
- Rags Matthews (1905–1999), football player for TCU
- Suzanne Mitchell, director of the Dallas Cowboys Cheerleaders
- Jay Needham (born 1984), professional soccer player, SMU Athletics Hall of Fame
- Jeff Newman, MLB All-Star baseball player and manager
- William Paulus, swimmer and former world record holder in the 100m Butterfly
- Hunter Pence (born 1983), MLB baseball player
- Mike Renfro (born 1955), former NFL player
- Bryan Reynolds (born 2001), soccer player who represented the United States national team
- Chuck Reynolds (born 1946), football player
- Mike Richardson (born 1946), NFL player
- A'Shawn Robinson (born 1995), NFL player; attended Arlington Heights High School in Fort Worth
- John Roderick (born 1944), professional football player
- Johnny Rutherford (born 1938), race car driver, three-time winner of Indy 500
- Denise Rutkowski (born 1961), professional bodybuilder
- By Saam (1914–2000), sportscaster
- Annie Sanders (born 2007), professional rock climber
- Kelly Shoppach (born 1980), Major League Baseball catcher (2005–2013)
- Allyson Simpson (born 2000), professional ice hockey defenceman for the New York Sirens
- Slick (1957–), WWE wrestling manager
- AJ Smith-Shawver, professional baseball pitcher for the Atlanta Braves
- Hurley Tarver (born 1975), football player
- Tylan Wallace (born 1999), NFL football player, attended South Hills High School
- Cade Winquest (born 2000), Major League baseball pitcher
- Jeana Yeager (born 1952), broke distance records during her (and Dick Rutan's) 1986 nonstop flight around the world in an experimental Voyager

== Politics and law ==
- Lawrence A. Alexander (born 1943 in Fort Worth), law professor
- Betty Andujar (1912–1997), first Republican woman in Texas State Senate (1973–1983)
- H.S. Broiles (1845–1913), 6th mayor of Fort Worth, Texas
- Joel Burns (born 1969), politician
- Reby Cary (1920–2018), educator, historian, and member of the Texas House of Representatives
- Francis Cherry (1908–1955), governor of Arkansas
- Nicole Collier (born 1972), member of the Texas House of Representatives
- L. Clifford Davis (1924–2025), civil rights attorney and judge
- Charlie Geren (born 1949), member of Texas House of Representatives from District 99 in Tarrant County
- Pete Geren (born 1952), former member of U.S. House of Representatives; former U.S. secretary of the Army; director of Sid W. Richardson Foundation
- Craig Goldman (born 1968), member of Texas House of Representatives from District 97 in Fort Worth
- Kay Granger (1943–2026), U.S. representative and mayor of Fort Worth
- John Hodgson (fl. 2022), Kentucky state representative born in Fort Worth
- Debra Lehrmann, Texas Supreme Court justice, Place 3
- Joe K. Longley, former president of the Texas State Bar
- Dario Lorenzetti (born 1970), CIA officer killed in Afghanistan
- Lorraine Miller, first woman president of the NAACP, interim president and CEO, 2014
- John T. Montford (born 1943), businessman and former member of the Texas Senate
- "Pappy" O'Daniel (1890–1969), governor of Texas, U.S. senator and radio personality
- Bill Owens (born 1950), former governor of Colorado (1999–2007)
- Hugh Parmer (1939–2020), mayor of Fort Worth 1977–1979; member of both houses of Texas State Legislature
- Bennett Ratliff (born 1961), state representative from District 115 in Dallas County; civil engineer
- Tom Schieffer (born 1947), U.S. ambassador to Japan, candidate for governor
- Mark M. Shelton (born 1956), pediatrician and politician
- Jonathan Stickland (born 1983), state representative from Tarrant County
- Bascom N. Timmons (1890–1987), journalist and political advisor
- Marc Veasey (born 1971), U.S. representative for Texas
- Daniel E. Walker (1927–2009), civil servant, rescued remains of flag burned in protest at 1984 Republican National Convention in Dallas
- Jim Wright (1922–2015), U.S. congressman from Texas and speaker of the House

== Film and television ==
- Adrienne Ames (1907–1947), actress, radio host
- Texas Rose Bascom (1922–1993), film and television actress, National Cowgirl Hall of Fame inductee 1981
- Patricia Blair (1933–2013), actress
- Wes Brown (born 1982), actor
- Betty Buckley (born 1947), Tony Award-winning actress
- Kate Capshaw (born 1953), actress, married to Steven Spielberg
- Julio Cedillo (born 1970), actor, raised in Fort Worth
- Candy Clark (born 1947), Oscar-nominated actress
- Kenneth Copeland (born 1936), televangelist
- Noah Cottrell, actor
- Shelley Duvall (1949–2024), actress
- George Eads (born 1967), actor
- Richard Gilliland (1950–2021), actor best known as JD Shackleford in Designing Women
- Judy Graubart (born 1943), actress, The Electric Company
- Larry Hagman (1931–2012), actor, son of actress Mary Martin, played J.R. Ewing in Dallas
- Bug Hall (born 1985), actor
- Harriet Sansom Harris (born 1955), actress, Frasier, Desperate Housewives
- Martha Hyer (1924–2014), Oscar-nominated actress
- Jesse Jane (1980–2024), pornographic actor
- Benton Jennings, actor
- Candace Kita, actress and model
- Wallace Langham (born 1965), actor, The Larry Sanders Show, CSI: Crime Scene Investigation, and CSI: Vegas
- David Mann (born 1966), actor, comedian and gospel singer
- Tamela Mann (born 1966), actor, singer and songwriter
- Lisa McRee (born 1961), television journalist
- Leighton Meester (born 1986), actress
- Lynn Merrick (1919–2007), actress
- Dan Hewitt Owens (born 1947), actor
- Fess Parker (1924–2010), actor
- Bill Paxton (1955–2017), actor, starred in Titanic, Frailty, TV series Big Love; attended Arlington Heights High School in Fort Worth
- Richard Rawlings (born 1969), entrepreneur and reality television star
- Rex Reed (born 1938), film critic, actor, television host
- Rod Roddy (1937–2003), television announcer on game shows, like Press Your Luck & The Price is Right
- Ginger Rogers (1911–1995), actress and dancer who moved to Fort Worth at age 9; attended Central (Paschal) High School
- Bob Schieffer (born 1937), journalist, CBS Evening News anchor and Face the Nation host
- Michael "Bear" Taliferro (1961–2006), actor
- Hunter Tylo (born 1962), actress
- Lisa Whelchel (born 1963), actress, The Facts of Life
- Keith L. Williams, actor
- Van Williams (1934–2016), actor, The Green Hornet
- Morgan Woodward (1925–2019), actor, Dallas and Cool Hand Luke
- Carlson Young (born 1990), actress, Scream

== Military ==
- Horace S. Carswell Jr. (1916–1944), USAAF, KIA World War II; posthumous Medal of Honor recipient; namesake of Carswell Air Force Base
- Robert David Law (1944–1969), Medal of Honor recipient
- Charles F. Pendleton, posthumous Medal of Honor recipient for actions in the Korea War; R. L. Paschal High School, Class of 1953
- William C. Rogers III (1938–2025), United States Navy captain of the USS Vincennes; involved in the shootdown of Iran Air Flight 655

== Music ==
- Trey Anastasio (born 1964), guitarist, singer, songwriter, and composer best known as the lead guitarist of the rock band Phish
- Gerry Beckley (born 1952), singer-songwriter, founding member of the band America
- Leon Bridges (born 1989), soul singer and Grammy nominee
- T-Bone Burnett (born 1948), Oscar-winning songwriter, record producer, musician
- Kelly Clarkson (born 1982), Grammy winning singer, original American Idol winner, Emmy winner talk show host
- Van Cliburn (1934–2013), pianist
- Ornette Coleman (1930–2015), jazz musician
- Jeff Current, lead singer of Against All Will
- Bobby Day (1928–1990), musician
- John Denver (born Henry John Deutschendorf Jr., 1943–1997), singer-songwriter
- Johnny Dowd (born 1948), musician
- Manet Harrison Fowler (1895–1976), singer, music educator, painter
- Kirk Franklin (born 1970), gospel singer and producer
- Pat Green (born 1972), country musician
- Marcus Haddock (born 1957 in Fort Worth), opera singer
- Taylor Hawkins (1972–2022), drummer for Foo Fighters
- Julius Hemphill (1938–1995), jazz composer and saxophone player
- Jules Hoffman, children's musician
- iayze, rapper and songwriter
- Ronald Shannon Jackson (1940–2013), jazz drummer
- Cody Jinks, country music singer-songwriter
- Prince Lasha (William Lawsha) (1929–2008), jazz saxophonist and flutist
- Vaden Todd Lewis (born 1965), lead vocalist and guitarist for the rock band Toadies
- Samuel S. Losh (1884–1943), vocalist, composer, and music educator
- Kirstin Maldonado (born 1992), singer-songwriter
- Tamela Mann (born 1966), gospel singer and actress
- Delbert McClinton (born 1940), singer-songwriter
- Roger Miller (1936–1992), singer-songwriter
- Gary Morris (born 1948), singer
- Oh, Sleeper, heavy metal band
- Dewey Redman (1931–2006), free jazz saxophonist
- Wallace Scott (born 1943), twin of Walter Scott; a lead singer of the R&B group The Whispers
- Walter Scott (1943–2025), twin of Wallace Scott; a lead singer of the R&B group The Whispers
- Townes Van Zandt (1944–1997), country music singer-songwriter
- William Walker (1931–2010), opera singer and director
- Red Young (born 1948), bandleader, arranger, composer

== Academics and writing ==
- Mel Bradford (1934–1993), literary critic
- Heloise Bowles Cruse (1919–1977), syndicated columnist, Hints from Heloise
- James T. Draper, Jr. (born 1935), author, Baptist leader
- Clare B. Dunkle (born 1964), author, librarian
- John Graves (1920–2013), author of Goodbye to a River
- Beth Haller, journalism professor
- Patricia Highsmith (1921–1995), author of Strangers on a Train and The Talented Mr Ripley
- Lillian B. Horace (1880–1965), author, educator, librarian
- Dan Jenkins (1929–2019), sports journalist and author
- Sally Jenkins (born 1960), sports journalist and author
- Mary Daggett Lake (1880–1955), historian, botanist, and educator
- Robert L. Lynn (1931–2020), journalist, poet, and retired college president
- Blanche McVeigh (1895–1970), printmaker and art educator
- Hazel Harvey Peace (1907–2008), educator, activist, and humanitarian
- Jenny Lind Porter (1927–2020), poet and educator
- Theresa A. Powell (1952–2023), academic administrator
- Ben H. Procter (1927–2012), historian
- Rex Reed (born 1938), film critic
- Lenora Rolla (1904–2001), activist, educator, and historian
- Jennie Scott Scheuber (1860–1944), public library pioneer and Fort Worth's first librarian
- Liz Smith (1923–2017), journalist, syndicated columnist
- Blake R. Van Leer (1897–1956), colonel, civil rights icon, and president of Georgia Institute of Technology

== Science ==
- Alan Bean (1932–2018), artist, retired NASA astronaut (1981); R. L. Paschal High School, Class of 1950; carried Paschal High School's flag to the Moon
- Robert Bruce Merrifield (1921–2006), biochemist who won the Nobel Prize in Chemistry in 1984
- Clyde Snow (1928–2014), forensic anthropologist

== Business and philanthropy ==
- Sid Bass (born 1943), billionaire, Sundance Square developer, major stockholder in The Walt Disney Company
- Electra Carlin (1912–2000), art dealer
- Amon G. Carter (1879–1955), civic booster, philanthropist, creator and publisher of Fort Worth Star-Telegram
- T. Cullen Davis (born 1933-2026), millionaire tried and acquitted for 1976 murders of Stan Farr and Andrea Wilborn
- Edna Gladney (1886–1961), founder of Edna Gladney Home
- Brad Hunstable (born 1978), founder of Ustream
- Hazel Vaughn Leigh (1897–1995), founder of the Fort Worth Boys Club
- Bill Noël (1914–1987), oil industrialist and philanthropist from Odessa, born in Fort Worth
- Sid W. Richardson (1891–1959), oilman, cattleman and philanthropist
- Lucille Elizabeth Bishop Smith (1892–1985), entrepreneur, chef, and inventor
- A. Latham Staples (born 1977), CEO of EXUSMED, civil rights activist and founder of Empowering Spirits Foundation

== Criminals ==
- Ronald and James Allridge, serial killer brothers; Ronald was executed in 1995 and James in 2004
- Mark David Chapman (born 1955), assassin of John Lennon
- Joe Michael Ervin (1951–1981), serial killer
- Kenneth Granviel (1950–1996), serial killer and rapist
- Ricky Lee Green (1960–1997), serial killer
- Edward Lagrone (1957–2004), serial killer and rapist

== Other ==
- Opal Lee, activist promoting the Juneteenth federal holiday
- G. Craige Lewis (born 1969), Christian minister
- Gretchen Polhemus, Miss Texas USA 1989 and Miss USA 1989
- Skratch (born 1972), pinstripe artist and fabricator
- Randy Souders (born 1954), visual artist and disability rights advocate
