= Ruta Lee =

Canadian-born American and Lithuanian actress and dancer

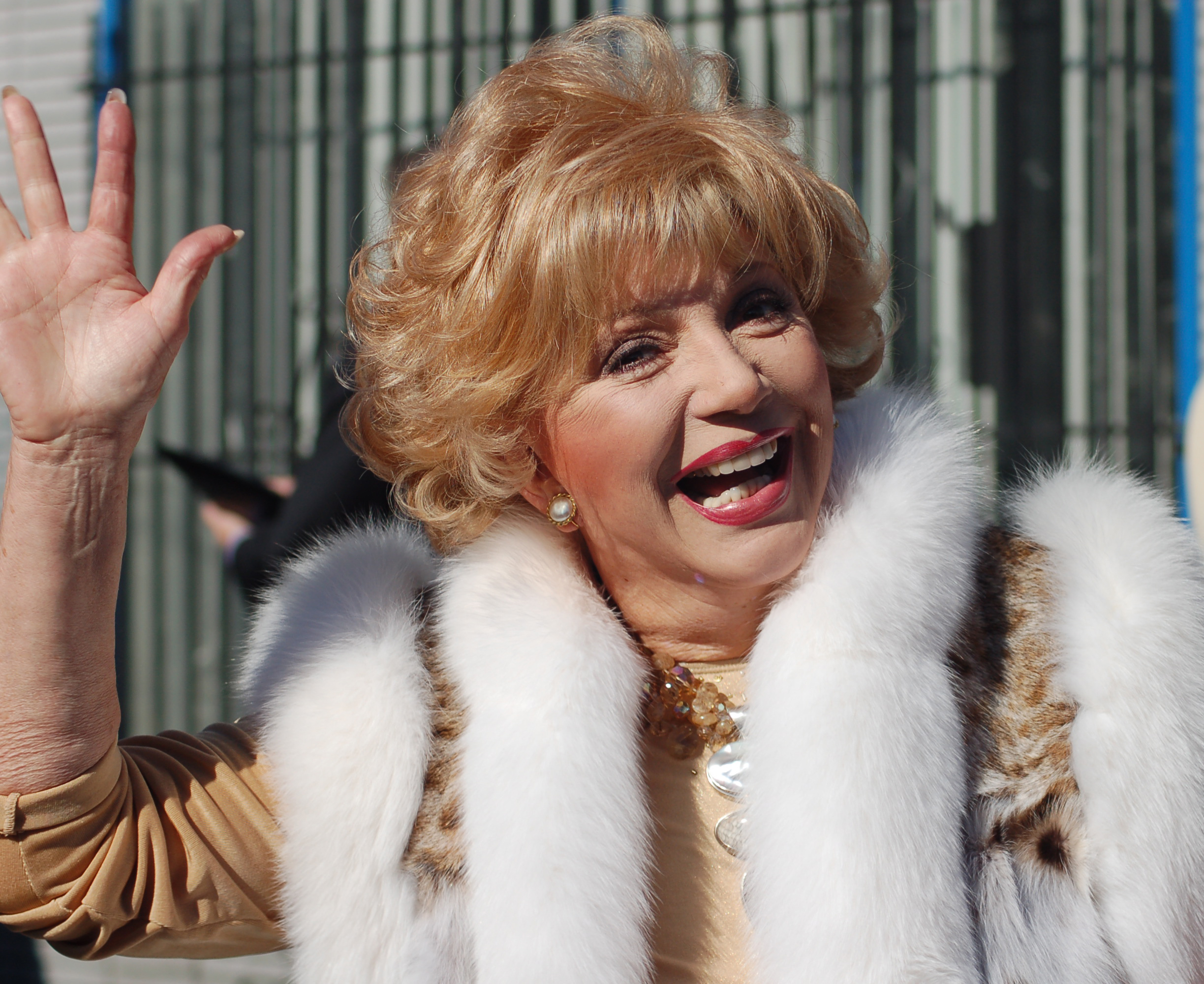
- Ruta Lee attending ceremony for Leslie Caron's star on the Hollywood Walk of Fame, December 8, 2009
- Born: Ruta Mary Kilmonis; May 30, 1935 (age 91); Montreal, Quebec, Canada
- Citizenship: Canada, United States, Lithuania
- Education: Los Angeles City College; UCLA
- Occupations: Actress, dancer
- Years active: 1952–present
- Spouse: Webster B. Lowe Jr. (m. 1976; died 2020)

Ruta Lee (born Ruta Mary Kilmonis; May 30, 1935) is a Canadian-born American actress and dancer of Lithuanian descent. She was born in Montreal, Canada, to Lithuanian immigrant parents. Ruta Lee appeared as one of the brides in the musical Seven Brides for Seven Brothers. She had roles in films including Billy Wilder's crime drama Witness for the Prosecution and Stanley Donen's musical comedy Funny Face, and also is remembered for her guest appearance in a 1963 episode of Rod Serling's sci-fi series The Twilight Zone called "A Short Drink from a Certain Fountain".

Lee guest-starred on many television series, and was also featured on a number of game shows, including Hollywood Squares, What's My Line?, and Match Game, and as Alex Trebek's co-host on High Rollers.

== Early life ==
Ruta Lee was born on May 30, 1935, in Montreal, Quebec, the only child of Lithuanian immigrants. Her father was a tailor and her mother a homemaker.

On March 1, 1948, her family moved to the United States and ended up settling in Los Angeles, where she graduated in 1952 from Hollywood High School and began studying acting and appearing in school plays. She attended both Los Angeles City College and the University of California at Los Angeles. She worked as a cashier, usherette, and candy girl at Grauman's Chinese Theatre, but when she was $40 short in her cash account at the end of her shift one night, she was fired.

== Career ==
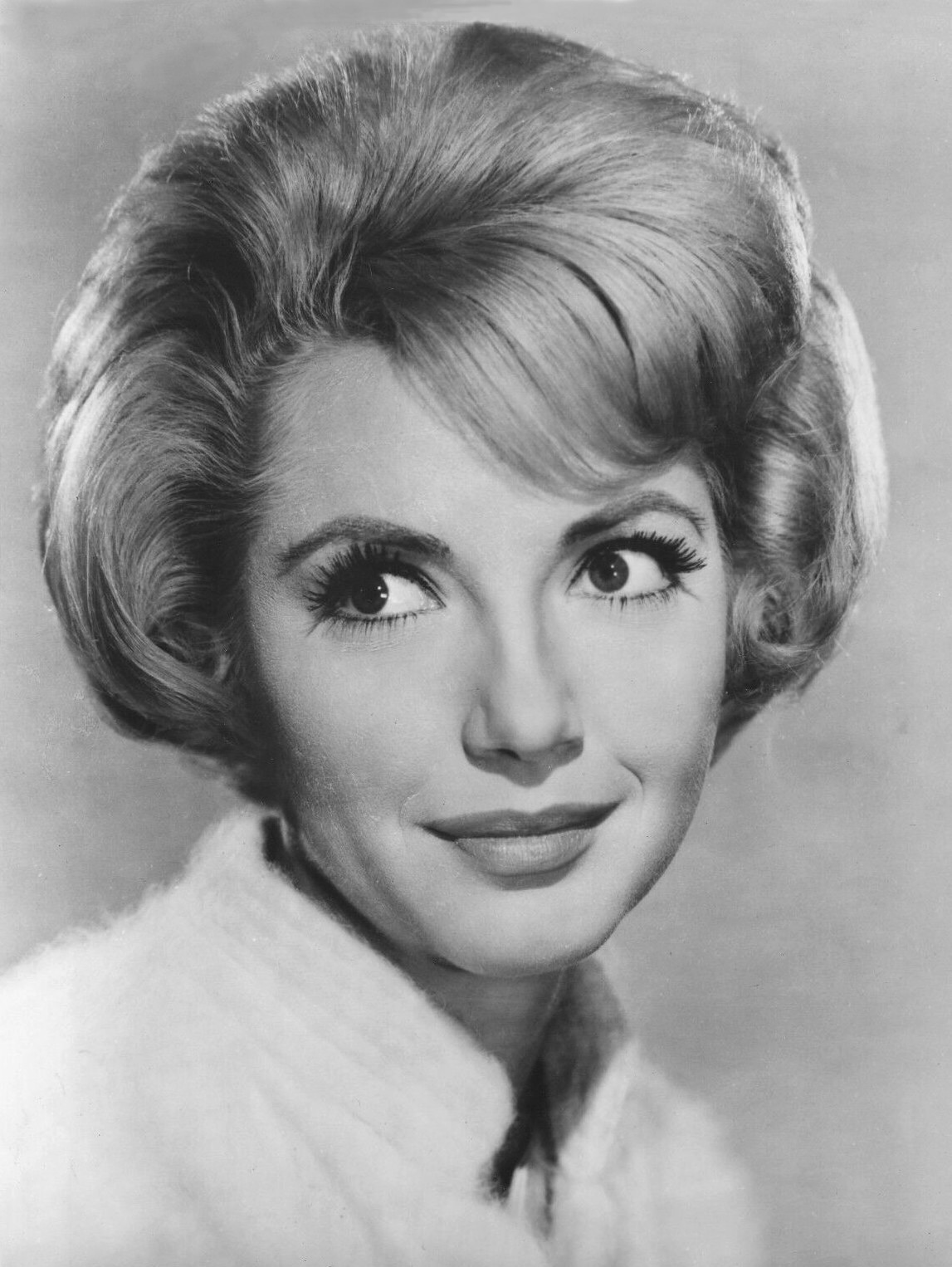
Lee c.1960

Lee then got a break as a guest on two episodes of CBS's The George Burns and Gracie Allen Show. She soon found an agent, who landed her a job in an episode of The Roy Rogers Show, followed by a spot in 1953 on the series Adventures of Superman. That same year, while acting in a small theater production of On the Town, she landed a role as bride Ruth in the Academy Award-nominated musical Seven Brides for Seven Brothers, while still billed as Ruta Kilmonis. She appeared in several films, including Anything Goes (1956), Funny Face (1957), Witness for the Prosecution (1957), and Marjorie Morningstar (1958). In 1962, she played the female lead in the Rat Pack comedy/Western film Sergeants 3 starring Frank Sinatra, Dean Martin, Sammy Davis Jr., Peter Lawford, and Joey Bishop. Lee then co-starred with Audie Murphy and Darren McGavin in a Western, Bullet for a Badman (1964).

In addition to films, Lee has appeared in dozens of guest-starring roles on television. For a number of years, she seemed to be everywhere on the small screen. From 1957 to 1959, she was cast in different roles in eight episodes of the CBS crime drama series The Lineup, appeared in the episode "Armored Car" in the second season of Highway Patrol, and also played the leading lady in three episodes of Maverick: "The Comstock Conspiracy" (1957) with James Garner, "The Plunder of Paradise" (1958), and "Betrayal" (1959) with Jack Kelly. In 1959 and 1960, she was cast in four episodes of John Bromfield's syndicated crime drama U.S. Marshal.

She appeared as Ellen Barton in the 1960 episode "Grant of Land" of the ABC Western series, The Rebel, starring Nick Adams. She also made five guest appearances on the CBS courtroom drama series Perry Mason between 1958 and 1965, including the roles of murderer Connie Cooper in "The Case of the Screaming Woman" (1958), defendant Millie Crest in "The Case of the Foot-Loose Doll" (1959), as Vita Culver in "The Case of the Prudent Prosecutor" (1960), Vivian Cosgrave in the episode "The Case of the Libelous Locket" (1963), and as Irene Prentice in "The Case of the Gambling Lady" (1965).

Lee was further cast on Richard Diamond, Private Detective, Alfred Hitchcock Presents, Mickey Spillane's Mike Hammer, Sugarfoot, M Squad, Gunsmoke (as title character “Jenny” in 1962), 77 Sunset Strip, The Alaskans, Colt .45, Wagon Train, Bat Masterson, Hawaiian Eye, Rawhide, The Wild Wild West, Ironside, Yancy Derringer, The Fugitive, and three episodes of Hogan's Heroes. Lee appeared in two guest spots of The Andy Griffith Show, in 1962 and 1965.

Also in 1965, she was cast as a movie star named Gloria Morgan in the episode "Gomer Dates a Movie Star" on the sitcom Gomer Pyle - U.S.M.C.. In 1963, she was cast in CBS's The Twilight Zone in the episode "A Short Drink from a Certain Fountain" as a cold, callous gold digger whose elderly husband undergoes a scientific experiment to make himself younger and more attractive to her, aging "backward" a bit more than he anticipated. In 1967, Lee appeared in two episodes of The Lucy Show; the titular replacement in “Lucy’s Substitute Secretary”, which aired on January 2; and as herself in “Lucy Meets the Berles”, which aired on September 11.

Lee also began appearing regularly on game shows such as Hollywood Squares, You Don't Say, and Match Game. In the early 1970s, Lee continued to perform in both film and television roles on Love, American Style and The Mod Squad, and had a role in the film The Doomsday Machine (1972). By 1974, Lee had grown frustrated by an increasing lack of roles, and took a job co-hosting the daytime game show High Rollers. She remained with the show until 1976.

During the 1980s, she lent her voice to episodes of The Flintstone Comedy Show and The Smurfs, in addition to guest roles on CHiPs, Fantasy Island, The Love Boat, and Charles in Charge. Lee also performed extensively in the mid-1980s on stage, including the title character in the musical Peter Pan.

From 1988 to 1989, Lee played a recurring role on the CBS sitcom Coming of Age. In 1989, she played the role of Sally Powers in the television movie Sweet Bird of Youth with Elizabeth Taylor. In the 1990s, Lee continued to appear in episodic television, most notably on the sitcom Roseanne. Lee appeared as the girlfriend of Bev Harris (Estelle Parsons), whose character had inadvertently "outed" herself.

She played the wife of Jerry Lewis's character in the British comedy-drama Funny Bones (1995), in which they play the parents of Oliver Platt's character. In 2002, Lee was presented with one of the Golden Boot Awards for her work in Western television and cinema.

In 2006, Lee received a star on the Hollywood Walk of Fame for her contributions to the television industry. In 1995, a Golden Palm Star on the Palm Springs Walk of Stars was dedicated to Lee.

In February 2008, Lee appeared as Clairee in a production of Steel Magnolias with Sally Struthers at the Casa Mañana theatre in Fort Worth, Texas. In October 2010, Lee played the role of Miss Mona in The Best Little Whorehouse in Texas, also at the Casa Mañana.

In 2024, Lee appeared as a guest judge on season nine, episode six of RuPaul's Drag Race All Stars.

== Personal life ==
In 1976, Lee married Texan restaurant executive Webster B. "Webb" Lowe Jr. They divided their time between their homes in Hollywood, Palm Springs, Fort Worth, and Las Hadas, Mexico. Webb died July 1, 2020. They had no children. Lee describes her political views as "conservative" and she appeared at the 1972 Republican National Convention. On August 24, 2013, Lee was inducted into the National Lithuanian American Hall of Fame.

In February 2019, Lee was granted Lithuanian citizenship.

=== Off-camera ===
In 1964, Lee called then-Soviet Premier Nikita Khrushchev, asking him to pardon her octogenarian grandmother Ludvise Kamandulis, who had been sent to an internment camp in Siberia. The pardon was granted, and Lee's grandmother came to live with her in California later that same year. Kamandulis died two years later. Lee again rescued a relative from the former Soviet Union when she secured custody of her 18-year-old cousin, Maryte Kaseta, from Lithuania in 1987.

Lee has been involved with the charitable organization The Thalians for over 50 years. In addition to raising money and providing services for troubled youth and mental-health organizations, Lee, who is also the board chairman, co-produced the annual Ball of the Thalians with the late Debbie Reynolds throughout these five decades. In 2011, after 55 years of involvement with The Thalians, she stepped down and is now a member emerita. In 2025, Lee announced that she would no longer be able to honor autograph requests both in person and through standard postal mail anymore due in part to her advanced age.

== Filmography ==
=== Motion pictures ===
Film
| Year | Title | Role | Notes |
|---|---|---|---|
| 1954 | Seven Brides for Seven Brothers | Ruth | Credited as Ruta Kilmonis |
| 1955 | The Girl in the Red Velvet Swing | Tennis Girl | Uncredited |
| 1955 | The Twinkle in God's Eye | Ruthie | |
| 1956 | Anything Goes | Girl | Uncredited |
| 1956 | Gaby | Denise | |
| 1957 | Funny Face | Lettie | |
| 1957 | Witness for the Prosecution | Diana | |
| 1958 | Marjorie Morningstar | Imogene Norman | |
| 1961 | Operation Eichmann | Anna Kemp | |
| 1962 | Sergeants 3 | Amelia Parent | |
| 1963 | The Gun Hawk | Marleen | |
| 1963 | Hootenanny Hoot | A.G. Bannister | |
| 1964 | Bullet for a Badman | Lottie | Alternative title: Renegade Posse |
| 1965 | Invisible Diplomats | Connie Wisner | Short subject produced by AT&T |
| 1972 | Doomsday Machine | Dr. Marion Turner | Alternative title: Escape from Planet Earth; shot in 1967 |
| 1983 | Rooster: Spurs of Death! | Gayly | |
| 1983 | Cracking Up | Ms. Sultry (voice) | Alternative title: Smorgasbord |
| 1995 | Funny Bones | Laura Fawkes | |
| 1997 | Pterodactyl Woman from Beverly Hills | Mrs. Poole | |
| 2001 | Pretty When You Cry | Antique Store Patron | Alternative title: Seduced: Pretty When You Cry |
| 2004 | Quiet Kill | Doris | Alternative title: Nightmare Boulevard |
| 2006 | Sadie and the Slot Machines | Sadie Silver | Short film |
| 2007 | A Christmas Too Many | Grandma | Direct-to-DVD release |
| 2011 | Forever Young at Heart | Shelley Felgerstein | Short film |

=== Television ===
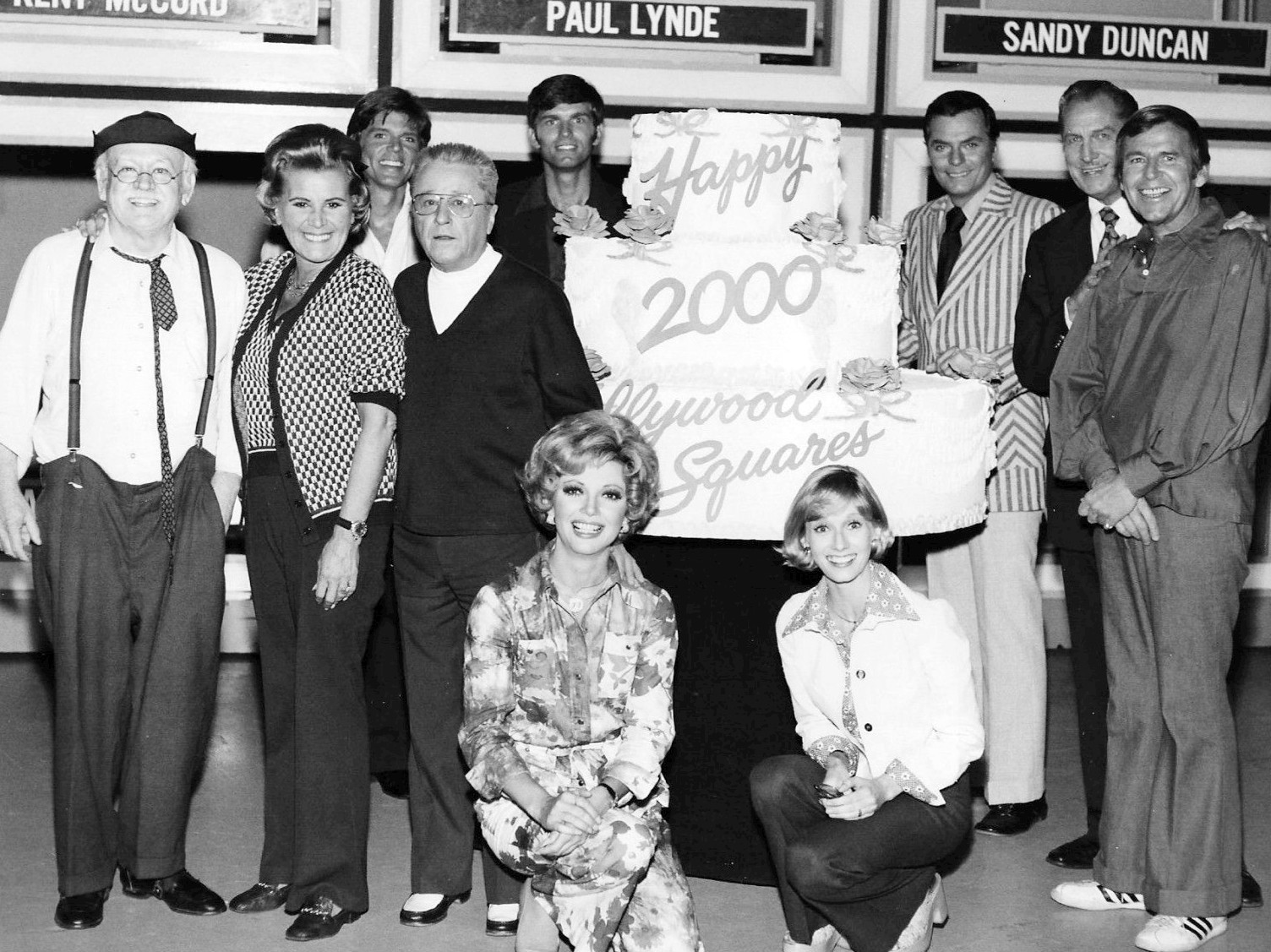
Photo from the television game show Hollywood Squares to celebrate the 2,000th episode in 1974. Pictured are Cliff Arquette as Charley Weaver, Rose Marie, John Davidson, George Gobel, Kent McCord, Peter Marshall, Vincent Price and Paul Lynde. Ruta Lee and Sandy Duncan, foreground.

Television
| Year | Title | Role | Notes |
|---|---|---|---|
| 1952–1957 | Schlitz Playhouse of Stars | Various roles | 2 episodes |
| 1953 | Adventures of Superman | Teenager | Episode: "My Friend Superman"; Credited as Ruta Kilmonis |
| 1953–1955 | Burns and Allen | Various roles | 2 episodes |
| 1954 | Lux Video Theatre | Marion | Episode: "I'll Never Love Again" |
| 1955 | Science Fiction Theatre | Student | Episode: "The Unexplored" |
| 1955 | Alfred Hitchcock Presents | Ruby Boyenton | Season 1 Episode 13: "The Cheney Vase" |
| 1956 | Alfred Hitchcock Presents | Angel | Season 1 Episode 26: "Whodunit" |
| 1956 | I Led 3 Lives | Louise Burke | Episode: "New Member" |
| 1956 | Dragnet | | Episode: "The Big Daughter" |
| 1957 | Highway Patrol | Lea Franklin | Episode: "Armored Car" |
| 1957 | Suspicion | Betty | Episode: "The Story of Marjorie Reardon" |
| 1957 | Captain David Grief | Rose | Episode: "The Affair at Les Trois Magots" |
| 1957–1959 | Maverick | Various roles | 3 episodes |
| 1957–1959 | The Lineup | Various roles | 8 episodes |
| 1958 | The Gray Ghost | | Episode: "Contraband" |
| 1958 | Playhouse 90 | | Episode: "The Right Hand Man" |
| 1958 | The Walter Winchell File | Joan | Episode: "The Dice of Fortune: File #34" |
| 1958 | Mickey Spillane's Mike Hammer | Various roles | 2 episodes |
| 1958 | Man with a Camera | Dolly MacDermott | Episode: "Second Avenue Assassin" |
| 1958 | Rescue 8 | Ann Dagget | Episode: "The Cage" |
| 1958 | December Bride | Carol Hodges | Episode: "Bride's Father-in-Law" |
| 1958–1959 | Sugarfoot | Various roles | 2 episodes |
| 1958–1960 | M Squad | Various roles | 3 episodes |
| 1958–1962 | Gunsmoke | Various roles | 2 episodes including "Jenny" |
| 1958–1964 | 77 Sunset Strip | Various roles | 5 episodes |
| 1958–1965 | Perry Mason | Various roles | 5 episodes |
| 1959 | Yancy Derringer | Romilly Vale | Episode: "Two of a Kind" |
| 1959 | The Restless Gun | Lucy Collins | Episode: "The Painted Beauty" |
| 1959 | Peter Gunn | Marie Gipson | Episode: "Edie Finds a Corpse" |
| 1959 | The Millionaire | Angela Temple | Episode: "Millionaire Angela Temple" |
| 1959 | Richard Diamond, Private Detective | Louise | Episode: "Jukebox" |
| 1959 | Bat Masterson | Nellie Fontana | Episode: "The Death of Bat Masterson" |
| 1959 | Alcoa Theatre | Emily Meadows | Episode: "Medals for Harry" |
| 1959 | The Lawless Years | Gloria Fallon | Episode: "The Payoff" |
| 1959 | Markham | Tammy Miles | Episode: "The Duelists" |
| 1959 | Johnny Staccato | Dee Dee | Episode: "The Naked Truth" |
| 1959 | Tightrope! | Laura | Episode: "Stand on Velvet" |
| 1959 | Whirlybirds | Ginny | Episode: "Mr. Jinx" |
| 1959 | Hennesey | Ruth Thomas | Episode: "Hennesey and Peyton Place" |
| 1959 | The Man from Blackhawk | Ginnie Thompson | Episode: "The Legacy" |
| 1959–1960 | U.S. Marshal | Various roles | 4 episodes |
| 1959–1960 | The Alaskans | Various roles | 2 episodes |
| 1959–1960 | Colt .45 | Various roles | 2 episodes |
| 1959–1963 | Wagon Train | Various roles | 2 episodes |
| 1960 | Shotgun Slade | Lilly Cody | Episode: "Killer's Brand" |
| 1960 | The Rebel | Ellen Barton | Episode: "Grant of Land" |
| 1960–1961 | Hawaiian Eye | Various roles | 3 episodes |
| 1961 | The Tab Hunter Show | | Episode: "Turnabout" |
| 1961 | Michael Shayne | Naomi Lester | Episode: "Spotlight On a Corpse" |
| 1961 | Dante | Peggy Braddock | Episode: "Dante's Fickle Fate" |
| 1961 | The Brothers Brannagan | Lynn | Episode: "Shot in the Dark" |
| 1961 | The Case of the Dangerous Robin | | Episode: "Brink of Disaster" |
| 1961 | Zane Grey Theatre | Jenny Aldrich | Episode: "Man from Everywhere" |
| 1961 | Harrigan and Son | Rose | Episode: "The Legacy" |
| 1961 | Stagecoach West | Various roles | as Jenny Forbes in episode The Marker + 1 other episode |
| 1961 | Laramie | Opal Crane | Episode: "Siege at Jubilee" |
| 1962 | Outlaws | Jennie | Episode: "Farewell Performance" |
| 1962 | Poor Mr. Campbell | Priscilla Edwards | Television film |
| 1962 | Gunsmoke | Jenny Glover | Episode: "Jenny" |
| 1962 | Cheyenne | Lenore Walton Hanford | Episode: "Wanted for the Murder of Cheyenne Bodie" |
| 1962 | The Dick Powell Show | Eva Gobel | Episode: "Crazy Sunday" |
| 1962–1963 | Rawhide | Various roles | 2 episodes |
| 1962–1965 | The Andy Griffith Show | Andy on Trial as Jean Boswell, The Hollywood Party as Darlene Mason | 2 episodes |
| 1963 | Bonanza | Rita Marlowe | Episode: "A Woman Lost" |
| 1963 | Arrest and Trial | Colleen Riley | Episode: "Call It a Lifetime" |
| 1963 | The Twilight Zone | Flora Gordon | Episode: "A Short Drink from a Certain Fountain" |
| 1963 | Temple Houston | Lucy Tolliver | Episode: "Enough Rope" |
| 1963 | Fractured Flickers | Herself | Episode 20 |
| 1964 | The Travels of Jaimie McPheeters | Zoe Pigalle | Episode: "The Day of the Lame Duck" |
| 1964 | The Fugitive | Mrs. Janet Loring | Episode: "Angels Travel on Lonely Roads: Part 2" |
| 1964 | The Virginian | Various roles | 2 episodes |
| 1964–1965 | Burke's Law | Various roles | 3 episodes |
| 1965 | The Bill Dana Show | Yvette Renay | Episode: "Beauty and the Bellhop" |
| 1965 | Gomer Pyle - U.S.M.C. | Gloria Morgan | Episode: "Gomer Dates a Movie Star" |
| 1965 | The Wackiest Ship in the Army | Lori | Episode: "The Stowaway" |
| 1965–1967 | The Wild Wild West | Various roles | 2 episodes |
| 1967 | The Lucy Show | Miss Audrey Fields; herself | Episodes: "Lucy's Substitute Secretary"; "Lucy Meets the Berles" |
| 1967 | Judd, for the Defense | Alida Nye | Episode: "To Love and Stand Mute" |
| 1967 | Mannix | Jean Coleman | Episode: "Run, Sheep, Run" |
| 1967–1969 | Hogan's Heroes | Various roles | 3 episodes |
| 1968 | Ironside | Marian | Episode: "To Kill a Cop" |
| 1969 | The Guns of Will Sonnett | Fan | Episode: "Trail's End" |
| 1969 | The Flying Nun | Faye/Sister Mary Grace | 2 episodes |
| 1969 | Marcus Welby, M.D. | Shirley Ballinger | Episode: "All Flags Flying" |
| 1969–1972 | Love, American Style | Various roles | 3 episodes |
| 1971 | Mayberry R.F.D. | Terry Phillips | Episode: "The City Planner" |
| 1971 | A Howling in the Woods | Sharon | Television movie |
| 1971 | The Mod Squad | Gloria Hardy | Episode: "Exit the Closer" |
| 1971 | Arnie | Miss Fletcher | Episode: "Et Tu, Arnie" |
| 1972 | Me and the Chimp | Lavelle Wiggins | Episode: "My Pet, the Thief" |
| 1973 | Match Game | Guest panelist | One Week |
| 1974-1976 | High Rollers | Co-Hostess | Daytime |
| 1974 | Indict and Convict | Phyllis Dorfman | ABC Movie of the Week |
| 1974 | Roll, Freddy, Roll! | Evelyn Danton Kane | ABC Movie of the Week |
| 1979 | Mork & Mindy | Lisa | Episode: "Mork's Night Out" |
| 1979–1982 | Three's Company | Various roles | 2 episodes |
| 1980–1982 | The Flintstone Comedy Show | Hidea Frankenstone (Voice) | 18 episodes |
| 1980 | Vega$ | Gloria Garland | Episode: "Love Affair" |
| 1980 | The Ghosts of Buxley Hall | Ernestine Di Gonzini | Television movie |
| 1980–1983 | Fantasy Island | Various roles | 3 episodes |
| 1981 | Elvis and the Beauty Queen | Su-Su | Television movie |
| 1982 | Three's Company | Marsha | Episode: "The Matchbreakers" |
| 1982 | Simon & Simon | Penny Russell | Episode: "Matchmaker" |
| 1982 | Madame's Place | Kaye Jacobs | Episode #1.42 |
| 1983 | CHiPs | Babe | Episode: "Journey to a Spacecraft" |
| 1984 | The Rousters | Mrs. Slade | Episode: "Slade vs. Slade" |
| 1984 | Hotel | Georgia Potter | Episode: "Ideals" |
| 1984–1985 | 1st & Ten | Rona | 4 episodes |
| 1985 | The Love Boat | Harriet Wolters | Episode: "Vicki's Gentleman Caller/Partners to the End/The Perfect Arrangement" |
| 1985 | Benson | Zelda Romancova | Episode: "Solid Gold" |
| 1987–1989 | The Smurfs | Evelyn / Morgan Lafay (voices) / Additional Voices | 3 episodes |
| 1988 | Scooby-Doo and the Ghoul School | Revolta (Voice) | Television movie |
| 1988–1989 | Coming of Age | Pauline Spencer | 15 episodes |
| 1989 | Sweet Bird of Youth | Sally Powers | Television movie |
| 1989 | Jake and the Fatman | Leilani Simmons | Episode: "Sweet Leilani" |
| 1990 | Timeless Tales from Hallmark | Scarlotta (voice) | Episode: "Rapunzel" |
| 1990 | Charles in Charge | Gloria | Episode: "Three Dates and a Walnut" |
| 1990 | People Like Us | Faye Converse | Television movie |
| 1990 | Murder, She Wrote | Renee | Episode: "A Body to Die For" |
| 1992 | Delta | Charlotte Tyler | Episode: "How Much Is That Darden in the Window?" |
| 1993 | The Building | Sylvia | Episode: "Yakkity Yak Don't Talk" |
| 1997 | Roseanne | Joyce | 2 episodes |
| 1998 | Saved by the Bell: The New Class | Mrs. Gore | Episode: "Cigar Wars" |
| 2000 | Power Rangers Lightspeed Rescue | Koko Kashmere | Episode: "In the Limelight" |
| 2003 | Life with Bonnie | Mrs. Ruta Blanchette | Episode: "Places, Stat!" |
| 2005 | Studio House | Lily Fargate | Television movie |
| 2006 | Christmas Do-Over | Granny Conlon | Television movie |
| 2007 | Christmas at Cadillac Jack's | Rose Jenkins | Television movie |
| 2012 | Days of Our Lives | Tillie Inman | Episode #1.11749 |
| 2024 | RuPaul's Drag Race All Stars & Untucked! aftershow | Herself; guest judge and comedy coach | Season 9, episode 6 |

== See also ==
- List of Canadian actors
- List of Lithuanian actors
- List of dancers
- List of people from Fort Worth, Texas
- List of people from Montreal
- List of people from Palm Springs, California
- List of University of California, Los Angeles people
