= Butler Place Historic District =

Historic district in Texas, United States

- U.S. National Register of Historic Places
- U.S. Historic district
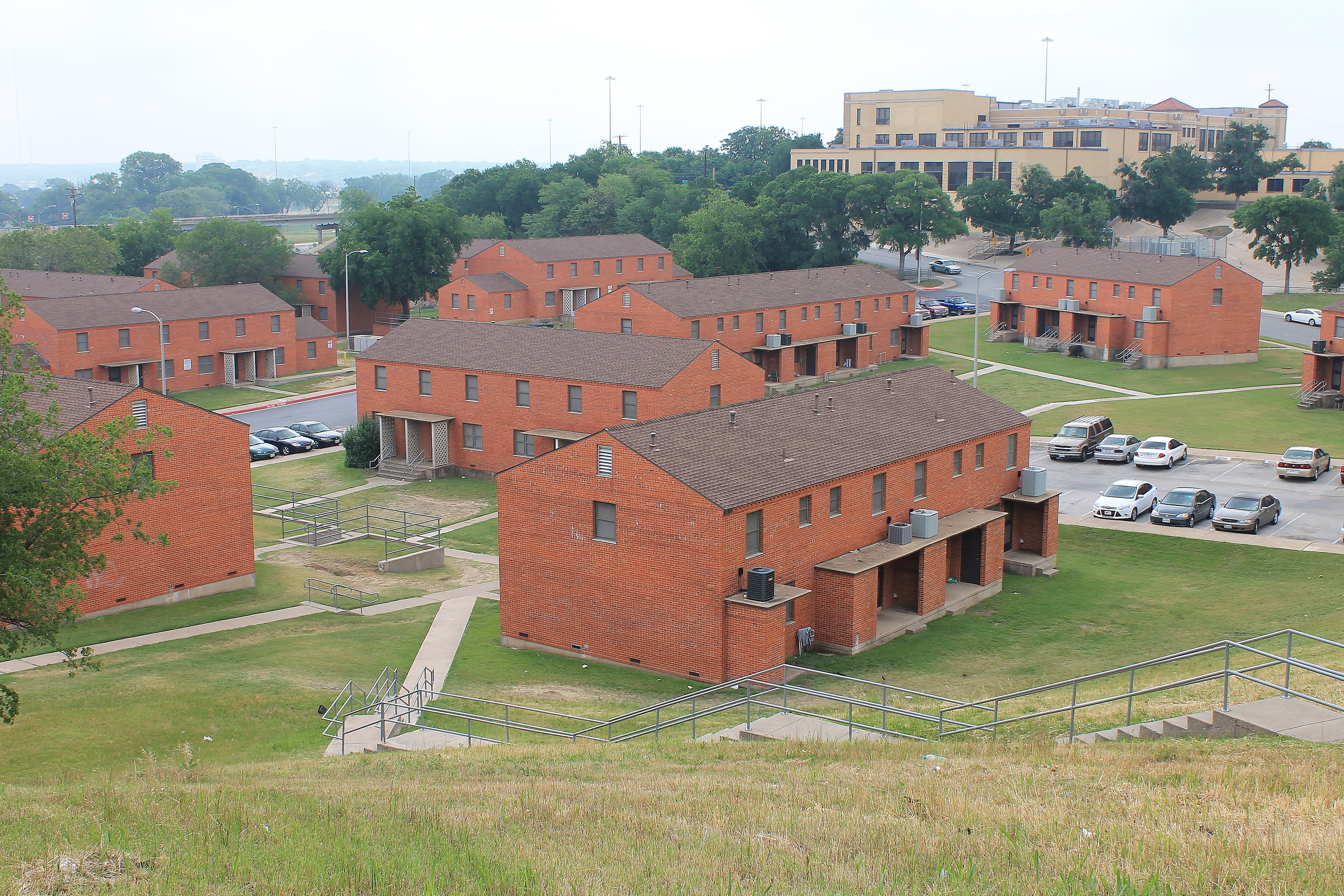
- Butler Place in 2013

- Location within Texas Location within the United States
- Location: Roughly bounded by Luella St., I.M. Terrell Way Cir. M., 19th St. & I 35W,, Fort Worth, Texas
- Coordinates: 32°44′59″N 97°19′1″W
- Area: 42 acres (17 ha)
- Built: 1940
- Architect: W.G. Clarkson, C.O. Chromaster, J.R. Pelich, H.H. Crane, P. Geren
- Architectural style: Colonial Revival, Moderne
- NRHP reference No.: 11000514
- Added to NRHP: August 4, 2011

Butler Place Historic District is a 42-acre area east of the central business district of Fort Worth, Texas. From about 1940 to 2020, it was a public housing development with 412 units. The site is now to be dedicated to a new purpose, perhaps a museum focused on African Americans in Fort Worth's history.

Before the housing community was built, the area was known as Chambers Hill. In the 1930s, Chambers Hill was notorious for squalid housing and prostitution. In 1938 the Fort Worth Chamber of Commerce lobbied the Public Works Administration to help clear the dilapidated housing in Chambers Hill and replace it with low-rent housing. Financed by local and federal money, Butler Place opened in 1941. When it opened, rents ranged from $15.50 to $16.75 per month.

The housing project was named after Henry H. Butler, a Civil War veteran, who settled in Fort Worth after the war and became its first African American teacher. He was a friend of I. M. Terrell, for whom the closest school is named. The housing project was added to the National Register of Historic Places on August 4, 2011.

== See also ==
- I.M. Terrell High School, located within the district
- National Register of Historic Places listings in Tarrant County, Texas
