= Opal Lee =

American activist (born 1926)

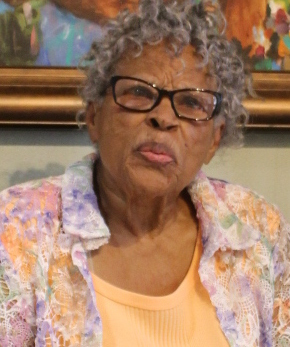
- Lee in 2021
- Born: October 7, 1926 (age 100); Marshall, Texas, U.S.
- Education: Wiley College (BA); North Texas State University (MA)
- Occupations: Activist; Counselor
- Known for: "Grandmother of Juneteenth"

Opal Lee (born October 7, 1926) is an American retired teacher, counselor, and activist who was a leader in the movement to make Juneteenth a federally recognized holiday. She is often described as the "grandmother of Juneteenth".

On June 17, 2021, President Joe Biden signed Senate Bill S. 475, making Juneteenth the eleventh federal holiday. In 2024, Biden awarded Lee the Presidential Medal of Freedom, the Nation's highest civilian honor.

== Early life ==
Lee was born in Marshall, Texas on October 7, 1926. She was the oldest of three children of Mattie (Broadous) and Otis Flake. Her paternal great-grandmother was born into slavery in Louisiana.

When she was 10 years old, she and her family moved to Fort Worth, Texas. The Flakes later moved to the 7th Ward of Fort Worth, also known as Terrell Heights.

In June 1939, her parents bought a house in the 900 block of East Annie Street, then a mostly white area. On June 19, 1939, 500 white rioters vandalized and burned down their home. Lee was twelve years old at the time. Recalling it years later, she said, "The fact that it happened on the 19th day of June has spurred me to make people understand that Juneteenth is not just a festival."

Opal Lee attended I.M. Terrell High School, Fort Worth's first black high school, graduating in 1943 at the age of 16. She married and the couple had four children; they divorced after five years.

== Professional career ==
Lee receiving the Presidential Medal of Freedom in 2024

In 1952, Lee graduated from Wiley College in Marshall, Texas, receiving her Bachelor's degree in elementary education. She taught at Amanda McCoy Elementary School for 15 years, working nights at Convair to support her children. In 1967 she married Dale Lee, when she was a teacher at McCoy Elementary School and he was the principal at Morningside Elementary. Lee later attended North Texas State University (now University of North Texas) where she earned her master's degree in Counseling and Guidance.

After receiving her master's degree, Lee returned to Fort Worth, where she was an educator for the Fort Worth Independent School District (FWISD) for fifteen years and a home school counselor for nine years before retiring in 1977. She was also a member of the Fort Worth-Tarrant County Community Action Agency (CAA) board, Evans Avenue Business Association board, Tarrant County Habitat for Humanity board and Citizens Concerned with Human Dignity. She currently serves on the Unity Unlimited, Inc. Board. Opal Lee is a member of Zeta Phi Beta sorority. On May 14, 2023 Lee received an honorary doctorate degree from the University of North Texas. On May 11, 2024 Lee received an honorary doctorate degree from Southern Methodist University in Dallas, Texas.

== Activism and later life ==
Following her retirement from teaching in 1976, Lee became involved in Fort Worth community causes. Lee helped found the Tarrant County Black Historical and Genealogical Society, alongside civil rights activist Lenora Rolla. She helped organize Fort Worth's annual Juneteenth celebration. Lee helped campaign for Ann Richards, Texas Gubernatorial candidate and Presidential candidate Barack Obama. During the 1980s, Lee originated a tradition of bringing Fort Worth city leaders on an annual bus tour through economically depressed areas of Fort Worth, pointing out landmarks important to Fort Worth's minority communities. Her nonprofit organization, Unity Unlimited Inc., has been in operation since 1994 and was officially incorporated in 2000.

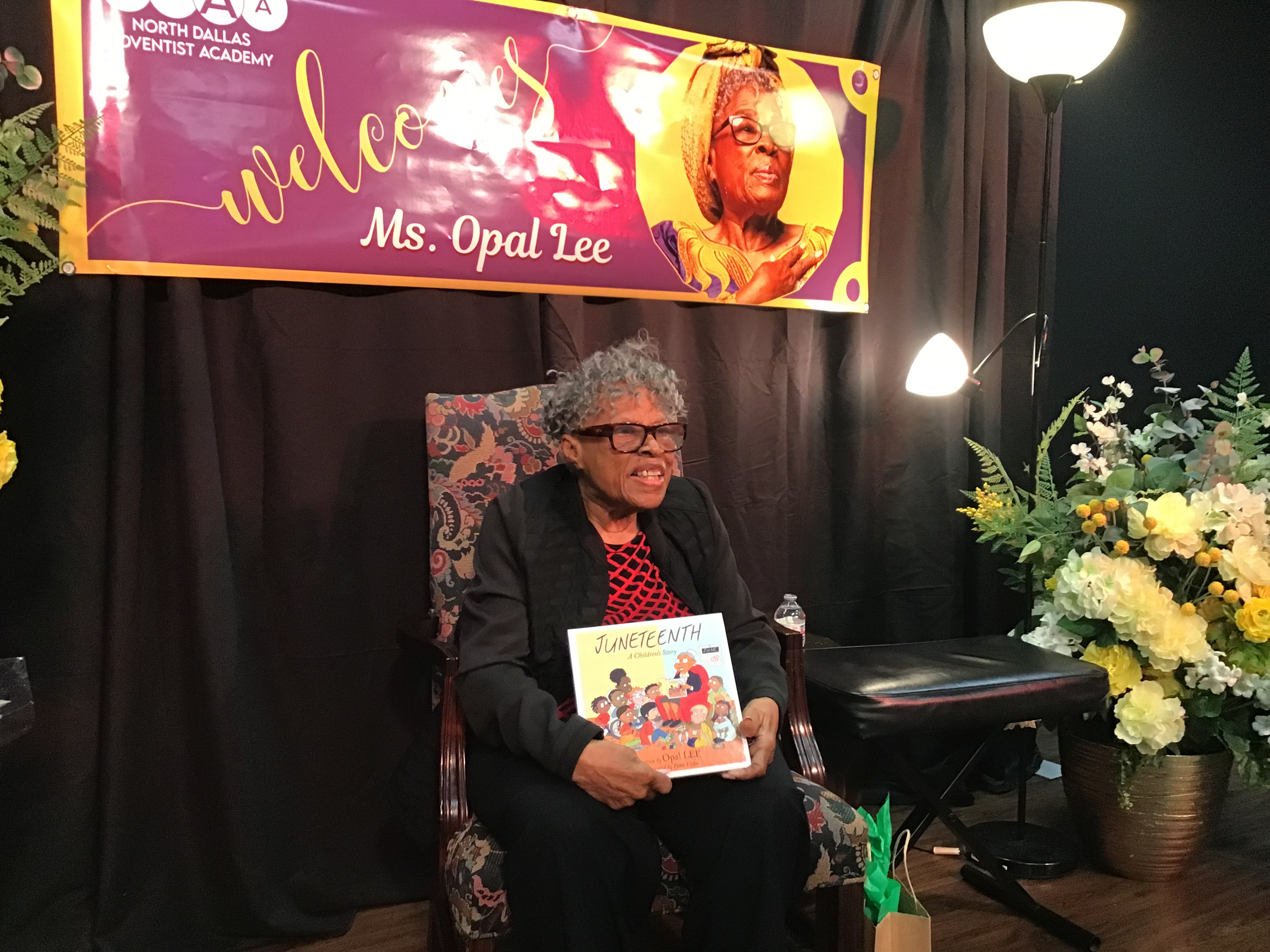
Opal Lee at North Dallas Adventist Academy signing autographs after reading her own book “Juneteenth, a children’s story” to the students.

Lee campaigned for decades to make Juneteenth a federal holiday. She promoted the idea by leading 2.5 miles (4.0 km) walks each year, representing the 2.5 years it took for news of the Emancipation Proclamation to reach Texas. At the age of 89, she conducted a symbolic walk from Fort Worth, from which she departed in September 2016, to Washington, D.C., where she arrived in January 2017. She was hoping to plead the case for a federal holiday directly to President Barack Obama. Lee has not only marched in Texas, but also in Fort Smith and Little Rock, Arkansas; Las Vegas, Nevada; Madison and Milwaukee, Wisconsin; Atlanta, Georgia; Selma, Alabama; and the Carolinas. She promoted a petition for a Juneteenth federal holiday at Change.org; the petition received 1.6 million signatures. She said, "It's going to be a national holiday, I have no doubt about it. My point is let's make it a holiday in my lifetime."

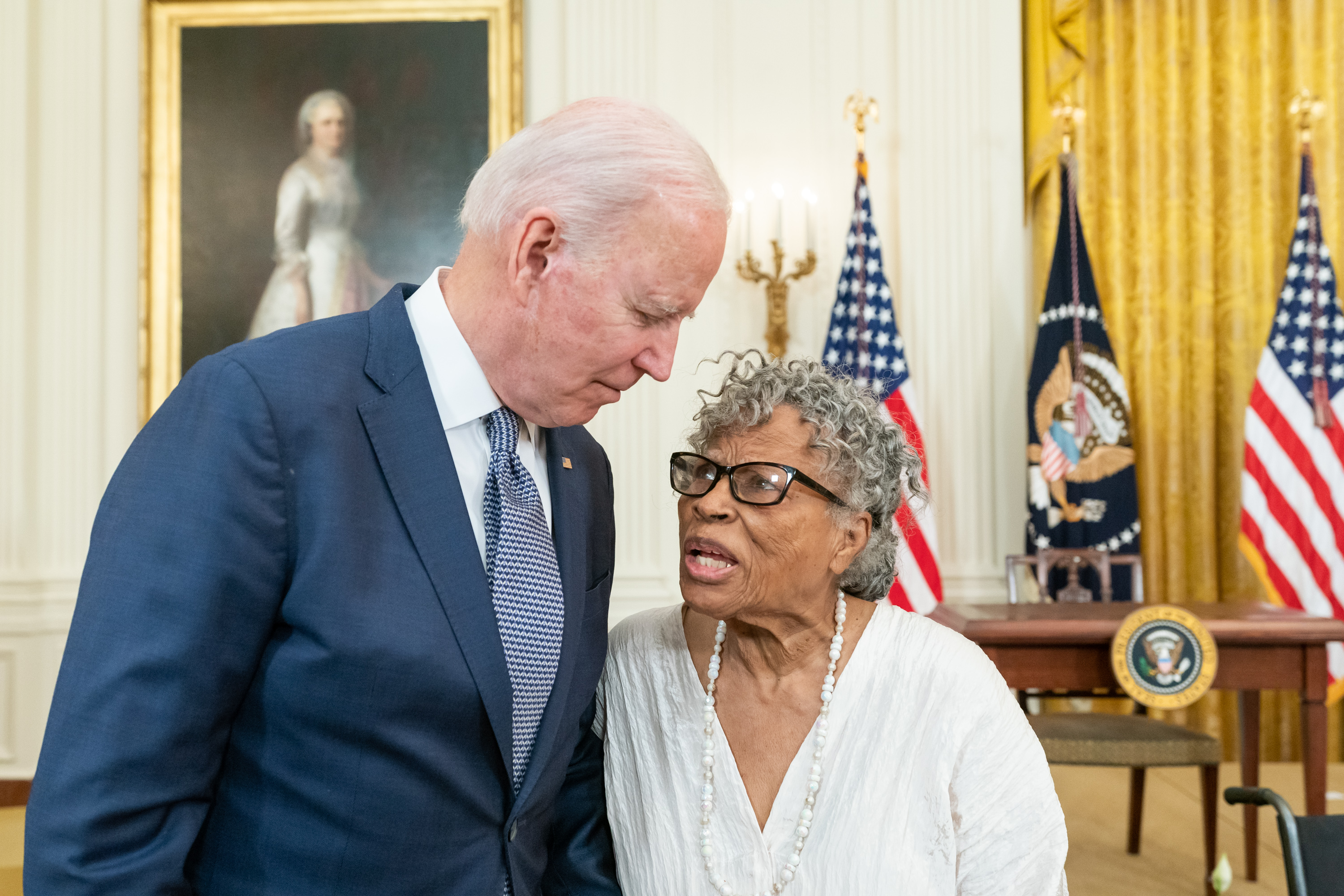
Lee talks with President Joe Biden after the signing of the Juneteenth National Independence Day Act Bill.

In June 2021, at the age of 94, her efforts succeeded as a bill to make Juneteenth a federal holiday was passed by Congress and signed into law by President Joe Biden. She was an honored guest at the bill signing ceremony, receiving the first of many pens Biden used to sign the document. As she sat in the front row, she received a standing ovation and Biden got down on one knee to greet her.

Lee is also a founding board member of Transform 1012 N. Main Street, a coalition of Fort Worth nonprofit and arts organizations working to turn a former Ku Klux Klan auditorium into the Fred Rouse Center and Museum for Arts and Community Healing. Rouse, a Black man, was lynched by a Fort Worth mob in 1921. Transform 1012 N. Main Street was formed in 2019, and announced the acquisition of the building in January 2022.

Lee was named the 2021 "Texan of the Year" by The Dallas Morning News for her activism on behalf of Black Texans. She was also included in the 2021 book Unsung Heroes for operating a food bank, farm, and community garden throughout the COVID-19 pandemic. In 2024, Lee was awarded the Presidential Medal of Freedom by President Joe Biden.

In July 2026, Lee published a memoir titled A Committee of One, which was co-written with Tracey Michae'l Lewis-Giggetts and has a foreword by Nikole Hannah-Jones.

On October 7, 2026 Lee turned 100.

== Media depictions ==
A picture book about Opal Lee titled Opal Lee and What It Means to Be Free was published in 2023 by Thomas Nelson. The book was written by Alice Faye Duncan and illustrated by Keturah A. Bobo.

A biographical graphic novel, First Freedom: The Story of Opal Lee and Juneteenth, was published by Oni Press in 2026. It was written by Angélique Roché and illustrated by Alvin Epps, Bex Glendining, and Millicent Monroe.
