= Ninety Years Without Slumbering =

- The Twilight Zone episode
- Episode no.: Season 5 Episode 12
- Directed by: Roger Kay
- Teleplay by: Richard de Roy
- Based on: "Tick of Time" by Johnson Smith
- Production code: 2615
- Original air date: December 20, 1963

Guest appearances
- Ed Wynn: Sam Forstmann; Carolyn Kearney: Marnie Kirk; James T. Callahan: Doug Kirk; William Sargent: Dr. Mel Avery; Carol Byron: Carol Chase; Dick Wilson: Mover #1; Chuck Hicks: Mover #2; John Pickard: Police Officer

Episode chronology
← Previous "A Short Drink from a Certain Fountain"	Next → "Ring-a-Ding Girl"
- The Twilight Zone (1959 TV series) (season 5)

"Ninety Years Without Slumbering" is episode 132 of the American television anthology series The Twilight Zone. The title comes from the lyrics of the song "My Grandfather's Clock", which is sung or played throughout the episode as a recurring motif. As in the song, main character Sam Forstmann (played by Ed Wynn) believes his life is tied to his clock's ticking.

== Opening narration ==
Each man measures his time; some with hope, some with joy, some with fear. But Sam Forstmann measures his allotted time by a grandfather's clock, a unique mechanism whose pendulum swings between life and death, a very special clock that keeps a special kind of time—in the Twilight Zone.

== Plot ==
Sam Forstmann is an old man who spends all of his time working on his grandfather clock, upsetting his pregnant granddaughter and her husband, with whom he resides. They press him into speaking with a psychiatrist friend of theirs. Sam confides in the psychiatrist that his father gave him the clock on the day he was born, and that he will die if it stops ticking. The psychiatrist thinks this belief is merely a subconscious rationalization of Sam's obsession with the clock and advises him to sell it. In an effort to appease his family, Sam puts the clock up for sale. However, when a neighbor expresses interest in it, he offers to let her have it with payment indefinitely deferred and come by every two days to maintain it.

Two weeks after he sells the clock, the new owners go on vacation for the weekend, so Sam cannot wind the clock. Desperate, he tries breaking into the house, but a passing policeman is alerted by the sound of the window shattering and takes him back home. There he lies weakly in bed and resigns himself to death. The clock stops, and his "spirit" appears, informing him "It's time to go." He chooses to stop believing in the clock's power, declaring instead that he wants to live to see his great-grandchild grow up. He, therefore, continues to live (and the "spirit" vanishes).

The next morning, he tells his expectant granddaughter, "When that clock died, I was born again."

== Closing narration ==
Clocks are made by men, God creates time. No man can prolong his allotted hours, he can only live them to the fullest—in this world or in the Twilight Zone.

== Production notes ==
Ninety Years Without Slumbering was a drastic reworking of an original script by George Clayton Johnson, Tick of Time. Most notably, in Tick of Time the main character did indeed die when the clock stopped. Johnson disapproved of the changes made to his story, especially Sam Forstmann's anticlimactic confrontation with his own ghost: "It makes the whole plot trivial. In order to get involved with Sam Forstmann's issues, you've got to believe in those issues. So if Sam himself suddenly stops believing in them, it's a cheat." Accordingly, Johnson was credited onscreen under a pseudonym.

Marc Scott Zicree, author of The Twilight Zone Companion, was similarly appalled by the "inept" rewriting of Tick of Time as 90 Years Without Slumbering, particularly the climax: "Imagine: Sam Forstmann has fanatically clung to his beliefs, however misguided, in the face of all logic to the contrary; he has proclaimed said beliefs to a psychiatrist, even resorted to breaking and entering to keep the clock ticking...and what does he do at the last possible moment? Blithely talk himself out of his most strongly-held conviction of seven-and-a-half decades!"

This episode was Bernard Herrmann's final score for the series.
