= A Short Drink from a Certain Fountain =

- The Twilight Zone episode
- Episode no.: Season 5 Episode 11
- Directed by: Bernard Girard
- Story by: Lou Holtz
- Teleplay by: Rod Serling
- Production code: 2614
- Original air date: December 13, 1963

Guest appearances
- Patrick O'Neal: Harmon Gordon; Ruta Lee: Flora Gordon; Walter Brooke: Dr. Raymond Gordon

Episode chronology
← Previous "The 7th Is Made Up of Phantoms"	Next → "Ninety Years Without Slumbering"
- The Twilight Zone (1959 TV series) (season 5)

"A Short Drink from a Certain Fountain" is an episode of the American television anthology series The Twilight Zone. In this episode, a scientist gives his brother an experimental youth serum in order to save his marriage to a much younger woman. The episode's title refers to the mythical Fountain of Youth.

== Opening narration ==
Picture of an aging man who leads his life, as Thoreau said, 'in quiet desperation.' Because Harmon Gordon is enslaved by a love affair with a wife forty years his junior. Because of this, he runs when he should walk. He surrenders when simple pride dictates a stand. He pines away for the lost morning of his life when he should be enjoying the evening. In short, Mr. Harmon Gordon seeks a fountain of youth, and who's to say he won't find it? This happens to be the Twilight Zone.

== Plot ==
Harmon Gordon, a wealthy old man married to a much younger woman named Flora, is exhausted by his wife's youthful and selfish lifestyle. Seeking to keep up the pace, he asks his scientist brother Raymond to inject him with an experimental youth serum. Raymond firmly refuses at first, saying that the serum has had mixed results with laboratory animals and will not be ready for human trials without decades of refinement. Moreover, he abhors Flora for her callous treatment of his brother and is not enthusiastic about any step to strengthen their marriage. When Harmon suggests he will commit suicide rather than lose Flora, Raymond reluctantly agrees to administer the serum.

Per his instructions, Harmon rests after taking the serum. He later wakens to find himself a young man, to Flora's surprised delight. Before Harmon can enjoy his new youth however, the regression continues until he eventually becomes a toddler hours later. Flora tries to leave, but Raymond insists she must stay and raise the infant Harmon or be cut off from Harmon's fortune, threatening legal action against her should she disobey. Finding a stroke of poetic justice in what has happened, Raymond points out that by the time Harmon has regained adulthood, his position with Flora will be reversed, with her being old.

== Closing narration ==
It happens to be a fact: as one gets older, one does get wiser. If you don't believe it, ask Flora. Ask her any day of the ensuing weeks of her life, as she takes notes during the coming years and realizes that the worm has turned: youth has taken over. It's simply the way the calendar crumbles...in the Twilight Zone.

== Production ==
Initially, the Raymond Gordon character was to be a typical family physician. Disturbed by the character's willingness to experiment on a fellow human (Harmon, his brother), CBS asked that his occupation be changed to that of a research scientist. Serling complied.

The opening narration uses an allusion to the poet Henry Thoreau, a poet, essayist, and philosopher who spoke extensively on aging, maturity, and romantic themes—all of which feature extensively in the narrative.

This episode (because of a lawsuit filed by someone claiming they had the idea for the story first) was not included in the Twilight Zone syndication package until 1984. When this and other long unseen episodes became available (including "Miniature"), a series of short introductions were shot featuring commentary from the cast and crew of the original episodes. In the segment with Patrick O'Neal for this episode, O'Neal remarked on how accurately the show's makeup effects artists had aged him, as he now very closely resembled his older appearance in this episode. O'Neal was only eight years older than Ruta Lee, who played the much younger Flora.

== Sources ==
- DeVoe, Bill. (2008). Trivia from The Twilight Zone. Albany, GA: Bear Manor Media. ISBN 978-1-59393-136-0
- Grams, Martin. (2008). The Twilight Zone: Unlocking the Door to a Television Classic. Churchville, MD: OTR Publishing. ISBN 978-0-9703310-9-0
- Zicree, Marc Scott: The Twilight Zone Companion. Sillman-James Press, 1982 (second edition)
