= Heroines of Jericho =

African American Masonic organisation

Heroines of Jericho is an organization in Prince Hall Freemasonry, founded as an auxiliary organization to Holy Royal Arch Masons. Initially, only the wives, daughters, mothers, widows, and sisters of Royal Arch Masons were allowed. The organization has no national body and operates as separate state Grand Courts with subordinate local courts. Moses Dickson called the degrees the "oldest and most perfect of all the Female Degrees." The name comes the Bible as a reference to the Woman of Jericho, Rahab, who protected her family from harm by saving two Israelites. In their gratitude, they told her to hang a red cord from her house to mark her family as protected.

== Degrees and Symbolism ==
The Heroines of Jericho contain three degrees in the subsequent order: the Master Mason's Daughter, the True Kinsman, and the Heroine of Jericho. Emblems of the order include the Scarlet Cord, the Sheaf of Wheat, and the Three-Tiered Ark and the three colors are red, white, and blue. These emblems and colors are represented in the regalia worn by the Heroines of Jericho.

== State Grand Courts ==
The Grand Court of Michigan organized on May 25, 1874. In Jacksonville, Florida, the Grand Court of Florida was formed in January 1882. Early courts in Texas, including Sarah Court, No. 1, Rebecca Court, No. 2, St. Mary Court, No.3, Victoria Court, No. 4, and Elizabeth Court, No. 5, formed in the late nineteenth century.

== Members ==
- Vivian Osborne Marsh
- Lenora Rolla
- Lillian B. Horace
- Lucy A. Delaney
