= North Dallas Adventist Academy =

Christian Adventist K-12 school in Richardson, Texas

Coordinates: 32.938533°N 96.733080°W

North Dallas Adventist Academy (NDAA)
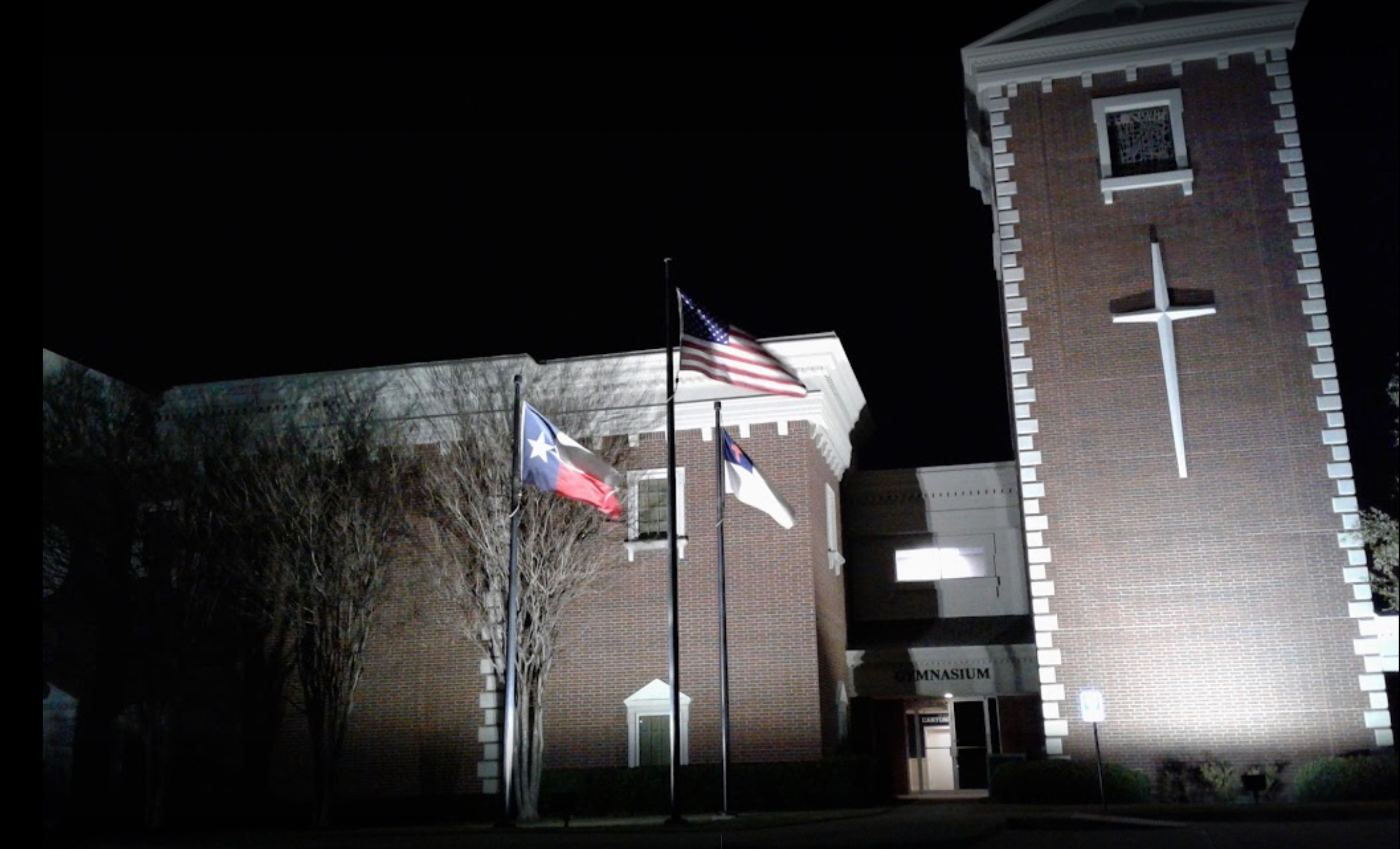
- North Dallas Adventist Academy in February 2017.
- 2800 Custer Pkwy, Richardson, TX 75080; Dallas County; United States

Information
- Former name: Richardson Adventist School (RAS)
- School type: Tuition, K-12 Private School
- Motto: Honor, Inspire, Support
- Religious affiliation: Protestant
- Denomination: Seventh-day Adventist Church
- Established: c. 1984
- Principal: Stephan Gray
- Chaplain: Pastor Sunny Kim
- Staff: 12
- Faculty: 14
- Grades: K-12
- Colors: Green, White, Black
- Athletics: Yes; Soccer, Basketball, Volleyball
- Teams: Sentinels
- Website: https://www.ndaacademy.org/
- Last updated: August 27, 2026

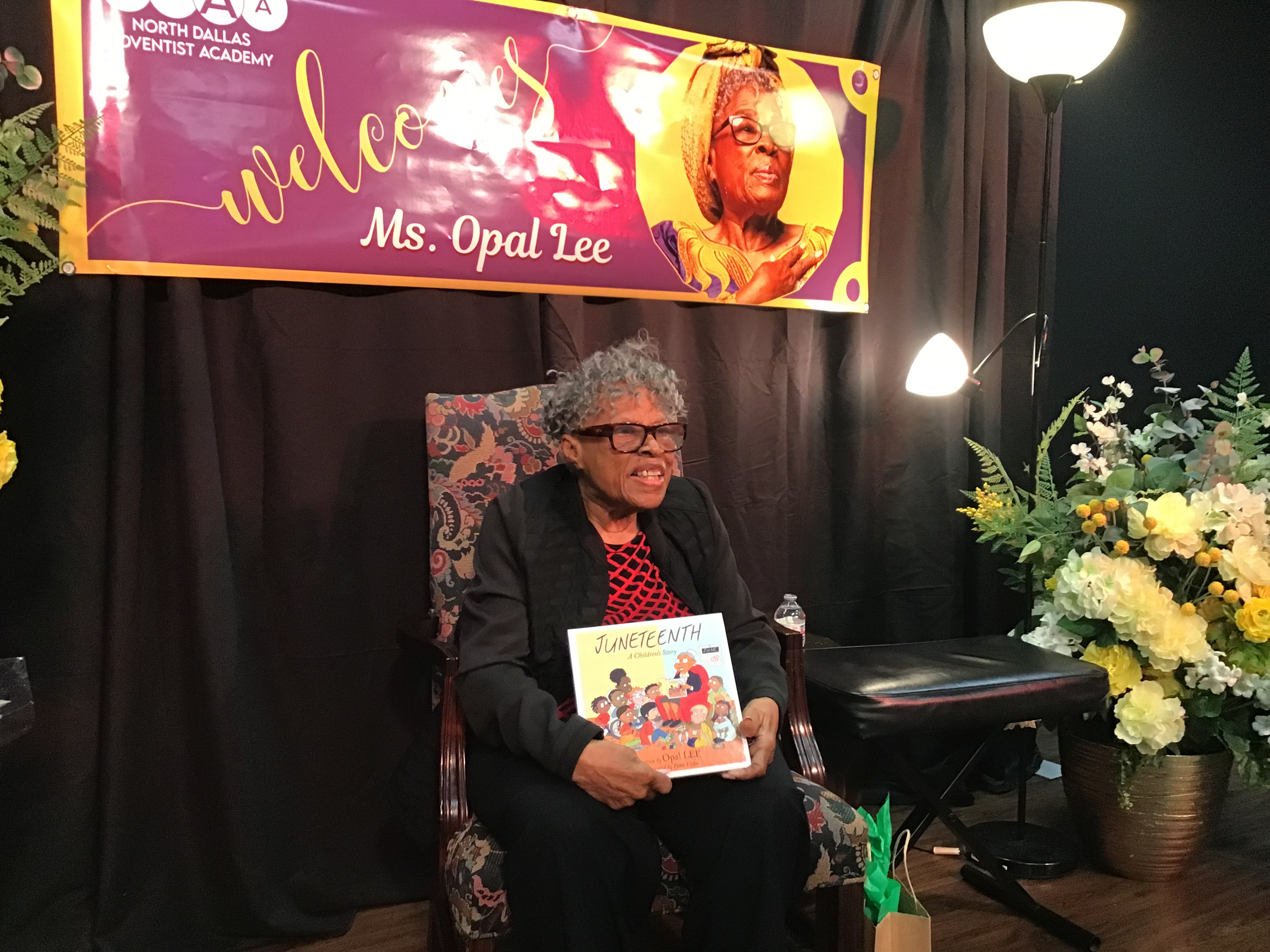
Opal Lee at North Dallas Adventist Academy signing autographs after reading her own book to the students.

North Dallas Adventist Academy (NDAA) is a Christian Adventist K-12 school in Richardson, Texas. It was founded as the Richardson Adventist School (RAS) at Richardson Seventh Day Adventist Church in 1984. The school in its current form opened in August 2017 at former Canyon Creek Academy (CCA).
