= Lillian B. Horace =

American novelist

Lillian Bertha Jones Horace
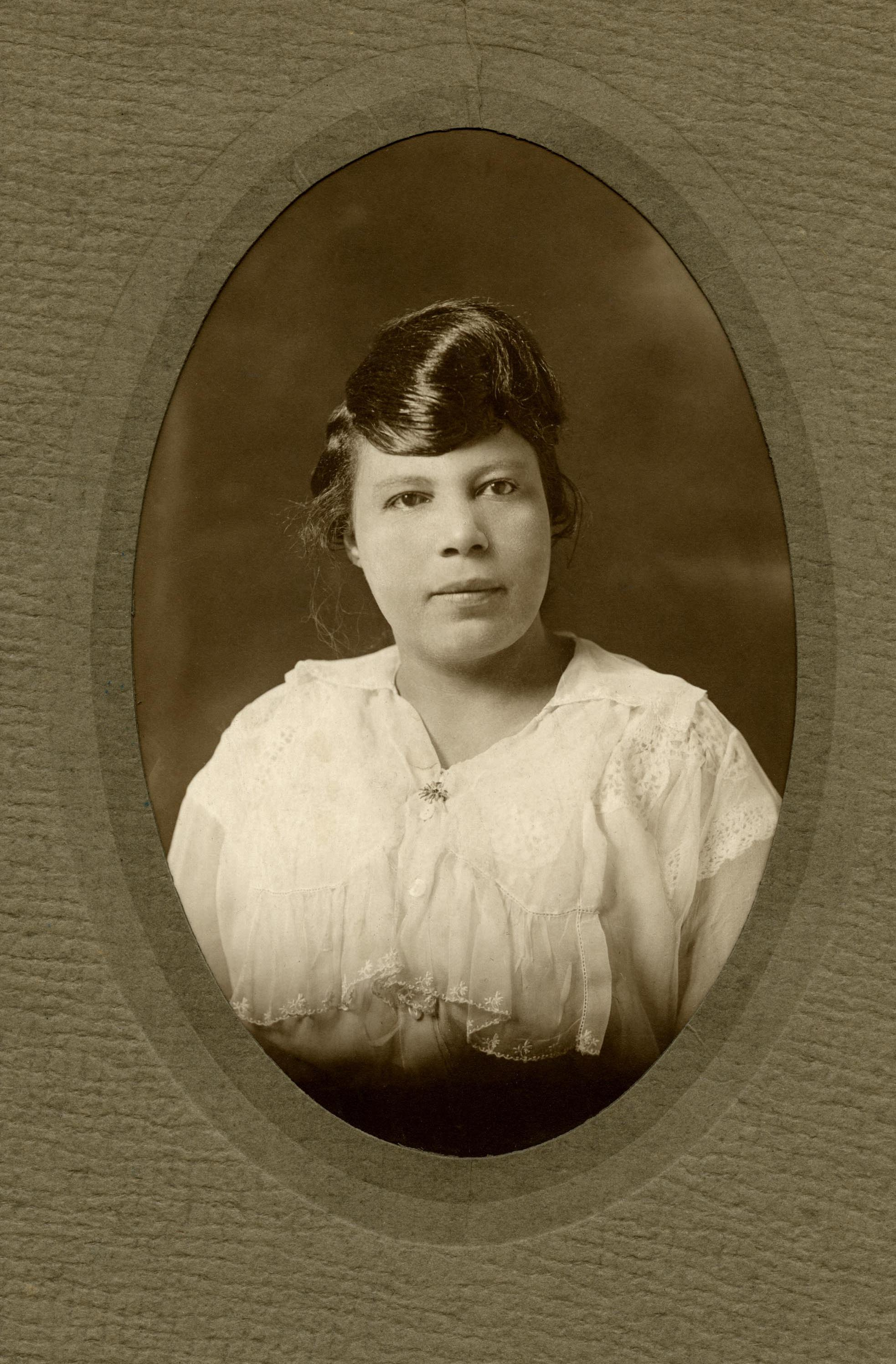
- 1916 portrait of Lillian B. Horace by Frank Leffler
- Born: April 29, 1880; Jefferson, Texas
- Died: August 1, 1965 (aged 85)
- Education: Simmons College (BA); University of Chicago (MA)
- Occupation: Writer
- Organization(s): Zeta Phi Beta Sorority, Progressive Woman's Club, Alphin Charity and Literary Arts Club
- Spouse: David Jones (married 1899–1919) Joseph Gentry Horace (married 1930–1946)

Lillian Bertha Jones Horace (née Amstead; April 29, 1880 – August 1, 1965) was an African American author, educator, and librarian from Fort Worth, Texas, best known for her novels Five Generations Hence (1916), Crowned with Glory and Honor, and Angie Brown. These are the earliest novels on record written by an African-American woman from Texas. Horace married and divorced twice, and continued to teach, travel and write throughout her life. At the time of her retirement, she had been an educator for over thirty years.

== Biography ==
=== Early life and education ===
Lillian Bertha Amstead (or Armistead) was born April 29, 1880, in Jefferson, Texas, to Thomas Amstead (or Armistead) and Macey Ackard Matthews; she also had one sister, Etta. The family moved to Fort Worth when Lillian was two years old. Thomas failed to support them financially, so the girls grew up helping their mother make ends meet. A self-described "dreamy" and "mystical" child, Lillian attended the East Ninth Street Colored School (renamed I.M. Terrell High School in 1921), the first free public school in Fort Worth, and Mt. Gilead Baptist Church. She attended several colleges and universities, including historically black colleges in the Jim Crow south. In 1898-99, Lillian attended Bishop College, a historically black college founded by the Baptist Home Mission Society in Marshall, Texas, which she credited with her commitment to the Baptist faith. Lillian attended the Dallas Summer Normal Institute, a segregated teacher education program, in 1905. In 1914, she enrolled at Prairie View State Normal and Industrial College (now Prairie View A&M University) and graduated valedictorian in a class of seventy-four. Returning to Fort Worth to teach during the school year, Lillian attended summer courses at the University of Chicago in 1917, 1918, 1919, 1928, and 1940; at the University of Colorado Boulder in 1920; and at Columbia University in 1924. In 1920–1921, she attended Simmons College in Louisville, Kentucky, where she earned her bachelor's degree in 1922. While at Simmons College, she held the position of Dean of Women. Jones would later return to the University of Chicago in 1940 to study for a master's degree in Library Science.

=== Career ===
After attending university, Horace moved back to the South and married David Jones, the son of her pastor Reverend Prince Jones. For the first few years of their marriage, they lived with his family in Denton. During this time, she studied for and passed her teaching exams, and took up her first teaching position in 1901 at a school in the rural community of Parvin in Denton County, Texas. The following year, she was named principal of the Handley Colored School, a one-room school in the Handley community east of Fort Worth. In 1911, Lillian returned to I.M. Terrell High School to teach English. During her long teaching career at I.M. Terrell, she established the school's journalism and drama departments, started a School Newspaper at I. M. Terrell called Terrellife, and formed the school's first library using donations from parents. For many years, she served as the school's dean of girls.

Though teaching was her career, Lillian's greatest wish was "to write a book worth reading by an intelligent person, not necessarily [her] friend." In 1916, Lillian self-published her first book of utopian fiction, Five Generations Hence, the first known novel by an African-American woman in Texas. The plot of the migration narrative, centering on fictional African-American educator Grace Noble, presents African-American women as heroines and the return of black Americans to Africa as a "plausible solution to the obstacles facing blacks in the South", five generations after their enslavement and transport to the Americas. The book was not widely distributed, but came to scholars' attention in 1995 when it was excerpted in Daring to Dream: Utopian Stories by United States Women, 1836-1919.

In 1938, Lillian began writing a biography of Dr. Lacey Kirk Williams, the minister of Chicago's Olivet Baptist Church, then the largest church in the United States with a congregation of 12,000. He had been a minister at Lillian's own Mt. Gilead Baptist Church in Fort Worth prior to moving to Chicago. Williams was killed in a plane crash in 1940, and although Lillian finished the book the following year, power struggles within the National Baptist Convention prevented distribution of the book until 1964, when it gained the attention of Martin Luther King Jr. "Crowned with Glory and Honor": The Life of Rev. Lacey Kirk Williams was published posthumously in 1978.

Lillian's second novel, Angie Brown, was written while traveling between Texas and California after her divorce from her second husband. Rather than presenting emigration to Africa as a solution to American racial struggles, Angie Brown focuses on the women's shared experience and envisions "cooperation between black and white women". Angie Brown: A Jim Crow Romance was published posthumously in 2017.

=== Personal life ===
Lillian B. Horace was a member of the Texas Commission on Interracial Cooperation, Zeta Phi Beta sorority, Alphin Art & Charity Club, Progressive Women's Club, Women's Council of Mt. Gilead, Heroines of Jericho, and Prince Hall Order of the Eastern Star; she also served as chaplain of the National Association of Colored Women's Clubs. She was also involved with the Texas Library Association and the National PTA. As a local civic leader and longtime educator at the "separate but superior" I.M. Terrell High School, Lillian was a significant influence on local African American women like educator Hazel Harvey Peace and civil rights activist Lulu B. White.

Both of Lillian's marriages ended in divorce, strained by her professional and personal ambitions. Lillian married David Jones, the son of her pastor at Mt. Gilead Baptist Church, in 1900; the couple divorced in 1919. She married Joseph Gentry Horace, a native of the small East Texas town of Groveton, in 1930. A recent widower seven years younger than Lillian, J. Gentry was an employee at Swift & Co. in the Fort Worth Stockyards whom she probably met at church. With her support, he enrolled in the Bishop College seminary in 1935. The couple relocated to the Chicago area when he transferred to Northern Seminary five years later, earning his bachelor's degree in 1942 and master's degree in theology in 1943. J. Gentry became a minister at the Second Baptist Church of Evanston, Illinois; contrary to his congregation's expectations of a minister's wife, Lillian divided her time between Fort Worth and Evanston, continuing to teach at I.M. Terrell during the school year. After his mistress's husband exposed J. Gentry's longstanding affair with a local woman, Portia Cooke, he moved to another church and Lillian returned to Fort Worth after some time spent traveling in the west of the country. Their divorce was finalized in 1946. J. Gentry subsequently married Cooke in 1951.

Lillian had no children with Jones or Horace. She died of heart disease at a Fort Worth nursing home on August 6, 1965, and was buried at Old Trinity Cemetery, the African-American section of Fort Worth's historic Oakwood Cemetery. Her funeral was held on August 9, 1965. Those in attendance included members of the many organizations Horace was a part of, including the Zeta Phi Beta sorority, Heroines of Jericho, Progressive Woman's Club, Viola Court No. 250 and Alphin Charity and Literary Arts Club.

== Literary works ==
=== Literary legacy ===
Lillian Bertha Jones Horace's literary works were lost for many decades until Karen Kossie-Chernyshev, a professor at Texas Southern University, located her diary and novels at Fort Worth Public Library. She was one of the only African American women writers working in the South during the 1940s. Scholars have argued that the category of Southern Literature has very few works by Black authors. Historians have viewed Horace's work as a way to widen this category. During the early to mid 1900s, the South upheld Jim Crow Laws. As an African American woman, Horace's freedom was limited under these laws which Dr. Veronica Watson argues influenced her work. In the diaries found by Kossie-Chernyshev, she wrote about everything from politics and war to her personal life. Her entries included some personal experiences with what she considered to be discrimination. For example, after a white woman stole shoes from her while she was at the store, and an employee refused to help her, Horace wrote:

The floorwalker, Mr. Weed, hurts my feelings. I lie awake and suffer much of the night. I want to say things to him not vulgar things but things to show how inconsiderate he was in a crisis. Shoes gone-- money and coupon "17"--but I suffer only for the insult I received. The first time I feel unpatriotic—just a dark face makes you the recipient of any insult.

Themes of oppression and discrimination are present in her novels as well. Horace, similarly to Zora Neale Hurston and Langston Hughes, used her writing to expose and critique white supremacy. She is one of the few African American Women to do so during this time period. Horace's work adds to the knowledge scholars have of the ways in which Black female authors engaged with the concept of whiteness. Other influences on her work include Richard Wright's autobiography Black Boy. She wrote many entries in her diary about it in which she complimented his writing style. However, she also critiqued his work for its portrayal of African Americans, which she thought to be too negative. Throughout her life, Horace wrote at least three novels. These include Five Generations Hence, Crowned with Glory and Honor, and Angie Brown. Although Horace had a lengthy and successful teaching career, from a young age she desired to write. She did not achieve much recognition for her writing during her life, but after her novels were rediscovered, several essays were written which focus on her work. They were then compiled in the book Recovering Five Generations Hence: The Life and Writing of Lillian Jones Horace, which includes her novel Five Generations Hence.

=== Five Generations Hence ===
Five Generations Hence, written in 1916, was Horace's first novel, which she self-published due to her work being rejected many times. She co-owned the publishing company that she used, Dotson Publishing Co. This novel was lost for many years until Carol Kessler included an excerpt of it in her novel Daring to Dream, written in 1996. Horace's is the first known utopian novel written by an African American. Both of the protagonists of this novel, Grace Noble, a teacher, and Violet Gray, a missionary, are Black Women. Gray describes herself as the "advance guard of a mighty nation" while Noble is characterized as "truest and best type." By centering her story around Black Female characters, some of whom were intellectuals, Horace provided a picture of black womanhood that challenged stereotypes of black women, including the idea that they were promiscuous and foul-mouthed. Her premise puts forth emigrating to Africa as a solution to the discrimination faced by black people in the United States.

=== Crowned with Glory and Honor ===
Crowned with Glory and Honor (written in 1943) is a biography of Reverend Lacey Kirk Williams, a prominent pastor and president of the National Baptist Convention (NBC), 1922–1940. Reverend Williams died just as Horace was finishing this novel, which created tension between leaders of the NBC. At this time, Horace was unable to convince them to publish the Reverend's biography. However, many years later at a meeting of the Progressive National Baptists Convention Inc. (PBC) Horace shared her novel. In 1978, thirteen years after Horace's death, a leader of the PBC, L. Vencheal Booth, published her work.

=== Angie Brown ===
Angie Brown, written in 1949, was Horace's third novel. She unsuccessfully attempted to have it published by New York-based publisher Lemuel L. Foster. This novel includes themes of interracial cooperation, focusing specifically on black and white women. The protagonist, Angie Brown, is an African American woman who experiences the death of her infant soon after her husband leaves her. One of the only interns who would see Black patients at a nearby segregated hospital did not return from an extended lunch in time to treat her child. A devastated Angie begins a journey that takes her far away from home where she finds support from both black and white women. In turn, she is a positive influence on those around her.
