= Lenora Rolla Heritage Center Museum =

Coordinates: 32°44′04″N 97°18′53″W

The Lenora Rolla Heritage Center Museum is a museum in the Historic Southside neighborhood in Fort Worth, Texas that focuses on the history of African Americans in Tarrant County and throughout Texas. It is named for Lenora Rolla who initially raised money to purchase the building and start the museum in 1979. It is operated in the historic Boone House and open by appointment with the Tarrant County Black Historical and Genealogical Society.

== See also ==
- History of the African Americans in Dallas-Fort Worth
