= Hazel Harvey Peace =

American educator, activist, and humanitarian

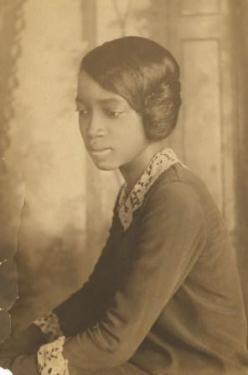
Hazel Harvey Peace, circa 1919

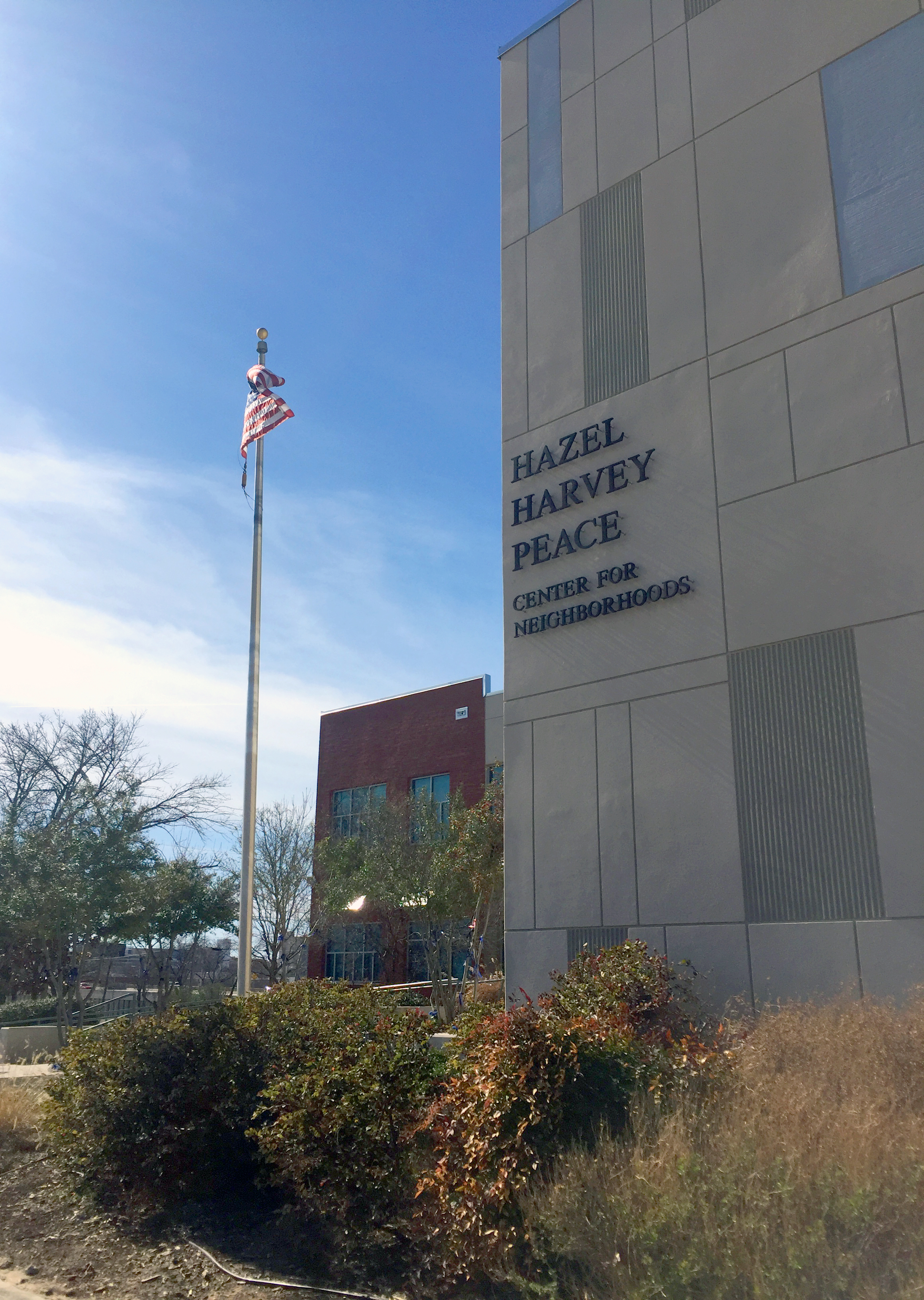
View of the east side of the Hazel Harvey Peace Center for Neighborhoods building in Fort Worth, Texas

Hazel Bernice Harvey Peace (August 4, 1907 – June 8, 2008) was an African-American educator, activist, and humanitarian in Fort Worth, Texas. The namesake of an elementary school, municipal building, and library youth center in Fort Worth, Peace overcame racial segregation to provide opportunities for African Americans, youth, and women in Fort Worth, Dallas, and throughout the state of Texas.

== Early life and education ==
Hazel Bernice Harvey Peace was born August 4, 1907, in Waco, Texas, to Allen H. and Georgia Mason Harvey; the family moved to Fort Worth three months later. Peace's father was a Pullman porter on the Missouri and Pacific Railroad, and her mother was a homemaker who also owned a children's clothing shop. An only child and considered a prodigy, Peace was reading at the age of four. She attended James E. Guinn Elementary School through sixth grade, then went to high school at the Fort Worth Colored School, graduating at the age of thirteen. An active reader, she spent much of her time at Fort Worth's segregated Carnegie Public Library, where she could check out books, but not stay and read them.

She attended Howard University, a historically black university in Washington, D.C., where she became a member of Alpha Kappa Alpha, the first black sorority in the United States. Graduating in 1923, Peace returned to Fort Worth to teach at her alma mater, by then renamed I.M. Terrell High School, while still a teenager herself. Between school years, she attended summer classes at Columbia University in New York, living at the YWCA in Harlem during the height of the Harlem Renaissance. After earning her master's degree from Columbia, she continued her postgraduate education by taking summer courses at the University of Wisconsin, Vassar College, Hampton University, and Atlanta University.

== Career ==
=== "Mama Hazel" ===
Hazel Harvey married contractor Joe Peace (1908–1959), a graduate of the Tuskegee Institute, in 1938. She never dropped her maiden name, always using her full name, Hazel Harvey Peace. The couple had no children, but she was nicknamed "Mama Hazel" by her students, whom she considered family.

Peace was known as the "matriarch" of I.M. Terrell High School, working there from 1924 until it was closed in 1972 due to court-ordered desegregation. She spent nearly 50 years at the school, first as a teacher, then as counselor, dean of girls, and, finally, vice principal. She taught whatever subject was needed, including English, drama, debate, and history. Peace launched a children's theater at I.M. Terrell, where kids from local black elementary schools could attend plays, as well as a debate club. Due in part to Peace's tireless efforts to make up for the segregated school's lack of resources, I.M. Terrell became known for the quality of its college-prep curriculum and for producing most of Fort Worth's black middle class. Known locally as a "monument to black accomplishment," jazz musician Ornette Coleman, Texas state legislator Reby Cary, Harvard professor James Cash, Jr., and legendary Fort Worth journalist Bob Ray Sanders are among Peace's former students.

=== College administrator ===
After retiring from I.M. Terrell, Peace worked in administrative positions at Bishop College and Paul Quinn College in Dallas, Huston-Tillotson College in Austin, and Prairie View A&M University in Prairie View, Texas. She retired from education in 1981.

=== Volunteer work ===
Peace worked as a volunteer in the evenings at Fort Worth's John Peter Smith Hospital while she was also teaching at I.M. Terrell, and campaigned for “equalization” of black and white teachers’ salaries. After her retirement, she became more active in the community, as an advocate for youth, women, and the homeless. She served on the Fort Worth Parks and Recreation Advisory Board, Fort Worth Public Library Advisory Council, the board of the Women's Center of Tarrant County, the United Way, the Fort Worth chapter of the NAACP, YWCA, and the reading program at Bethlehem Community Center in Fort Worth. She was the chair of the Mayor's Task Force on Housing, the Near Southeast Citizens Commission, and the Near Southside Neighborhood Advisory Council.

== Honors ==
Peace was presented with Fort Worth Human Relations Commission's Humanitarian Award in 1977 and 1985. In 1988, she received the United Way's Hercules Award. In 1987, she was nominated to the Texas Women's Hall of Fame, but ultimately not inducted.

In 1992, Hazel Harvey Peace received an honorary doctorate of humane letters from Texas Wesleyan University, and Fort Worth Public Library's youth center was named after her. In 2001, Peace participated as an Olympic torchbearer in advance of the Salt Lake City winter games. In 2007, the University of North Texas School of Library and Information Science created an endowed professorship in children's library services in Peace's honor, the first in Texas to be named after an African American woman.

== Death and legacy ==
The Fort Worth Public Library held a public celebration for Peace's 100th birthday in 2007. She died on June 8, 2008, at the age of 100 and was buried alongside her husband at Cedar Hill Memorial Park in Arlington, Texas.

Peace made a lasting impact on Fort Worth and the educational community, leaving the proceeds of her estate to Howard University, Texas Wesleyan University, the Fort Worth Public Library Foundation, and Our Mother of Mercy Catholic Elementary School. Peace's popularity was such that hers was the first public black funeral in Fort Worth, and memorials to Hazel Harvey Peace were entered into the remarks of the U.S. House of Representatives and Congressional Record by U.S. Representatives Michael Burgess and Kay Granger.

In 2009, the City of Fort Worth named its newest municipal building, the Hazel Harvey Peace Center for Neighborhoods, in honor of this local neighborhood advocate. In 2010, Fort Worth ISD opened the Hazel Harvey Peace Elementary School in southwest Fort Worth.
