= Skratch (pinstripe artist and fabricator) =

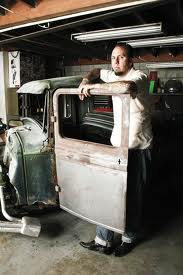

Background information
- Born: May 26, 1972 (age 53)
- Origin: Fort Worth, Texas, U.S.
- Occupations: Pinstripe artist, metal fabricator, hot rod builder
- Website: www.skratchsgarage.com

Skratch (born May 26, 1972) is an American pinstripe artist and metal fabricator best known for his work on the TV shows Overhaulin' and Hot Rod TV.

== Early years ==
The grandson of an Oklahoma moonshine runner and the son of a 1950s pinstriper, Skratch started working on hot rods at age 16 in Fort Worth, Texas. Soon he had established a money-making business buying and selling used Camaro parts locally. He soon started buying cars outside the city, fixing them up and selling them for profit. By the age of 20, he had rented his first shop and began modding 1950s Oldsmobiles and Chevrolets. After several years of struggling to make ends meet, Skratch shut down the shop. At age 26, he moved to the West Coast to work in the car world there. Soon his pinstriping talents were noticed by builders at events, and his new career in L.A. began.

== Skratch's Garage ==
As Skratch began to fabricate and pinstripe for various owners and builders, his following started to build. His work was featured in national magazines including Rod & Custom, Ol' Skool Rodz, Lowrider Magazine, and Burnout Magazine. He striped everything from hot rods and lowriders to choppers and refrigerators. At Skratch's Garage in Sun Valley, California, he worked on a growing list of metal fabrication projects and custom builds.

== TV appearances ==
In 2004, Skratch landed a reoccurring role as "the striper" on TLC's hit car makeover show Overhaulin'. The show's star Chip Foose was so impressed with his striping and fabrication skills that Skratch was continuously invited back into 2007's season 5.

The producers of Overhaulin' invited Skratch to star in an episode of Hot Rod TV on ESPN2. The "Head Skratcher" episode follows Skratch as he marries a Model A Roadster with a '58 Cadillac, using nothing but parts he acquires in junkyards and through the classifieds. Starting with a drawing on a napkin, he immerses himself in building "the classic American hot rod." The episode stresses his talents to unachievable heights while the cameras roll, and sleep becomes a distant memory as he bounces between the Head Skratcher, striping shows in Japan and Germany, and season 5 of Overhaulin'. The episode debuted in September, and became the highest rated episode in the entire 20-episode season.

== Bell Helmets ==
In 2010, Bell Helmets asked Skratch to apply his signature painting and striping abilities to their new Bell Custom 500 three-quarter helmet. This led to other helmet jobs.
