= Lenora Rolla =

African-American activist and historian

Lenora Rolla and Lyndon B. Johnson in the 1960s

Lenora Rolla (March 4, 1904 – June 29, 2001) was an activist, businesswoman, educator, and historian. The granddaughter of former slaves who grew up in poverty, Rolla became a civil rights leader and community activist in the Dallas–Fort Worth metroplex. In 1977, she founded the Tarrant County Black Historical and Genealogical Society, whose history museum is named in honor of Rolla.

== Early life and education ==
Lenora Rolla (née Butler) was born March 4, 1904, near the towns of Palestine and Neches in rural East Texas, and raised by her grandparents in Neches until the age of five. Her grandfather, William Hall, was a former slave from Mississippi; her grandmother, also born into slavery, had been given as a wedding gift to a white couple who came to Texas from South Carolina. Lenora's father was a farmer and her mother, Amanda Hall, worked as a maid in Fort Worth, sending money back home to the family. Lenora spent the summers in Fort Worth with her mother until she moved there permanently in 1909, living in servants' quarters and helping her mother with laundry and ironing.

Rolla attended the Cooper Street School in Trezevant Hill, a historic African-American community in what is now Fort Worth's hospital district, and was baptized at Southside Baptist Church on Easter Sunday in 1916. In 1921, she graduated from the famous I.M. Terrell High School, the first public school for blacks in Fort Worth. She continued to work there as a substitute teacher, taking correspondence classes at historically black Prairie View A&M College and Bishop College. She completed a mathematics degree at Alcorn College in Mississippi, and attended Howard University in Washington, D.C., in the 1940s.

== Career ==
Rolla supported herself by taking in sewing and working at her uncle's insurance business, an industry in which she worked through the 1920s and 1930s. During the Great Depression, she worked as a proofreader at the Fort Worth Mind, a local African-American newspaper. She spent most of the 1940s in Washington, D.C., working in the settlement house movement, an anti-poverty social movement that was still subject to racial segregation. She had the opportunity to hear First Lady Eleanor Roosevelt speak at Howard University and worked with civil rights activist Mary McLeod Bethune, who as Director of Negro Affairs had an office in the White House during the Roosevelt administration. During World War II, Rolla worked as the supervisor of the clerical and typing pool at the United States Maritime Commission and was awarded a War Service Certificate for her leadership. By 1949, she had married, returned to Fort Worth, and become a licensed funeral director, working at Baker and Hardee-Adams funeral homes, which served the black community in segregated Fort Worth. From 1952 to 1956, she was the managing editor of the Dallas Express, the oldest black newspaper in Texas. From 1955 to 1958, she worked as dean of women at Jarvis Christian College in East Texas. She worked for Texas state senator Don Kennard in the 1960s and worked as a docent at Fort Worth Museum of Science and History in the 1970s.

== Activism ==
Lenora Rolla was involved with religious and civil rights causes as a strong believer that civil rights group struggle without the support of churches in their communities. In 1946, she was a delegate to the National Christian Missionary Convention; in 1954, she was elected president of the organization. In 1953 Rolla spoke at the Disciples of Christ World Convention in Ontario, Canada. She was a delegate at both the 1950 and 1955 United Nations Seminar on World Order. She served as vice-president of the Christian Churches of Texas, a board member of the Fort Worth Area Council of Churches, a board member of the United Christian Missionary Society, and the first female elder at Fort Worth's Community Christian Church.

In the 1940s and 1950s, Rolla was a member of the Tarrant County Precinct Workers Council, which advocated for elimination of the poll tax. In the 1950s, she founded the Hattie Street Haven community center in a former fire station on Fort Worth's east side. She organized boycotts against local businesses that refused to hire blacks and "get out the vote" rallies in Chicago and Fort Worth.

In 1954 Rolla met Martin Luther King, Jr. while traveling on assignment to Montgomery, Alabama, to report on the Brown vs. Board of Education trial for the Dallas Express. She returned in 1955 to cover the Montgomery bus boycott. In 1963, she was selected to serve on Lyndon B. Johnson's Conference on Community Leaders, sponsored by the Equal Employment Opportunity Commission and participated in the historic March on Washington, in which Martin Luther King, Jr. presented his "I Have a Dream" speech and Rolla called the "high point" of her life. About King, Rolla said, "He gave me motivation to keep on keeping on and to be less disturbed by our position...[he] has given me more steel in my limbs and faith."

Through her leadership in the civil rights movement, Rolla met and was influenced by Stokely Carmichael, James Baldwin, Marian Anderson, Esther Rolle, Alex Haley, and Dick Gregory, and brought many such figures to Fort Worth. In the 1960s, she traveled to Chicago to meet Alfreda Duster, the daughter of civil rights leader Ida B. Wells. She visited a number of African countries in 1980 as a missionary and again in 1994 as part of a "homeland" tour based on Alex Haley's Roots saga and organized by the author's son.

In 1986, Rolla participated in the Hands Across America benefit to end homelessness, standing along Lancaster Avenue with her friend and fellow activist, Opal Lee.

== Tarrant County Black Historical and Genealogical Society ==
In 1974, Lenora Rolla was appointed to Fort Worth's Bicentennial planning committee and tasked with gathering the history of African Americans in early Fort Worth history. This project and the release of Alex Haley's Roots inspired Rolla to form the Tarrant County Black Historical and Genealogical Society, which formed in 1977 with 21 charter members led by Rolla. Their first meeting was held at Tarrant County Junior College. The collection was originally stored in the Rolla family's east Fort Worth home. When donations made it grow too large for the home, the collection was moved to the East Berry branch of the Fort Worth Public Library and then to a dedicated building on East Rosedale next door to the home of Manet Helen Fowler, daughter of Manet Harrison Fowler. When this location, too, was outgrown, the collection moved to a two-story house on Humbolt Street. The home was historically significant as it has been the residence of Reverend A.L. Boone, and directly across the street from the Baker Chapel African Methodist Episcopal Church, a longtime center of the black community in Fort Worth. Lenora Rolla conceived the Society's logo of three interlocking keys, which was later drawn and refined by an inmate at the Fort Worth Federal Correctional Institution.

Throughout the 1980s, Rolla took Tarrant County Black Historical and Genealogical Society displays to local schools and churches in order to correct widely held misconceptions about the role of African Americans in U.S. history. According to Rolla, "There's no such thing as black history in the United States of America. We have only one history, American history, and if we taught American history, there'd be no need for me to sit up here."

In 1988, Lenora and the Tarrant County Black Historical and Genealogical Society secured a Texas Historical Marker for the James E. Guinn School in Fort Worth's south side. They attempted to save a group of shotgun houses near Magnolia Avenue, but the structures, historically occupied by blacks, were demolished in 1996.

In 1997, the Tarrant County Black Historical and Genealogical Society's papers were placed at the Fort Worth Public Library Archives. The Society's headquarters on Humbolt Street, which display artifacts and larger items from the collection, have been named the Lenora Rolla Heritage Center Museum in her honor.

== Personal life ==
Lenora married Jacob "Jake" Rolla (1888-1984), a native of Taylor, Texas, on June 22, 1944. Jake Rolla had moved to Fort Worth in 1916 and had a nearly fifty-year career with the Texas and Pacific Railway. He proposed to her during one of her trips back home from Washington, D.C., where the couple were actually wed. The Rollas built a house on Cottey Street, later moving to a house on Ramey Street where they spent the next four decades of their marriage. The Rollas had no biological children, but took in needy people of all races: "drug addicts, refugees, abused children, orphans, alcoholics and drifters, all of whom called her mother."

Rolla was a longtime member of the Community Christian Church in Fort Worth. She was a member of the Tarrant County Historical Commission, the Colored Federated Women's Club, American Woodmen, and Heroines of Jericho. Rolla helped found the Fort Worth Urban League.

Lenora Rolla was described as having a "razor-sharp intelligence, keen sense of humor and courage to speak out." She died on June 29, 2001, and was buried at Cedar Hill Memorial Park in Arlington, Texas.

== Awards and recognition ==
Rolla's efforts were recognized locally and nationally:

- 1971 - March 19 declared Lenora Rolla Day by the mayor of Fort Worth. Jim Wright presented a congressional resolution honoring Lenora Rolla and a similar resolution was presented in the Texas Senate. 450 people attended a dinner at the Sycamore Park Recreation Center honoring Rolla.
- 1983 - Received a First Century Distinguished Alumni Award from Fort Worth Independent School District
- 1986 - Inducted into the Texas Black Women's Hall of Fame
- 1986 - Biographical exhibit, I Lenora: The Woman Who Triumphed Over All Odds, displayed at the University of Texas at Arlington
- 1987 - Received award from the National Conference for Community and Justice
- 1987 - Included in the They Showed the Way exhibit at the African American Museum in Dallas
- 1988 - Received the National Endowment for the Arts Carter G. Goodson Memorial Award
- 1989 - Named the Outstanding Woman of Fort Worth
- 1990 - Received the William E. Jary, Jr. Memorial Award from the Tarrant County Historical Commission
- 1994 - Received the Pioneer Award from the National Women's History Month organization
- 1994 - Named a Forum Fellow by the Leadership Fort Worth organization
- 1999 - Inducted into the Pioneer Hall of Fame at Jarvis Christian College
- 1999 - March 4 declared Lenora Rolla Day in Fort Worth in celebration of her 95th birthday
