= G. Craige Lewis =

American pastor (born 1969)

George Craige Lewis
- Born: G. Craige Lewis; July 19, 1969 (age 56); Fort Worth, Texas, U.S.
- Occupations: Pastor, evangelist, life coach, author, public speaker

George Craige Lewis (born July 19, 1969) is a Christian pastor of Adamant Believers Council in North Richland Hills, Texas, who also travels the world with his EX Ministries that includes speaking against hip-hop culture.

== EX Ministries ==
EX Ministries was created to educate and inform Christians about Satan in order to protect their relationship with God with an eye to the second coming. Lewis has released a book and series of DVDs, both titled The Truth Behind Hip Hop, where he teaches that hip hop music has affected youth across America by leading them to Satan worship, suicide, and drug use and that hip-hop culture is "the greatest attack on the youth of the world". Lewis argues that rap music and hip-hop are not the same, with the latter being a sub-culture and a religion, not a genre of music. He also preaches about the importance of family and encourages youth on his weekly radio show on KHVN in Dallas, Texas. Lewis and EX Ministries also offers followers to subscribe to the Daily Word delivered Monday-Friday.

Lewis has been criticized as an extremist who hates secular music of any kind and misrepresents the hip-hop culture. Lewis has also targeted Christian leaders, including Kirk Franklin and T.D. Jakes. His ministry has also encouraged the destruction of CDs and other hip-hop merchandise. On his official website Lewis provides responses to critics of his ministry.
