= I.M. Terrell High School =

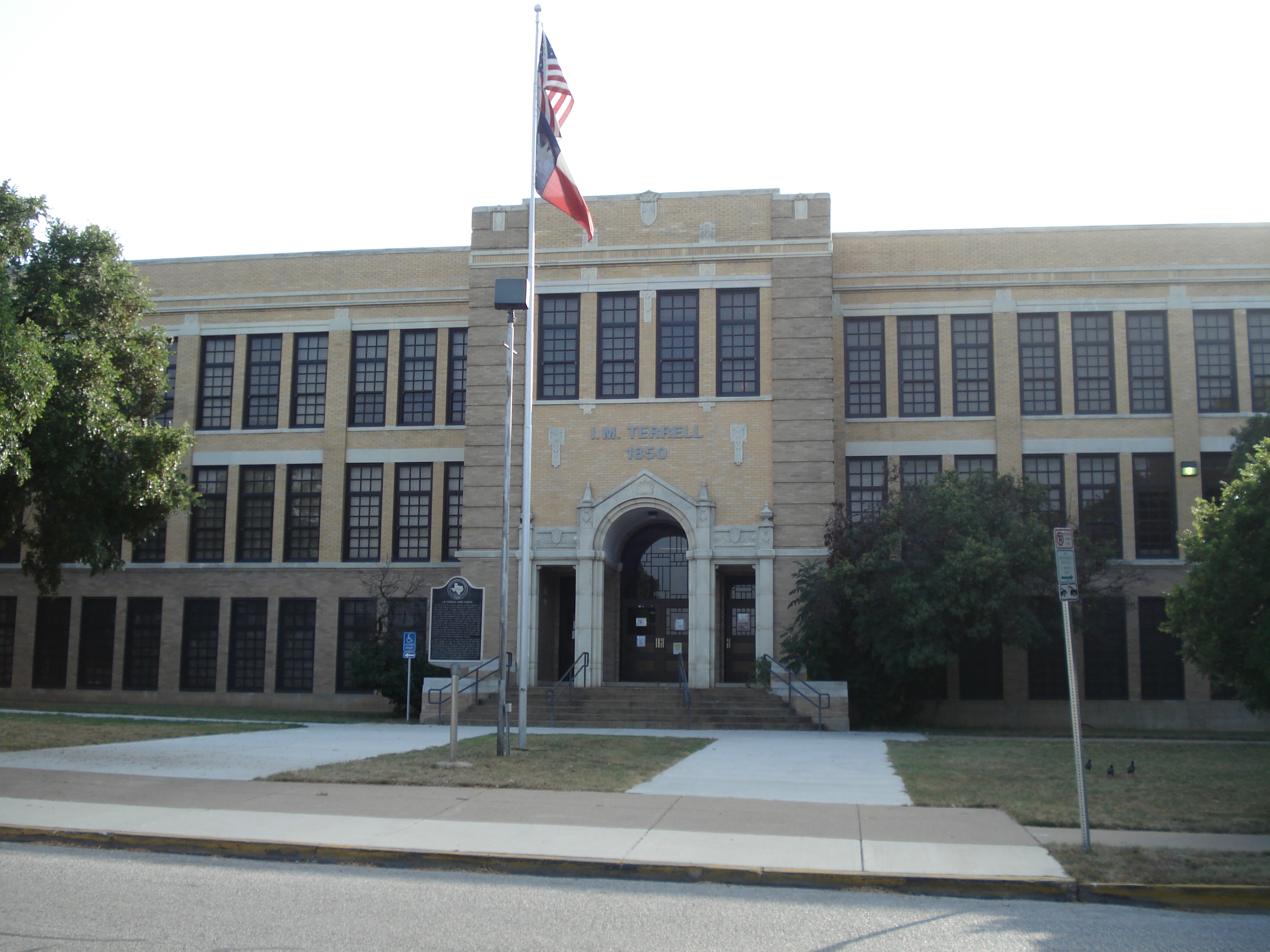
- Site of former I.M. Terrell High School as of 2013.

Location
- 1411 I.M. Terrell Circle S. Fort Worth, Texas 76102; United States; 32°44′56.54″N 97°18′52.50″W

Information
- Other name: I.M. Terrell Academy for STEM and VPA (2018)
- School type: High school (Public)
- Established: 1882
- Status: Reopened (2018)
- Closed: 1973 (I.M. Terrell High School)
- School district: Fort Worth Independent School District
- Superintendent: Alexander Hogg (1882); I.M. Terrell (1890)
- Principal: I.M. Terrell (1910-1915)
- Faculty: 26 (1940s)
- Grades: 9-11 (1940s)
- Enrollment: 900 (1940s)
- Athletics conference: Prairie View Interscholastic League
- Communities served: Fort Worth; also Arlington, Bedford, Benbrook, Burleson, Roanoke, Weatherford
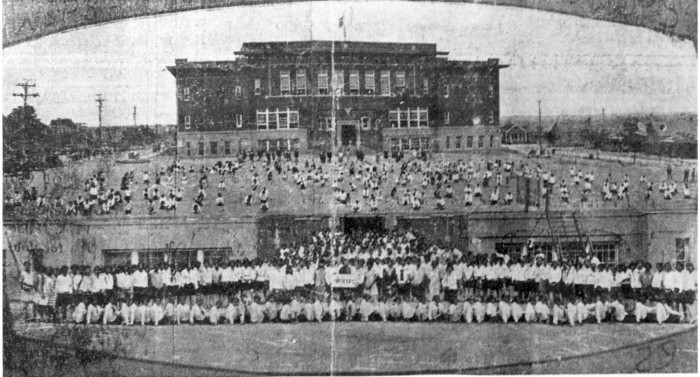
- I.M. Terrell High School at its previous location in 1921.

I.M. Terrell High School was a secondary school located in Fort Worth, Texas. The school opened in 1882 as the city's first black school, during the era of formal racial segregation in the United States. Though the high school closed in 1973, the building reopened as an elementary school in 1998. After undergoing extensive remodeling and expansion, it is now the home of the I.M. Terrell Academy for STEM and VPA. The school building lies within the Butler Place Historic District.

== History ==
In 1882, I. M. Terrell (1859–1931) became the head of East Ninth Street Colored School, the first free public school for African Americans in Fort Worth, located on the southwest corner of Pecan Street and East Ninth Street. Terrell became Principal and Superintendent of Colored Schools in 1890. In June of 1906, the Fort Worth and Denver City Railway Company petitioned the city council for use of the property the school building was on to build a railway freight house, and the school was moved to a location at East Twelfth and Steadman Streets, and was renamed North Side Colored School No. 11.

A new school building opened in 1910, with Terrell as principal. In 1915, Terrell left the school to become an administrator at Prairie View State Normal and Industrial College (now Prairie View A&M University). The school was renamed I.M Terrell High School in 1921, in honor of the former principal. Due to lack of funding, during its early years, the school lacked a gymnasium, cafeteria, and library. The building also had a limited number of rooms for teaching and the textbooks were handed down from nearby white schools. Eventually, the school's first library would be started by Lillian B. Jones Horace, a teacher and librarian who encouraged parents and students to donate books.

In 1938, the school moved to an existing school building (formerly the white "Andrew J. Chambers School," and known as "East Eighteenth Street Colored School No. K" at the time) at 1411 East Eighteenth Street in the Baptist Hill neighborhood. The building was expanded as part of a Works Progress Administration project. The school's former location became an elementary and junior high school.

In 1940, the Association of Colleges and Secondary Schools for Negroes (ACSSN) selected I.M. Terrell High School to participate as an experimental site in the Secondary School Study (also known as the Black High School Study). The study, funded by the General Education Board, sought to include African American teachers in the development of progressive education. According to the study, by the 1940s the school had 26 faculty members serving 900 students in grades 9 through 11.

In addition to serving students in Fort Worth, the school drew students from areas outside the city, including Arlington, Bedford, Benbrook, Burleson, Roanoke, and Weatherford, where African American children could not attend school.

I.M. Terrell High School closed in 1973 during racial integration of Fort Worth's schools. The building reopened in 1998 as I.M. Terrell Elementary School. In 2004, the portion of East Eighteenth Street around the school was renamed I.M. Terrell Circle South. In 2018, the former elementary school was reopened as the I.M. Terrell Academy for STEM and VPA after a $41 million restoration and construction project.

== Music program ==
G.A. Baxter was the school's music instructor during the mid-twentieth century, when several students who would later become prominent jazz and rhythm and blues musicians attended the school. Various accounts portray Baxter as encouraging his students "to push the boundaries of sound," or as "a stern band director who hated jazz." Free jazz innovator Ornette Coleman was in the school band until he was dismissed for improvising during "The Washington Post." Fellow musicians John Carter, King Curtis, Prince Lasha, Charles Moffett, and Dewey Redman all attended I.M. Terrell with Coleman. Julius Hemphill, Ronald Shannon Jackson, Cornell Dupree, Billy Tom Robinson, Thomas Reese and Ray Sharpe also graduated from I.M. Terrell.

In a 1981 Musician interview, Ronald Shannon Jackson recalls:

Dallas was bigger than Fort Worth, but Fort Worth always had the cats who were on the money in terms of the music. It had a lot to do with our music teacher there, Mr. Baxter. He played all the instruments. He loved to perfect a band. He put his whole life into music — to the point it would drive him mad, so dedicated, totally dedicated. A lot of people come through this man: he was Ornette Coleman's teacher, he was Dewey Redman's teacher, he was Julius Hemphill's teacher, Charles Moffett's teacher and John Carter's and mine. King Curtis, my father's cousin, also came from there.

== Athletic program ==
From 1951 until 1966, I.M. Terrell High School was part of the Prairie View Interscholastic League, which integrated with the University Interscholastic League in 1970. Hall of Fame coach Robert Hughes coached the basketball team at Terrell from 1958 until the high school's closure. Hughes was the United States' winningest high school basketball coach from February 11, 2003, to December 7, 2010, and is currently the winningest boys high school basketball coach in the United States,

== Notable alumni ==
- John Carter, musician
- James Cash Jr., Harvard Business School, professor emeritus
- Ornette Coleman, musician
- King Curtis, musician
- Cornell Dupree, musician
- Lillian B. Horace, educator and author
- Julius Hemphill, musician
- Ronald Shannon Jackson, musician
- Prince Lasha, musician
- Opal Lee, activist, the "Grandmother of Juneteenth"
- Rosalind Miles, actress and fashion model
- George Minor, baseball outfielder
- Charles Moffett, musician
- Dewey Redman, musician
- Ray Sharpe, musician
