= Abigail Klein =

American actress (born 1988)

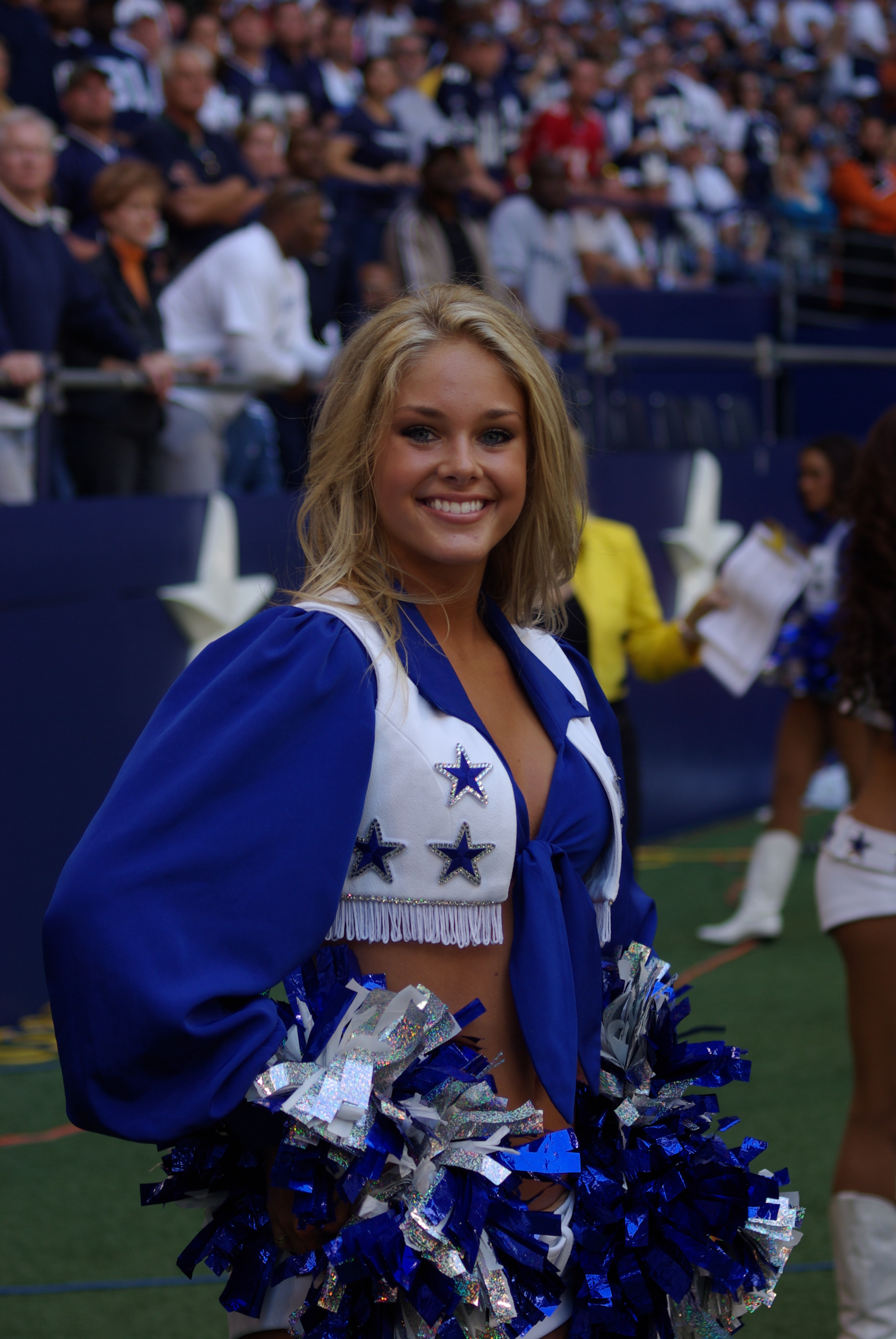
- Klein in 2008
- Born: December 24, 1988 (age 37); Dallas, Texas, U.S.
- Education: North Lake College
- Occupations: Cheerleader; actress
- Years active: 2007–present
- Spouse: Chris Armstrong (m. 2016)

Abigail Klein (born December 24, 1988) is an American actress and former professional cheerleader. She is best known for playing the role of Stephanie Johnson on the NBC and Peacock Daytime soap opera Days of Our Lives since 2022. She is a former Dallas Cowboys cheerleader.

== Early life ==
Klein was born in Dallas, Texas, and raised in Irving. She grew up down the street from where the Dallas Cowboys Cheerleaders practiced. She had a passion for acting and dancing since childhood. Klein attended North Lake College.

== Career ==
At eighteen, Klein decided to audition for the Dallas Cowboys cheerleaders. During the audition process, she visited a friend on the set of the film Iron Man and felt tempted to pursue acting instead. Klein ultimately decided to stick with cheerleading. She was hired by the Dallas Cowboys Cheerleaders, traveling with them on a USO tour to Kuwait, Iraq, and Afghanistan.

Klein appeared as herself on a few seasons of Dallas Cowboys Cheerleaders: Making the Team. After three years, she decided to retire from cheerleading and focus on acting.

After moving to Los Angeles, Klein's first acting job was an "under five" role as a nanny on The Young and the Restless. She soon landed a role in the Adam Sandler film That's My Boy. Klein made guest appearances on 90210, Castle, Drop Dead Diva, The Comeback, and CSI: Crime Scene Investigation.

Klein was cast in Cabot College, an unaired 2014 comedy pilot starring Fortune Feimster. She starred in a TV commercial for Taco Bell, playing a girlfriend who's always taking Instagram photos.

Klein appeared in Transformers: Age of Extinction. She also had roles in the TV Movies 10 Year Reunion and Girlfriends of Christmas Past. In 2015 and 2018, Klein had a recurring role as Stacey on The Incredible Life of Darrell. From 2016 to 2017, she had a recurring role as Nurse Eloise on Code Black.

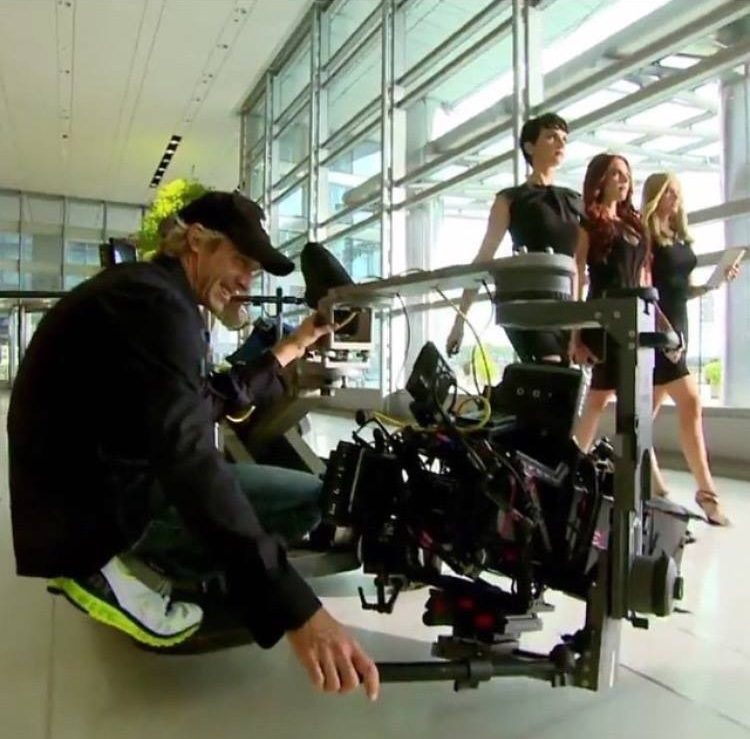
Michael Bay filming Transformers: Age of Extinction; actresses Abigail Klein, Melanie Specht and Victoria Summer are walking in a corridor.

She appeared in the film Butterfly Caught. On television, she guest starred on S.W.A.T., American Housewife, Ryan Hansen Solves Crimes on Television, and GLOW. Klein had recurring roles on There's...Johnny! and Aussie Girl. She starred as Courtney Bennett in the 2020 Lifetime TV Movie Christmas on Ice.

Since 2022, Klein has played the role of Stephanie Johnson on Days of Our Lives. The role was previously played by Shelley Hennig. Klein first appeared as Stephanie in the Peacock spinoff Days of Our Lives: Beyond Salem, before moving to the main series.

== Personal life ==
Klein met her husband, Chris Armstrong, in 2012, after she saw him in a photo on her friend's Twitter account. They were married on October 22, 2016. Armstrong is a sports agent who manages PGA tour golfers.

== Filmography ==
=== Film ===
Year	Title	Role	Notes
2012	That's My Boy	Bridesmaid	
2014	Transformers: Age of Extinction	Joshua's Assistant	
2017	Butterfly Caught	Elsa	
2018	A Futile and Stupid Gesture	Missy	

=== Television ===
Year	Title	Role	Notes
2007–2009	Dallas Cowboys Cheerleaders: Making the Team	Self	24 episodes
2009	Valley Peaks	President of the World	2 episodes
2011	The Young and the Restless	Nanny #3	Episode: "#1.9592"
2011	90210	Taylor	Episode: "Up in Smoke"
2012	Pair of Kings	Tiffany	Episode: "The Oogli Stick"
2013	CSI: Crime Scene Investigation	Rainy Days	Episode: "Dead Air"
2013	Drop Dead Diva	Donna Andrews	Episode: "Missed Congeniality"
2014	Castle	Carrie	Episode: "Dressed to Kill"
2014	The Comeback	Ashley	Episode: "Valerie is Brought to Her Knees"
2015–2018	The Incredible Life of Darrell	Stacey	3 episodes
2016	10 Year Reunion	Abby Edwards	Television film
2016	Girlfriends of Christmas Past	Zoe Swann	Television film
2016–2017	Code Black	Nurse Eloise Munello	5 episodes
2017	Sorry, Ari	Box Office Girl	Episode: "Hamilton"
2017	There's...Johnny!	Chrissy-Ann Aldean	3 episodes
2018	Aussie Girl	Trisha Pilthmore	3 episodes
2019	Ryan Hansen Solves Crimes on Television	Jenn	Episode: "Revival"
2019	GLOW	Joy	Episode: "Desert Pollen"
2020	Christmas on Ice	Courtney Bennett	Television film
2020	S.W.A.T.	Liz	Episode: "Animus"
2021	American Housewife	Mimi	Episode: "The Guardian"
2022	Days of Our Lives: Beyond Salem	Stephanie Johnson	TV Mini-Series, 1 episode
2022–present	Days of Our Lives	Stephanie Johnson	Contract role
