= Judy Trammell =

American choreographer (born 1958)

- Born: Judy Carol Tharp; April 29, 1958 (age 68); Dallas, Texas
- Education: R.L. Turner High School.
- Occupations: Head choreographer (Dallas Cowboys Cheerleaders) television personality (Dallas Cowboys Cheerleaders: Making the Team{2006-2022}; America's Sweethearts: Dallas Cowboys Cheerleaders{2024-present})
- Years active: 1991-present
- Spouse: Dick Trammell
- Children: Blair Trammell; Taylor Trammell; Cassie Trammell

Judy Tharp Trammell (born April 29, 1958) is an American choreographer, television personality, and retired dancer. She is the current head choreographer of the Dallas Cowboys Cheerleaders. She is also a former member of the squad. She appeared in the CMT reality series Dallas Cowboys Cheerleaders: Making the Team and currently in the Netflix series America's Sweethearts: Dallas Cowboys Cheerleaders.

== Early life ==
Trammell was born and raised in Dallas, Texas and graduated from R.L. Turner High School.

== Career ==
Trammell was a Dallas Cowboys Cheerleader for four years, from 1980-1984, and during that time served as group leader and a show group member. She is trained in jazz, pom, drill team, and tap dance. She became assistant choreographer of the Dallas Cowboys Cheerleaders in 1984. In 1991, she was promoted to head choreographer and has served in that position ever since. After Director Kelli Finglass, Trammell is the second former Dallas Cowboys Cheerleader to join the organization in an administrative role.

Trammell has also choreographed for Jerry Lewis, Toby Keith's Should've Been A Cowboy music video, Little Texas' God Blessed Texas music video, Phil Donahue, Geraldo Rivera and Montel Williams' talk shows, Harry and the Hendersons, Oak Ridge Boys Benefit Concert, the Country Music Awards, Nashville Palace, Miss Texas Pageant, Salute to Lady Liberty television special, as well as high school musicals and beauty pageants in the Dallas area. She has also choreographed for Reba McEntire, Randy Travis, LeAnn Rimes, Creed, Jessica Simpson, Destiny's Child, Sheryl Crow, Carrie Underwood, MC Hammer, and the NBC Academy of Country and Western Music Awards.

She has appeared on television shows such as Dr. T & the Women, The View, and Queer Eye For the Straight Guy.

== Personal life ==
Judy is married to Dick Trammell and has three children. They currently reside in Garland, Texas. Her daughter, Cassie Trammell, cheered for eight years with Cheer Athletics and won a national title as well as two gold medals at the Allstar Cheerleading World Championships while on the Cheer Athletics Panthers. Cassie later cheered with the Dallas Cowboys Cheerleaders from 2008-2013, serving as group leader her fourth and fifth season on the team. Cassie's wedding was the only wedding featured on the television show Dallas Cowboys Cheerleaders: Brides.
