= Dallas Cowboys Cheerleaders =

NFL cheerleader squad for the Dallas Cowboys

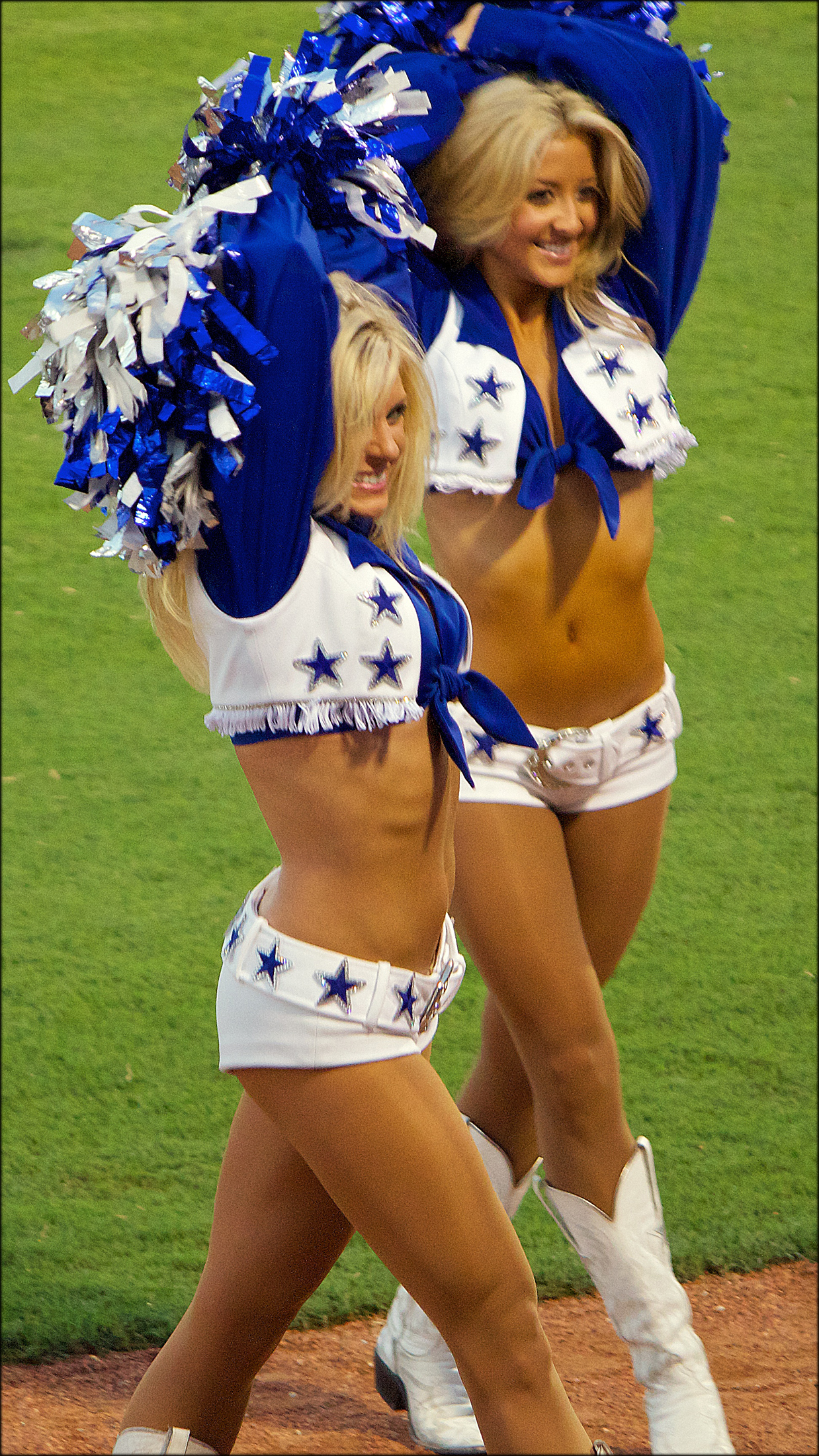
- Established: September 1961; 65 years ago
- Members: 36
- Director: Kelli Finglass
- Choreographer: Judy Trammell
- Affiliations: Dallas Cowboys
- Website: dallascowboyscheerleaders.com

The Dallas Cowboys Cheerleaders (often abbreviated as DCC, and officially nicknamed "America's Sweethearts", and sometimes referred to as the Dallas Cowgirls, especially during the 1970s) are the National Football League cheerleading squad representing the Dallas Cowboys team. Their uniforms consist of a blue crop top, a pair of white hotpants, and white cowboy boots.

== History ==
=== 1960s ===
During a game between the Cowboys and the Atlanta Falcons at the Cotton Bowl during the 1967 season, the short-skirted performer Bubbles Cash attracted significant attention from the crowd which cheered when she walked down the stands staircase on the 50-yard line carrying cotton candy in each hand. She became an instant public sensation in Dallas, also gaining attention from Cowboys general manager Tex Schramm. Understanding the importance of the entertainment industry to the Cowboys' profitability, Schramm was inspired to form a cheerleading squad dressed in similar fashion to Cash.

=== 1970s ===
Preparing for the 1970 season, Schramm decided to change the cheerleaders' image to boost attendance. At first the main change was to create an all-female squad and change the uniforms and style of cheerleading routines to be primarily dance and less traditional acrobatic routines such as that of high school or college cheerleading squads. The ten local high school cheerleaders who were selected for the 1970 season were also involved in the task of totally redesigning the uniforms and creating new dance style cheer routines under Dee Brock's direction and with the help of a choreographer. In 1971, the qualification rules changed to allow not only local female cheerleaders to compete for a spot on the squad, but also high school drill team officers. Then in 1972, Texie Waterman, a New York choreographer, was recruited and assigned to audition and train an entirely new female squad who would all be over 18 years of age, searching for performers with attractive appearance, athletic ability, and raw talent. Since the 1972 squad consisted of adults, this allowed the possibility of again redesigning the uniforms to introduce a more revealing look (most notably transitioning from the traditional cheerleader skirt to hot pants) closer to the classic DCC image that is known today.

Even greater national attention came in the fall of 1977. When the Cowboys, along with designer and photographer Bob Shaw, produced the first NFL cheerleader poster for the Dallas Cowboys. This, and an Esquire magazine article by Shaw in October 1977, led to the squad appearing on two network TV specials, NBC Rock-n-Roll Sports Classic and The Osmond Brothers Special on ABC. Also that year, the DCC produced their own one-hour special, The 36 Most Beautiful Girls in Texas, which aired on ABC prior to the season opener of Monday Night Football (which coincidentally was a game that the Cowboys hosted). On January 14, 1979, one week before the Cowboys played in Super Bowl XIII, the made-for-TV movie Dallas Cowboys Cheerleaders aired. Starring Bert Convy and Jane Seymour, it had a 48% share of the national television audience.

During the late 1970s and early 1980s, the cheerleaders were often referred to as the "Dallas Cowgirls". In 1983, 2 former cheerleaders attempted to form a separate company called the "Dallas Cowgirls" but were sued by the Dallas Cowboys Cheerleaders.

=== 1980s ===
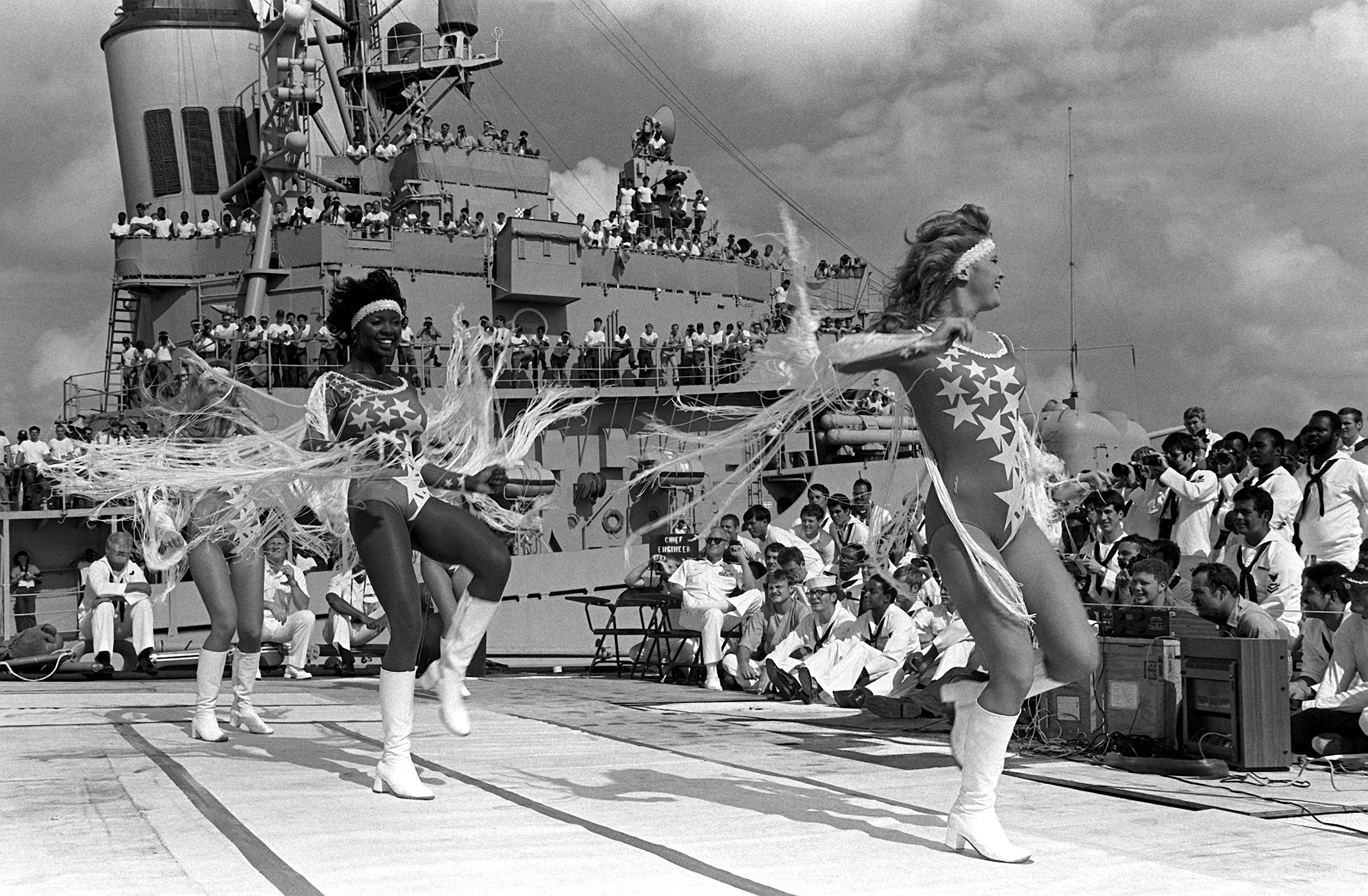
The Dallas Cowboys Cheerleaders perform their USO show "America and Her Music" on the deck of the U.S. Navy guided missile cruiser USS Bainbridge (CGN-25), in 1983.

On January 13, 1980, a sequel to the original TV movie, Dallas Cowboys Cheerleaders II, aired. The Cheerleaders have made many other TV appearances since then, and their likeness has been featured on various merchandise, such as posters, T-shirts, trading cards, and calendars.

The DCC has also toured throughout the United States (on and off the field), as well as overseas. Included in these tours are regular appearances in United Service Organizations (USO) tours, which began during the 1979 holiday season for U.S. troops stationed in South Korea.

=== 1990s ===
The DCC held a ceremony inaugurating the second game of the 1994 FIFA World Cup between Spain and South Korea.

Former DCCs Kelli McGonagill Finglass and Judy Trammell became the squad's director and choreographer, respectively.

=== 2000s–present ===
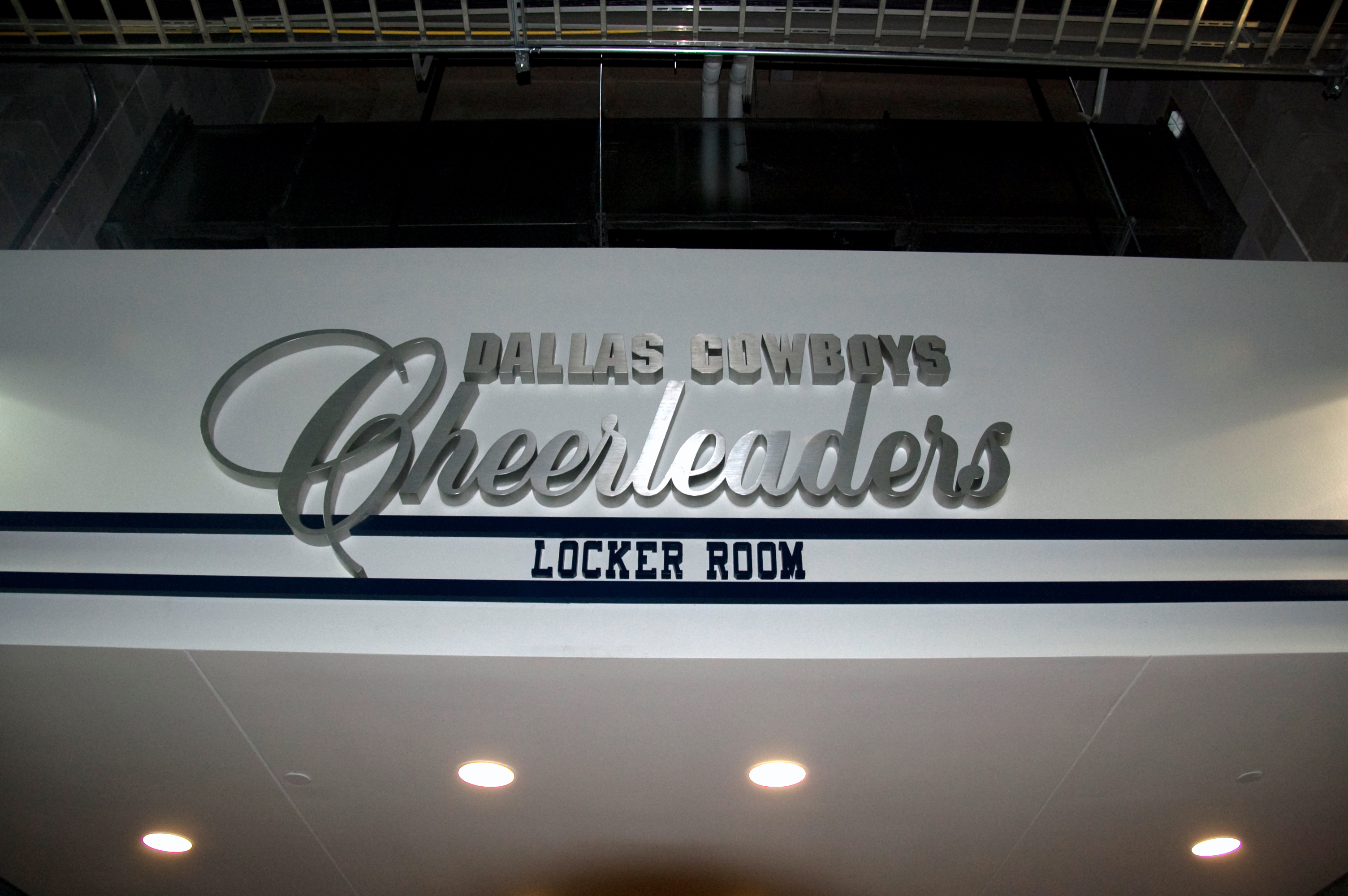
Locker room in the new stadium, 2009

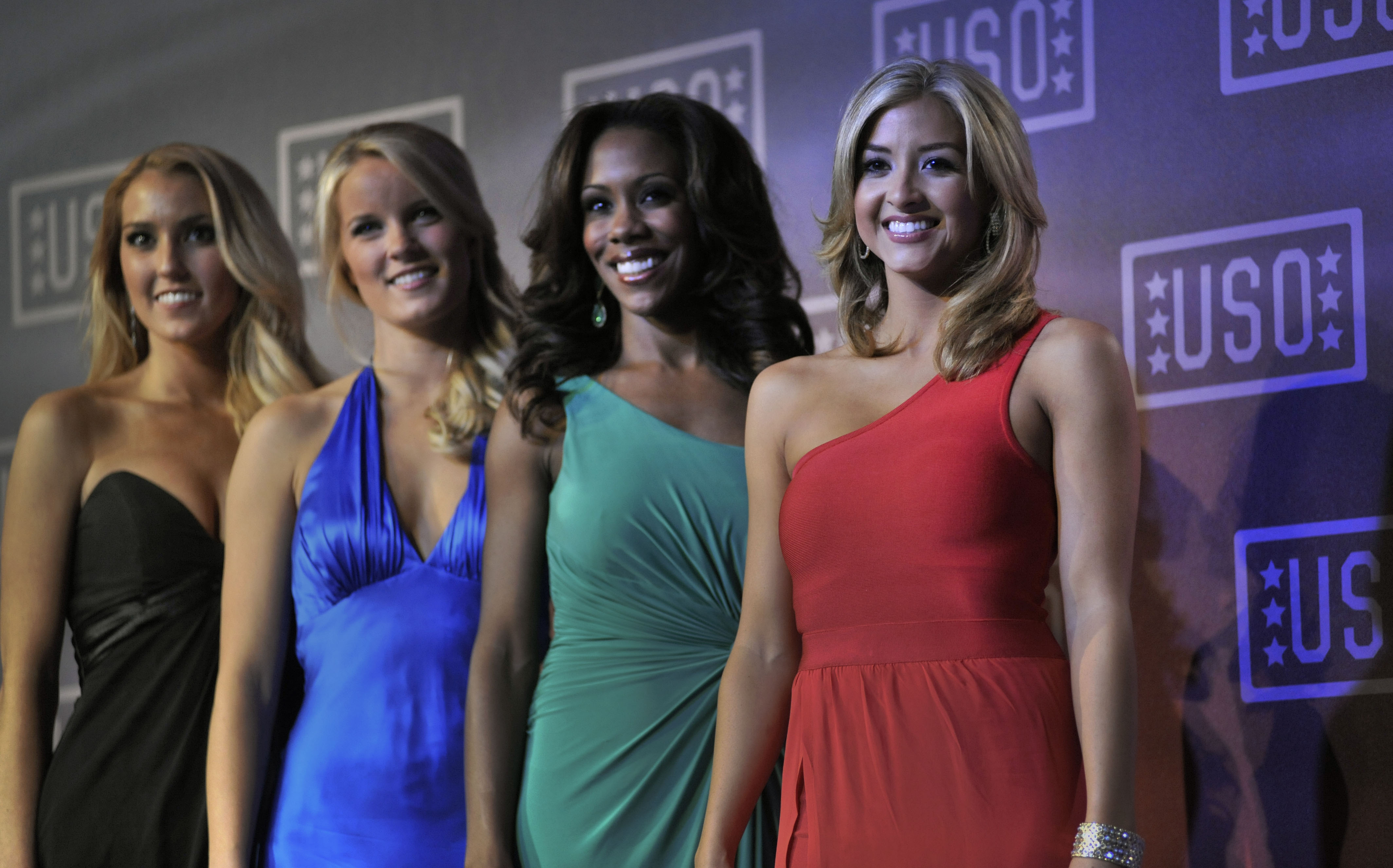
USO Gala, 2012

From 2006 to 2021, the Cheerleaders produced their own reality television series, Dallas Cowboys Cheerleaders: Making the Team, which aired on Country Music Television (CMT) during the NFL football season. The series followed the audition process of the annual squad. Traditionally, each episode would include segments of the “Training Camp Candidates” and “Veteran Candidates” dancing along to music and learning new choreography from guest choreographers. Despite the show running successfully for 16 seasons, CMT decided to not renew the show for its 17th season. A new series, America's Sweethearts: Dallas Cowboys Cheerleaders aired on Netflix on June 20, 2024.

The DCC also held an opening ceremony and podium at the 2013 and 2018, 2021 and 2023 United States Grands Prix races in Austin, Texas. They received the FIFA delegation to promote the 2022 FIFA World Cup.

The DCC releases several calendars every year. More recently, in addition to their annual swimsuit calendar, they also release an annual "sideline calendar," featuring photos of the DCC cheering and performing at Cowboys home games. For decades the DCC also act as advocates for female empowerment in the DFW metroplex.

The DCC were the subject of the documentary Daughters of the Sexual Revolution: The Untold Story of the Dallas Cowboys Cheerleaders released in November 2018. It focuses on Suzanne Mitchell who was the director of the team from 1972 to 1989.

In December 2021, the magazine Texas Monthly released an 8-episode podcast called "America's Girls," featuring interviews with former cheerleaders and other people involved with the DCC.

In June and July 2026, the cheerleaders performed at hydration breaks, halftime, and pregames at select games during the 2026 FIFA World Cup.

In October 2026, the cheerleaders announced they had unionized and formed an agreement to have the union recognized by company management. During that same month, Pro Silver Star, the cheerleader’s brand owner, sued rock band My Chemical Romance for using the blue and white look of the cheerleaders uniform during their Hollywood Bowl run of their successful Long Live The Black Parade tour. The band initially dismissed the case and kept doing the performance, but eventually settled an out-of-court settlement and agreed to stop using the uniform.

== Cultural impact and legacy ==
The Dallas Cowboys Cheerleaders are one of the most recognized professional cheerleading teams in the United States. The team has played a significant role in creating and maintaining the public image of modern NFL Cheerleading. Beginning in the 1970s, this team contributed to the transformation of NFL cheerleading from casual sideline support into a profitable form of entertainment. Between their famous uniforms, highly-skilled dance routines, and attention in the media, they have set a new standard for the other NFL teams.

Over time, the organization's popularity and exposure have expanded significantly. They have increased visibility through special performances, television appearances, and the creation of merchandise. The media has frequently painted the cheerleaders as the symbol of the Dallas Cowboys as a brand. They create a blend of sports and popular culture in America today. Their appearances outside of season games introduce the cheerleaders to a broad spectrum of audiences across the country, earning them the title of "America's Team."

Growing media attention has increased the team's cultural significance. Their image has often been associated with the entertainment side of professional football. However, the Dallas Cowboys Cheerleaders have also been part of broader and more important journalistic coverage. They are situated at the forefront of topics such as labor conditions, unfair compensation, the gender wage gap, and the overall role of cheerleaders in professional sports.

Many news reports and journals point to the group's long-lasting influence on the expectations of modern professional cheerleading. The team puts emphasis on professional level dance skills, branding and commercializing, and utilizing promotional events. Through decades of media visibility, live performances, and strategic marketing, the Dallas Cowboys Cheerleaders have become and remained a strong reference point in cultural discussions of both aesthetic and broader cultural subjects. They are frequently referenced in discussions about the commercialization and cultural meaning of cheerleading in the United States.

== In media ==
- The cheerleading squad was featured in the reality show Dallas Cowboys Cheerleaders: Making the Team that aired on CMT from 2006 to 2021. The series follows the auditioning process and the forming of the annual squad. The series features director Kelli McGonagill Finglass and choreographer Judy Trammell. In April 2022, it was reported that CMT canceled the series, with the show being shopped to other outlets.
- In 2024, the squad was featured on the Netflix documentary series titled America's Sweethearts: Dallas Cowboys Cheerleaders.

== Off-field television appearances ==
Along with their two TV movies, the DCC has also appeared on numerous TV shows and specials as performers, guest acting roles, and game show contestants. Some of the shows on which they have appeared include:

- The Love Boat, Episodes #62 and #63 (Season 3) and #84 (Season 4)
- WrestleMania 32
- WrestleMania 38

== In fiction ==
- Dallas Cowboys Cheerleaders a 1979 comedy-drama television film starring Jane Seymour.
- Debbie Does Dallas is a fictionalized (and pornographic) account of a group of teenagers' efforts to join a thinly veiled version of the squad. Porn star Bambi Woods (who played the title role) had actually auditioned for the real-life DCC but didn't make the squad. The DCC objected to the producer's imitation use of their uniform (which is a DCC trademark) and were able to secure injunctions to block theaters from showing the film.
- The 1982 promotional comic book Spider-Man and the Incredible Hulk in Southwest Showdown featured the Dallas Cowboy Cheerleaders in a starring role. The comic was a collaboration between Marvel Comics and Sanger–Harris department stores and was given away for free in the Dallas Times Herald.

== DCC alumni ==
Many former DCCs have gone on to achieve success in entertainment, sports marketing, and other notable endeavors. They include:

- Bonnie-Jill Laflin (1996–97), Emmy Award-winning sports broadcaster; first female scout in the NBA; author.
- Tanea Brooks (1998–2001), professional wrestler known as Rebel/Reba in All Elite Wrestling
- Kelli Finglass (1984–89), director of the Dallas Cowboys Cheerleaders and executive producer of Dallas Cowboys Cheerleaders: Making the Team
- Jill Marie Jones (1993-95), actress; played Antoinette Childs-Garrett on the television show Girlfriends, former Dallas Mavericks cheerleader
- Brandi Redmond (2000–02; 2004–05), television personality; cast member on The Real Housewives of Dallas
- Abigail Klein (2007–10), actress; stars as Stephanie Johnson on the television show Days of Our Lives
- Melissa Rycroft (2006–08), television personality; winner of The Bachelor (Season 13); second-runner up on Dancing with the Stars (Season 8); winner of Dancing with the Stars (All-Stars);
- Sarah Shahi (1999–2000), actress; USA Network's Fairly Legal and CBS's Person of Interest
- Judy Trammell (1980–84), DCC head choreographer and television personality on Dallas Cowboys Cheerleaders: Making the Team and America's Sweethearts: Dallas Cowboys Cheerleaders.
- Reece Weaver (2023–25), actress, dancer, and author

== Gallery ==
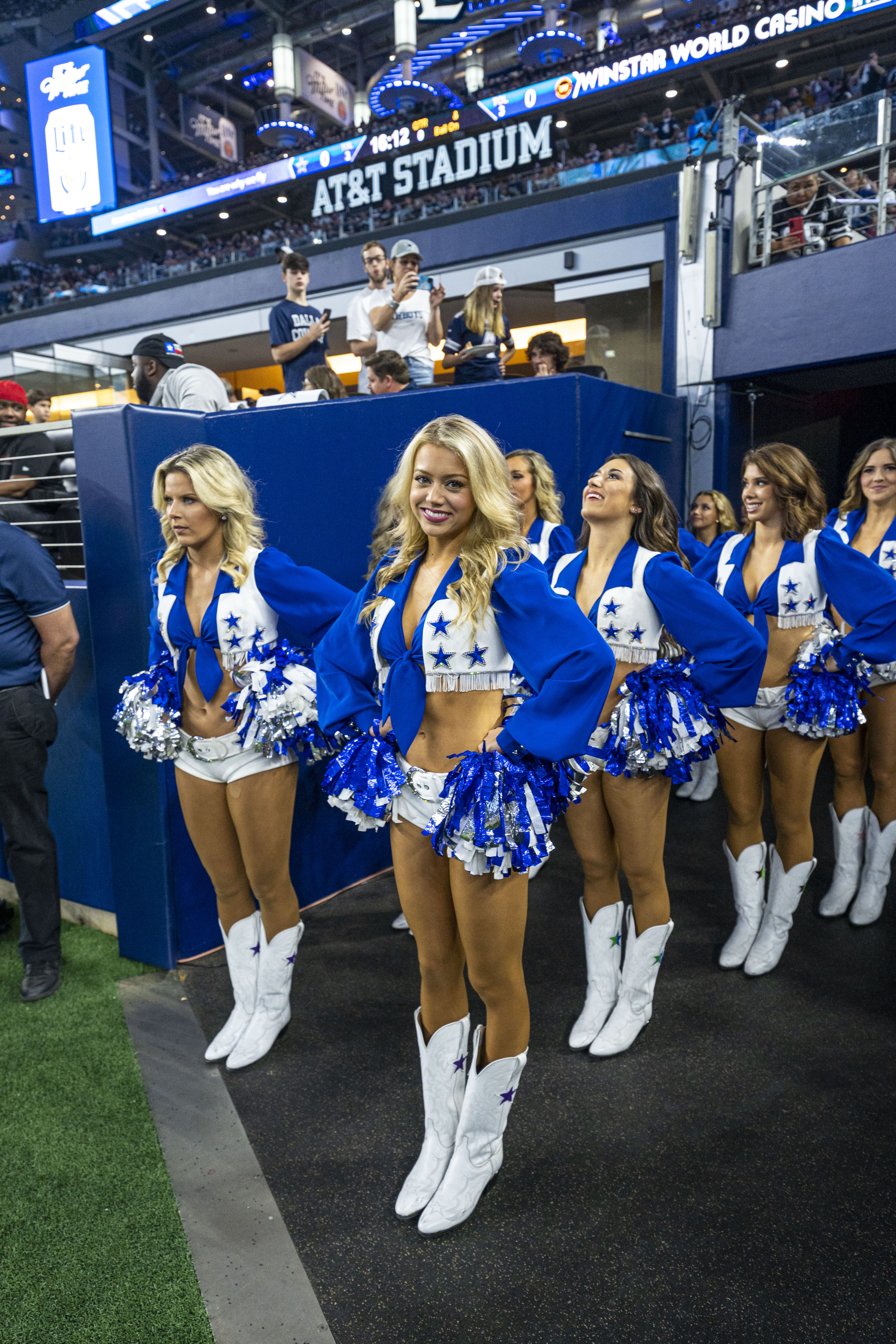

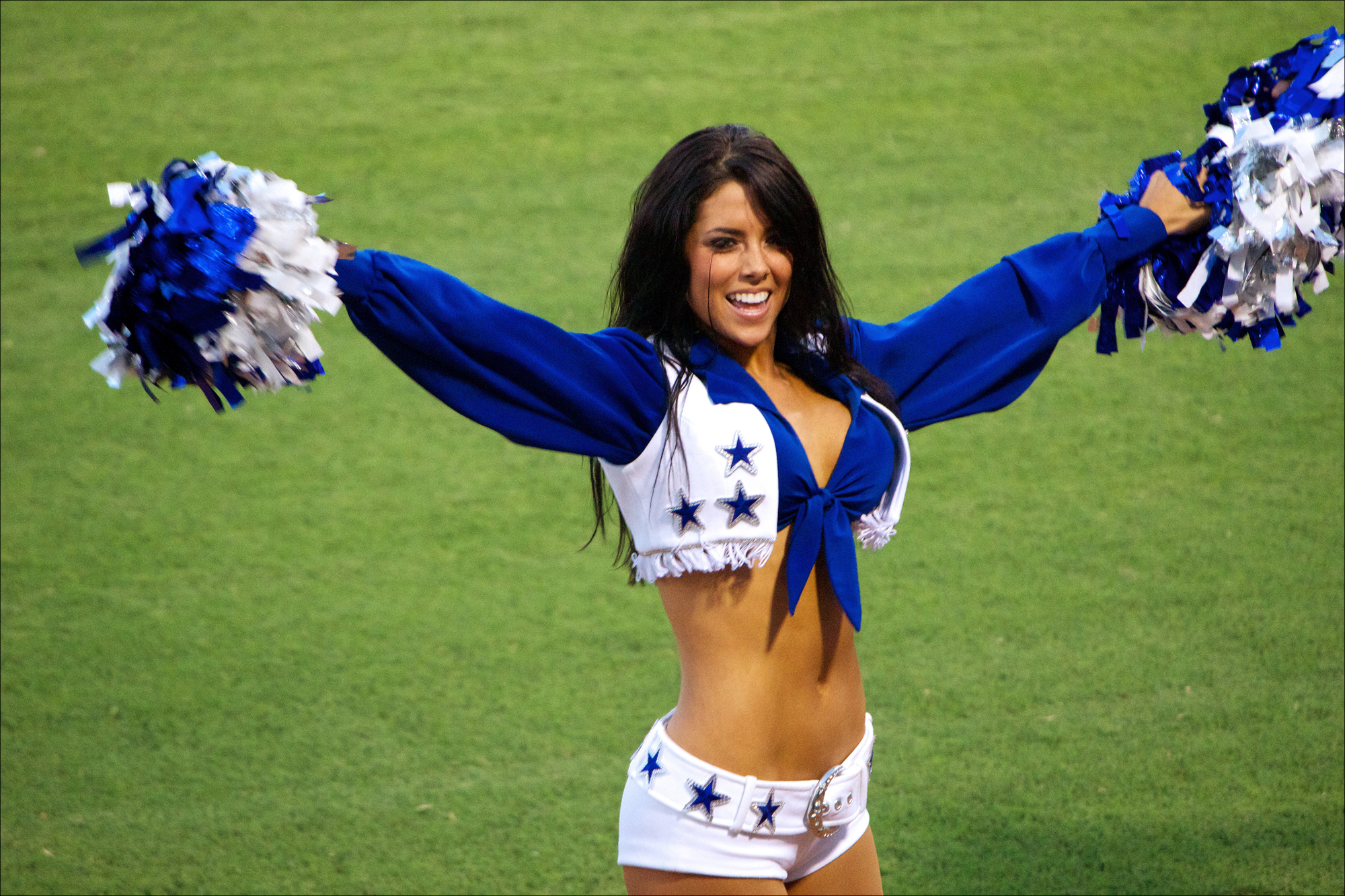

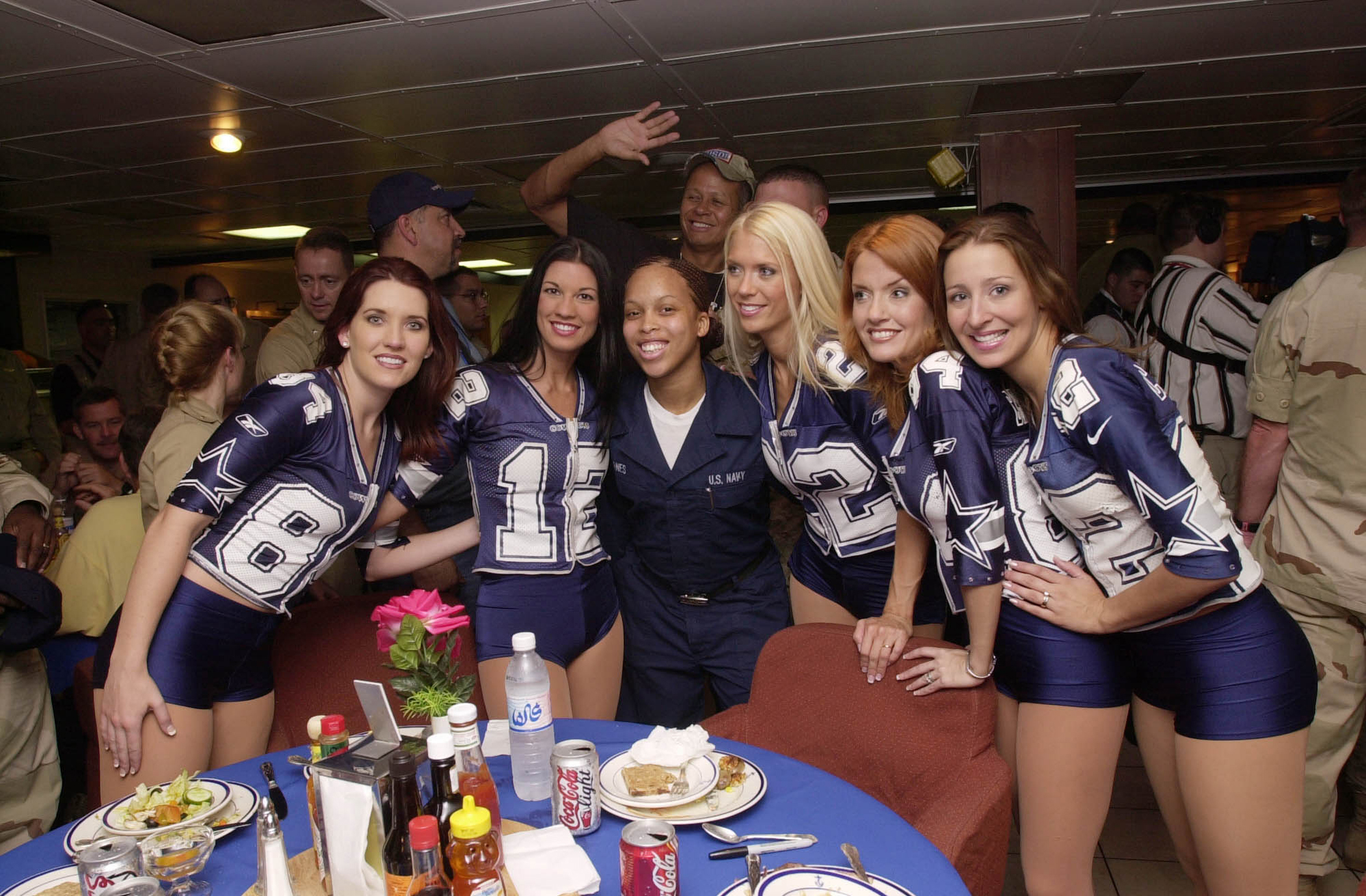

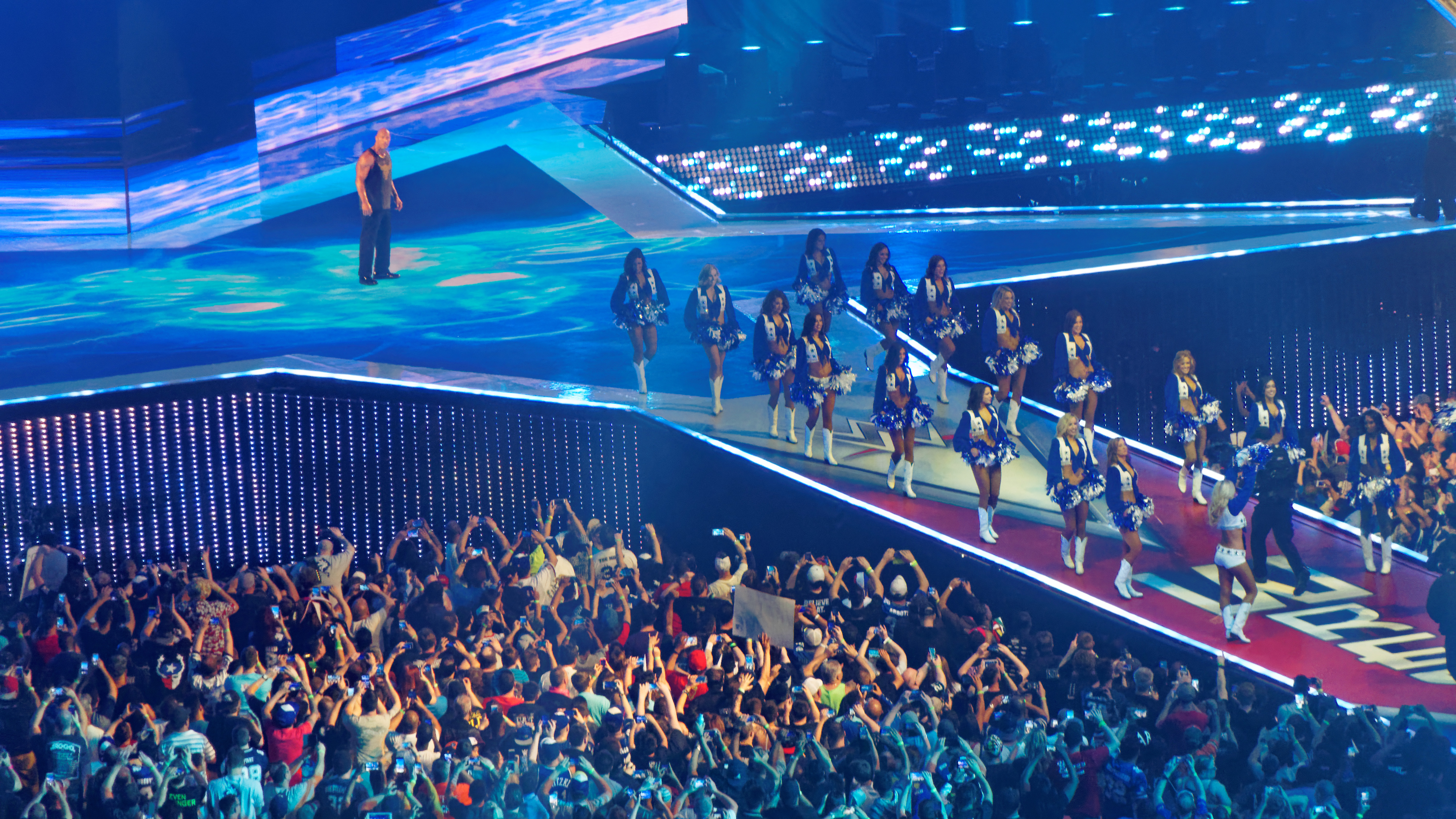

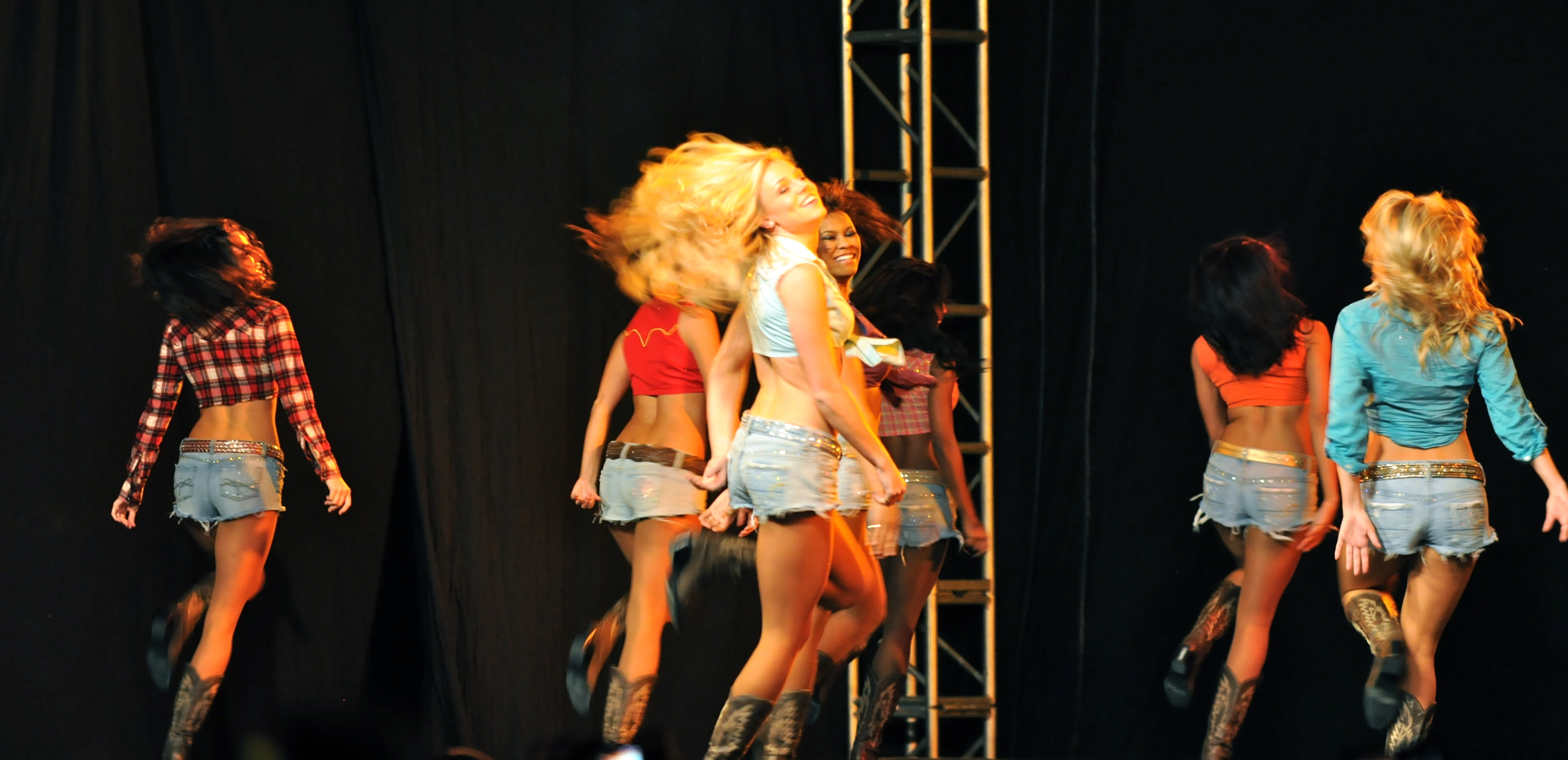

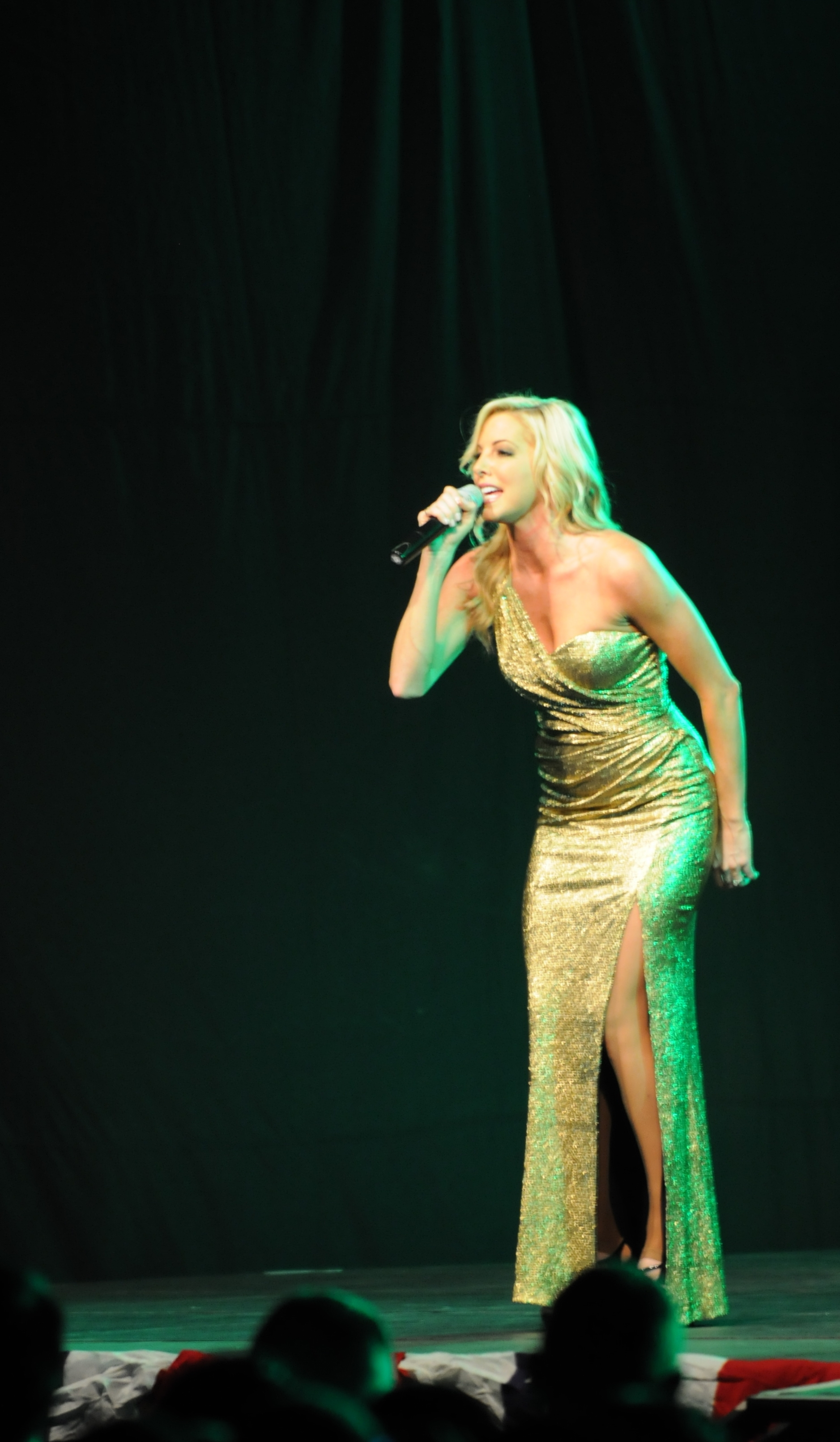

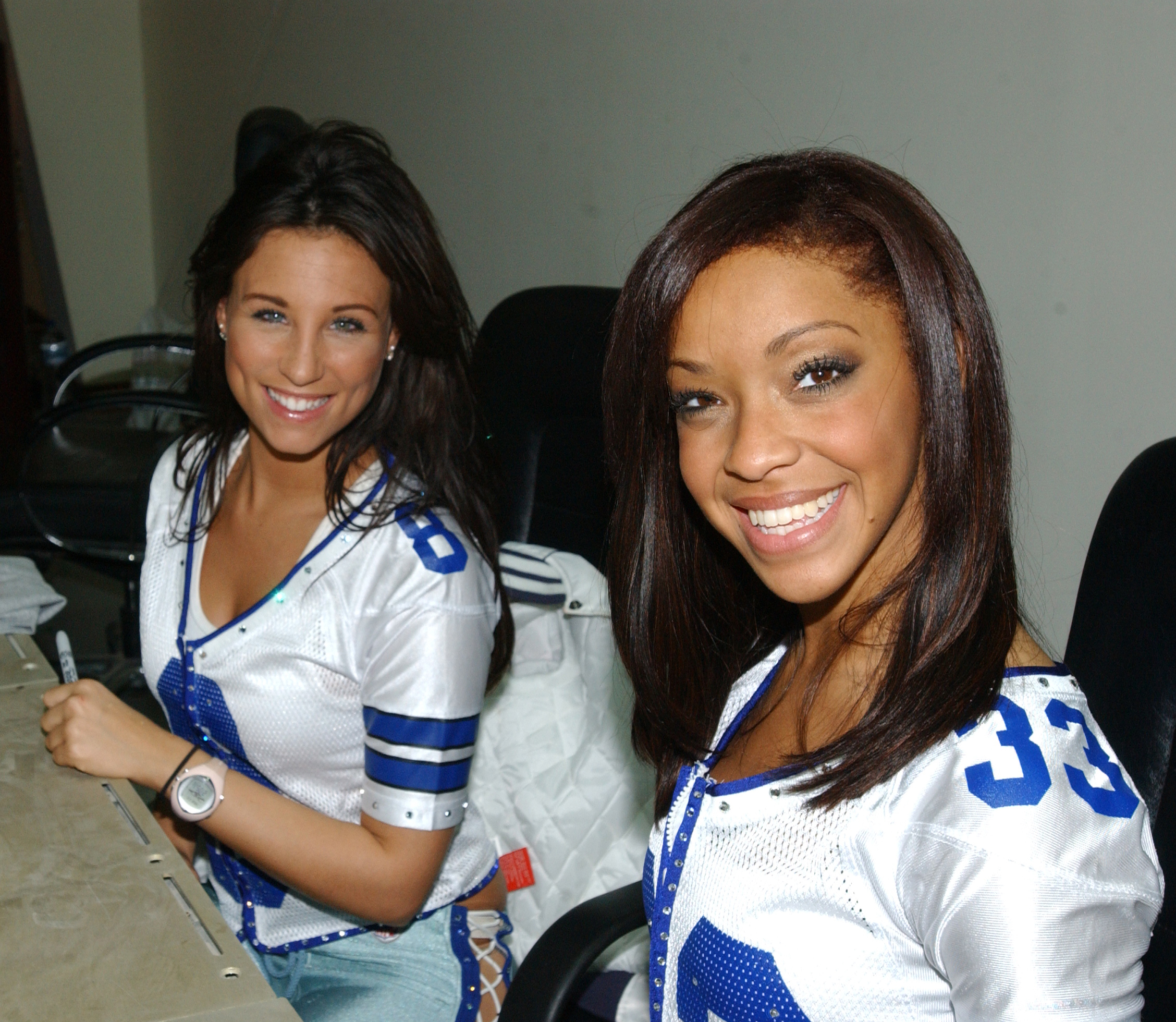

== Sources ==
- Shropshire, Mike (1997). The Ice Bowl. New York: D.I. Fine Books. ISBN 9781556115325. OCLC 37030686.
