= Reece Weaver =

American cheerleader

- Born: Reece Christinee Weaver; July 9, 2002 (age 24); Jacksonville, Florida, U.S.
- Education: University of Alabama (BA)
- Occupations: Dallas Cowboys Cheerleader; Actress; Author
- Years active: 2023–present
- Spouse: Will Allman (m. 2024)

Instagram information
- Page: reece_christinee
- Followers: 1.4 million
- Last updated: September 11, 2026

Reece Weaver (born July 9, 2002) is an American dancer, actress and author. She is a former Dallas Cowboys Cheerleader, best known for appearing on America's Sweethearts.

== Early life ==
Weaver was born in Jacksonville, Florida. She began dancing at the age of three and attended the performance art school Douglas Anderson School of the Arts. She received a Bachelor of Arts in Dance from the University of Alabama. During this time she was a member of the Alabama dance team.

In 2010, she became a Miss Sunshine Princess. In 2017, Weaver won Miss Florida's Outstanding Teen performing a jazz routine to "Don't Cry for Me Argentina". She later represented Jacksonville at the Miss America's Outstanding Teen and won a Best Dancer Award.

She is devoutly Christian, and attended church with her grandfather who was a pastor.

== Career ==
After graduating Weever auditioned to be a Dallas Cowboys Cheerleader (DCC) ahead of the 2023-24 NFL season. Her audition was documented as part of the Netflix series America's Sweethearts: Dallas Cowboys Cheerleaders. During her time at DCC she worked part time as a florist. After three years as a Dallas Cowboy Cheerleader Weaver retired.

Following her retirement from DCC she made her Broadway debut in September 2026, playing the role of Roxie Hart in Chicago. Due to her Christianity some lines were adapted for her.

Her book This Is Where You Bloom will be released in May 2027.

== Personal life ==
Weaver is married to her first boyfriend Will Allman. They met at university whilst she was with the Alabama Dance Team at a basketball game and became engaged in 2023. They were married in April 2024, with the DCC Cheerleaders performing.

As of September 2026, they reside in Tuscaloosa, Alabama.
