= Kelli Finglass =

American cheerleader

- Born: Kelli Cecile McGonagill; December 30, 1964 (age 61)
- Education: Texas Christian University, University of North Texas
- Occupations: Director of the Dallas Cowboys Cheerleaders, television personality, television producer
- Years active: 1991–present
- Spouse: Joel Finglass (m. 1996)
- Children: 2

Kelli Cecile McGonagill Finglass (born December 30, 1964) is an American dance director, television personality, producer, and retired dancer. She is the current director of the Dallas Cowboys Cheerleaders and a former member of the team. She appears in and is an executive producer of the CMT former reality series Dallas Cowboys Cheerleaders: Making the Team. She also appears alongside Judy Trammell on America's Sweethearts: Dallas Cowboys Cheerleaders on Netflix.

== Early life and education ==
Born Kelli McGonagill, Finglass is from Lindale, Texas, and graduated from Lindale High School. She danced and twirled from an early age. She continued her studies in Modern Dance at Texas Christian University, where she joined Alpha Delta Pi, and received a Bachelor of Arts in International Marketing from the University of North Texas.

== Career ==
Finglass was a member of the Dallas Cowboys Cheerleaders from 1984 to 1989, where she was the first cheerleader to be invited back without having to go through the customary audition process.

After leaving the squad in 1989, Finglass was hired by Jerry Jones as an assistant director to the DCC from 1989 to 1990. She then took a position in the sales and promotions department for the Dallas Cowboys and in 1991 was promoted to director of the Cheerleaders. As well as director, she also acts as business manager. She has expanded the organization, receiving many corporate sponsors and creating a business out of the DCC brand. She also has created and refined different competitions hosted by the Dallas Cowboys Cheerleaders, including the DCC Dance & Drill Team Competitions, Camp DCC, Cheers for Years, and Cheers for Fitness. She served as an executive producer for CMT's hit series Dallas Cowboys Cheerleaders: Making the Team which aired from 2006 to 2021.

Finglass also played herself in the film Dr. T & the Women.

== Personal life ==
Finglass has been married to Joel Finglass since 1996. The couple has a son, Ryan and a daughter named Samantha. They reside in Coppell, Texas. They attend Tambourine Church.
