= Bubbles Cash =

American dancer and actress

Essie Mae Cash, known by her stage name Bubbles Cash, is an American former burlesque dancer and film actress credited as a key inspiration for the Dallas Cowboys Cheerleaders team.

== Early life ==
Born in or around 1946, Cash grew up near Fort Worth on a dairy farm, and in Grand Prairie, aspiring to succeed Candy Barr as a famous Dallas stripper. She acquired the nickname Bubbles as a baby. In 1960 she was working as a carhop at the drive-through restaurant Sivils in Oak Cliff.

By her own account, Cash married at 15, but other sources give the age of 17; her husband was Vestal Earl McIntosh, known as Mack, a gangster and signwriter. In 1962, Cash left Sivils and began a career as a burlesque dancer. Soon after marrying, she had plastic surgery on her breasts (becoming "one of the first well-known women in Dallas who publicly acknowledged having augmented breasts"); had a child, Keiley; and began working at venues including The Theatre Lounge, The Colony Club, and The Calves Bar.

== Association with Dallas Cowboys ==
At the age of 20, on November 5, 1967, Cash attended a Dallas Cowboys home game against the Atlanta Falcons. Walking down an aisle carrying candy floss from a concessions stand, wearing a short skirt, Cash realised that she was attracting a lot of attention, including from print and television journalists, and did a small dance. This propelled her to fame, and she became the Dallas Cowboys' "unofficial mascot", given free tickets to appear regularly at home and at some away games. She is widely credited as a key inspiration for the development of the Dallas Cowboys Cheerleaders.

According to one fan who acquired her autograph, "the B in Bubbles was a pair of breasts with nipples. Her last name was a dollar sign".

== Politics ==
Cash ran for election as governor in 1968 as a "peace candidate" opposing the Vietnam War, and again in 1990, when her 3287 votes made her the most successful of the nineteen write-in candidates.

== Acting ==
According to the Internet Movie Database, Cash appeared in the films Hip Hot and 21 (1966), Hot Thrills and Warm Chills (1967), and Mars Needs Women (1968). However, a 2017 blogpost reported that Cash told her daughter Keiley Mink that she appeared only in the last of these, a claim that Mink repeated elsewhere. Jimmy McDonough established, however, that contemporary news reporting demonstrated that Cash did appear in Hot Thrills and Warm Chills, subsequently taking the producers to court for what she viewed as a breach of contract. Cash was, however, also cast in a film Swamp Lust and, according to the 2017 blogpost, appeared in the documentaries Mondo Texas and D.O.A.: A Rite Of Passage.

In Mars Needs Women, Cash played a stripper whom a team of Martians attempt to abduct to enable the perpetuation of the Martian people.

== Later life ==
John Eisenberg has characterised 1968 as "the peak of her fame". After 1968, Cash divorced her husband, moved to Los Angeles and Hawaii, and then back to Dallas, where she became a musician and opened a jewellery shop. According John Eisenberg, "when I tried to find her in 1996, her jewelry store had closed and none of her old bosses knew where she was", but Jimmy McDonough later published an interview with her along with extensive coverage of her daughter's life.
