= America's Sweethearts: Dallas Cowboys Cheerleaders =

- Genre: Docuseries
- Created by: Greg Whiteley
- Starring: Kelli Finglass; Judy Trammell; Charlotte Jones Anderson; Victoria Kalina; Kelcey Wetterberg; Reece Weaver; Kelly Villares; Charly Barby; Caroline Sundvold; Anna-Kate Sundvold; Jada McLean; Chandi Dayle; Kleine Powell; Faith Ward; Jenna Waller
- Country of origin: United States
- Original language: English
- No. of seasons: 3
- No. of episodes: 21

Production
- Executive producer: Andrew Fried
- Running time: 52–60 minutes
- Production companies: One Potato Productions; Boardwalk Pictures; Campfire Studios

Original release
- Network: Netflix
- Release: June 20, 2024 – present

Related
- Dallas Cowboys Cheerleaders: Making the Team

America's Sweethearts: Dallas Cowboys Cheerleaders is an American sport television docuseries which was released on Netflix on June 20, 2024. The seven-episode series follows the Dallas Cowboys Cheerleaders, the official cheer squad of the National Football League's Dallas Cowboys. The series follows the team selection process and digs into the thirty-six-person squad's daily life. It is considered to be the successor series for Dallas Cowboys Cheerleaders: Making the Team which aired on CMT from 2006 to 2021.

Season 2 premiered on June 18, 2025. In the second season, 23 out of 36 veterans are returning, resulting in the largest rookie class in the past five years.

Season 3 released on June 16, 2026 with 30 out of 36 veterans returning, leaving 6 spots open for rookies.

== Episodes ==
=== Series overview ===
Season	Episodes	Originally released
1	7	June 20, 2024
2	7	June 18, 2025
3	7	June 16, 2026

=== Season 1 (2024) ===
No. overall	No. in season	Title	Original release date
1	1	"Auditions Part 1"	June 20, 2024
Rookie candidates and returning veteran candidates compete for a spot in the 2023 training camp. Several auditions succeed by capturing the attention of the judges, while others fail to meet the standards.
2	2	"Auditions Part 2"	June 20, 2024
The 2023 training camp roster is announced, which includes the tearful cuts of three veteran candidates in order to make room for other candidates who exceeded the judges' expectations.
3	3	"Yes Ma'am"	June 20, 2024
After the rookie candidates receive makeovers, the girls hit the turf to learn the iconic pregame routine under the watchful eye of NFL hall-of-famer, Emmitt Smith.
4	4	"God Loves Dallas"	June 20, 2024
Candidates dance in the cowboy boots for the first time. With long deliberation, the final cuts are made and the 2023 squad is announced.
5	5	"Sparkle"	June 20, 2024
The newly announced squad makes final preparations ahead of their first preseason game. When group leaders are announced, one returning veteran struggles with her confidence.
6	6	"9 to 5"	June 20, 2024
Cheerleaders interact with fans and take the field for thanksgiving with special halftime guest Dolly Parton.
7	7	"Sisters for Life"	June 20, 2024
In the face of challenges, the sisterhood brings the cheerleaders together and alumni return for an emotional season finale.

=== Season 2 (2025) ===
No. overall	No. in season	Title	Original release date
8	1	"Promise Yourself Part 1"	June 18, 2025
9	2	"Promise Yourself Part 2"	June 18, 2025
10	3	"Someone's Daughter"	June 18, 2025
11	4	"At What Cost"	June 18, 2025
12	5	"The Happiest Girl In The Whole USA"	June 18, 2025
13	6	"Refresh and Reboot"	June 18, 2025
14	7	"Saturn Returns"	June 18, 2025

=== Season 3 (2026) ===
No. overall	No. in season	Title	Original release date
15	1	"Yes/No/Maybe, Part 1"	June 16, 2026
16	2	"Yes/No/Maybe, Part 2"	June 16, 2026
17	3	"Firecracker"	June 16, 2026
18	4	"Americana, Darling"	June 16, 2026
19	5	"Strong and Wrong"	June 16, 2026
20	6	"Baby, I'm a Star"	June 16, 2026
21	7	"Leap of Faith"	June 16, 2026

== Cast ==
- Note: Cheerleaders in **bold** indicate legacy cheerleaders (i.e. mother was previously a Dallas Cowboys cheerleader). Cheerleaders in italics indicate (first) group leaders. Cheerleaders underlined indicate not returning for the next season (putting uniform on the "No" rack at uniform return).

=== 2023 season (Season 1) ===
2023–24 Squad

Returning Veterans	Rookies	Training Camp Candidates	Retired / Cut / Resigned	Roles
Kally; Jessica; KayDianna; Kylie; Elli; Chandi; Amanda; **Victoria**; Zhenya; Darian; Armani; Sophy; Ashlinn; Megan; Dani; Jada; Jensen; Kelee; Marissa; Kleine; **Madeline**; Mckenzie; Tori; Karley; Rebecca; Lea; Kelcey; Claire	Taylor; Zoë; Brooklyn; McKenna; Kennedy; Camille; Anna Kate; Reece	Charly; Becca; Kaylin; Anisha; Ari; Leah; Darian; Kelly	Ashlee (retired); Marissa (retired); Kayla (cut); Christina (cut); Kat (retired); Kali (cut); Jalyn (retired); Caroline (retired); Tyra (retired)	Point: Kelcey, Claire; Pro Bowl 2024 Representative: Chandi; Rookie of the Year: Camille; Veteran of the Year: McKenzie

=== 2024 season (Season 2) ===
2024–25 Squad

Returning Veterans	Rookies	Training Camp Candidates	Retired / Cut / Resigned	Roles
Taylor; Zoë; Brooklyn; KayDianna; Kylie; Chandi; McKenna; Kennedy; Amanda; Armani; Sophy; Megan; Jada; Kelee; Marissa; Kleine; **Madeline**; Tori; Camille; Anna Kate; Karley; Lea; Reece; Kayla H.	Charly; Sophia; Ariel; Julissa; Darah; Allison; Madie; Ava; Trinity; Michelle; Abby; Kelly	Savannah; **Dayton**; Haydn; Clare Marie; Cooper; Kinsy; Jenna; Paris; Kayla G.	Kally (retired); Jessica (retired); Elli (retired); **Victoria** (retired); Zhenya (retired); Darian (retired); Ashlinn (retired); Dani (retired); Jensen (retired); Mckenzie (retired); Rebecca (retired); Kelcey (retired); Claire (retired)	Point: Chandi, Jada; Pro Bowl 2025 Representative: Megan; Rookie of the Year: Ariel; Veteran of the Year: Kayla

=== 2025 season (Season 3) ===
2025–26 Squad

Returning Veterans	Rookies	Training Camp Candidates	Retired / Cut / Resigned	Roles
Taylor; Brooklyn; Kylie; McKenna; Kennedy; Sophy; Megan; Kelee; Marissa; Kleine; **Madeline**; Tori; Camille; Anna Kate; Karley; Lea; Reece; Kayla H.; Charly; Sophia; Ariel; Julissa; Darah; Allison; Madie; Ava; Trinity; Michelle; Abby; Kelly	Jenna; Parker; Faith; Maddy; Brenley; Morgan	Emily R; Cooper; Savanna; Amaya; Tatum; Emily A; Brianne; Journi	Zoë (retired); KayDianna (retired); Chandi (retired); Amanda (retired); Armani (retired); Jada (retired)	Point: Megan, Kelee, Lea, Tori; Pro Bowl 2025 Representative: Lea; Rookie of the Year: Jenna; Veteran of the Year: Megan

== Critical reception ==
While the documentary has been considered a success, many viewers expressed shock at the demands on the cheerleaders, and the comparatively low wages they are paid, often requiring them to work multiple jobs.

In a mixed review, Judy Berman from Time stated the following: "A feminist-minded viewer could tie herself in knots trying to untangle the show's—and the squad's—gender politics, and [Greg] Whiteley deserves credit for doing justice to that complexity. Everyone who makes the team is shown to be a consummate athlete, possessing remarkable skill, strength, and discipline. The line separating physical fitness, a basic job requirement, from aesthetics can be thin. And contrary to what you might expect of beautiful women competing for the male gaze of a nation, the hopefuls come off as extraordinarily kind to and supportive of one another. Yet there isn't much institutional support for cheerleaders whose mental health or food issues are exacerbated by the stressful atmosphere of training camp."

== See also ==
- Dallas Cowboys Cheerleaders: Making the Team
- Cheer
- National Football League Cheerleading
