= Mars Needs Women =

1968 American TV film by Larry Buchanan

- DVD Cover
- Genre: Sci-fi
- Written by: Larry Buchanan
- Directed by: Larry Buchanan
- Starring: Tommy Kirk; Yvonne Craig
- Narrated by: Larry Buchanan
- Music by: Ronald Stein
- Country of origin: United States
- Original language: English

Production
- Producer: Larry Buchanan
- Cinematography: Robert Jessup
- Editor: Larry Buchanan
- Running time: 80 minutes
- Production company: Azalea Pictures
- Budget: $20,000 (estimate)

Original release
- Release: August 24, 1968

Mars Needs Women is a 1968 independently made American made-for-television science fiction film from Azalea Pictures. The film was produced, written, and directed by self-proclaimed schlock artist/auteur Larry Buchanan, and stars Tommy Kirk, Yvonne Craig, and Byron Lord. The film was released in first-run syndication by American International Pictures without a theatrical release.

== Plot ==
A U. S. military station in Houston, the United States Decoding Service (U.S.D.S.), NASA Wing, has intercepted a message from outer space. After decoding, the message contains only the cryptic statement: "Mars ... Needs ... Women".

Martians have developed a genetic deficiency that now produces only male children. A mission to Earth is launched, consisting of five Martian males, led by Dop (Tommy Kirk). Once here, their team intends to recruit Earth women to come to Mars to mate and produce female offspring, saving their civilization from extinction. Using their sophisticated transponder, Dop attempts to make contact with the U.S. military, which has now tracked the aliens' arrival on Earth.

The military eventually views the Martians as invaders, so the team takes on the guise of Earth men, acquiring human clothes, money, maps, and transportation. They finally select their prospective candidates, setting their sights on four American women: a homecoming queen, a stewardess, a stripper, and, most especially, a Pulitzer Prize-winning scientist, Dr. Bolen (Yvonne Craig), an expert in "space genetics". Resorting to hypnosis, they capture the women, but Dop quickly becomes enamored with Dr. Bolen; soon he is ready to sabotage their mission for her. After the military discovers their hideout, the Martians are forced to return home without their female captives. Mars still needs women.

== Cast ==
Main roles and screen credits:

- Tommy Kirk (as Dop, Martian Fellow #1/Mr. Fast, a Seattle Sun reporter)
- Yvonne Craig (as Dr. Marjorie Bolen)
- Warren Hammack (as Martian Doctor/Fellow #2)
- Tony Huston (as Martian Fellow #3, billed as Anthony Huston)
- Larry Tanner (as Martian Fellow #4)
- Cal Duggan (as Martian Fellow #5)
- Pat Delaney (as artist abductee)
- Sherry Roberts (as Brenda Knowlan, abductee)
- Donna Lindberg (as Stewardess, abductee)
- Bubbles Cash (as Stripper, abductee) (Note: Although an amateur actress, "Bubbles" Cash was a well-known Dallas area stripper.)
- Byron Lord (as Col. Bob Page, U.S.D.S.)
- Roger Ready (as Stimmons)
- Barnett Shaw (as Man at military conference)
- Neil Fletcher (as Secretary of Defense)
- Chet Davis (as network news reporter)
- Patrick Cranshaw (as Drunk on pier)

== Production ==
Using their "transponder" [sic], Dop, the Martian leader, wearing a poor-fitting skin diver's wet suit, materializes in the Space Center, attempting to explain his mission on Earth.

=== Development ===
Buchanan was making low budget films for AIP. He said he might've rejected an idea that AlP had and told them to call him back in an hour. "With Mars, I called Jim Nicholson with the opening. 'We get this signal from outer space... What is it, Mr. Nicholson, what is it?'. And I said, 'Mars Needs Women!' He said, 'When can you start?' It was almost like a fond throwback to the days at Columbia, when they'd just trust someone with a project. We had a low-budget profile like an old Hawks movie. I don't put myself in the same class, but I do admire them and know how they worked with their bosses".

John Ashley, who had just made The Eye Creatures (1965) for Buchanan, says he was meant to play the lead role but got busy on another project, so Kirk then stepped in.

Kirk recalled "that was a period of my life when I was completely at loose ends. I was out of money, and I did anything anybody offered me. All big mistakes. You can't do that. You must be selective." Kirk called the film "undoubtedly one of the stupidest motion pictures ever made. How I got talked into it, I don't know".

Kirk had previously played a Martian seeking Earth women in AIP's Pajama Party (1964). He had made his mark as a Disney child star, but after being fired, was hoping to revive his career with Mars Needs Women treating it as a serious project, to the extent of rewriting some of his dialogue.

Reportedly, Buchanan allowed Kirk to create his own soliloquy for his scene in a planetarium (at Dallas Fair Park) as he explains that his world is dying. (Note: On the laserdisc commentary, Kirk elaborated that his speech was an homage to the address to Earth by Michael Rennie in the earlier classic The Day the Earth Stood Still (1951).)

The other notable lead, Yvonne Craig, had starred in several films, (Note: Craig's resume included starring with Elvis Presley, as well as being featured in many television roles.) and numerous television roles, including her portrayal of Batgirl in the ABC TV series Batman.

=== Shooting ===
Over a two-week shooting schedule, Buchanan shot Mars Needs Women in his hometown of Dallas, pretending it to be Houston. Faced with his usual meager budget, he resorted to using available spaces, including office buildings, to serve as NASA headquarters. Typical shoddy "B" movie production values are evident throughout the film. Southland Life Insurance Building is clearly visible as the Martians drive among the humans. Other prominent Dallas landmarks, including Southern Methodist University, are also featured. Footage from a SMU Homecoming game is used, and the Homecoming Queen is one of the Martian's "recruits". Footage was also shot at Dallas Fair Park (Planetarium, Lagoon, and Science Building). Additional footage was shot at Dallas Love Field, where a man is shown reading the Houston Chronicle, and at the Gypsy Room on Harry Hines Blvd. One scene with dancer Bubbles Cash was shot at an actual Dallas striptease bar The Athens Strip, located on what is now Lower Greenville Ave. Other scenes were shot inside the empty White Rock Lake Pumphouse, once used when the lake was a city water source (the City of Dallas Water Dept eventually converted the building to offices on the southwest end of White Rock Lake). The scene at the NASA "Space Center" was filmed in Richardson, Texas, north of Dallas, in the Antenna Building, which belonged to Collins Radio, a NASA contractor; their large radio satellite dish antennas can be seen in some background shots.

Mars Needs Women is padded with long sequences taken from stock aviation footage (the North American X-15 spacecraft being launched from its Boeing NB-52B Stratofortress mother ship and General Dynamics F-111 fighter-bomber in particular). Due to poor lighting, parts of the film were made by undercranking the camera and having the actors move slower, sometimes shooting at 18 or 12 frames per second instead of the usual 24. Actors also stretched out scenes with long sequences with no dialogue, either walking or doing menial tasks. One lengthy scene involves the camera focused on a loudspeaker.

== Critical reception ==
A review of the film in TV Guide reported that "Cheap, amateurish, and dull are words that don't even come close to defining this sci-fi mess. It may be considered as one of those films that represents Hollywood filmmaking at its worst." Film critic Richard Scheib wrote that "there is no particular plot to the film," but that "there is a certain amusement to be found in some of the Martian takes on Earth culture" and "the most unintentionally funny scenes in the film feature Tommy Kirk [...] like his intense and over-the-top attempts to provide the narration when the soundtrack at a planetarium breaks down or his hilarious cliche declaration of love for Yvonne Craig."

Although originally intended for theatrical release, Mars Needs Women was distributed directly to television.

== Legacy ==
One of the film's more notable fans was Frank Zappa, who referenced the film in the title of an instrumental composition, "Manx Needs Women" (a pun on the inhabitants of the Isle of Man), which was regularly performed by Zappa in concert in 1976; recordings of the song's performances appear on Zappa's albums Zappa In New York and Philly '76.

Musician Peter Wolf released a song of the same name on his 1984 album, Lights Out.

Samples from the film appear in the track "Mars Needs Women" by Meat Beat Manifesto, the B-side of the God O.D. single in 1988. The track itself was resampled on track 4 of the Chemical Brothers remix album Brothers Gonna Work It Out.

The introduction to the 1988 hit record "Pump Up the Volume" by the group MARRS ("Mars ... needs ... women ...!") is taken from the film's original preview trailer.

On Béla Fleck and the Flecktones' eponymous 1990 debut album there is a two-song song cycle "Mars Needs Women: Space is a Lonely Place" and "Mars Needs Women: They're Here."

The demo release of the 1994 game Marathon contained a level named after the film. It was included as a network-only level in the final release, and again in the sequel Marathon Infinity.

Heavy metal musician Rob Zombie released a song of the same name on his 2010 album, Hellbilly Deluxe 2.

Tonio K. wrote and recorded a song of the same name, with sarcastic lyrics detailing the end of a tempestuous love affair. The song appears on his 1998 album Rodent Weekend '76-'96 (Approximately).

== Proposed sequel ==
In the early 1990s Buchanan announced a sequel was in development at Universal Pictures with John Avnet and Jordan Kerner. It was intended to be "a sophisticated romantic comedy based on the ideas first set forth in the original". The film was never made.

== See also ==
- Devil Girl from Mars (1954); a gender-reversed version of the same theme
- List of American films of 1967
- List of films featuring extraterrestrials
- Mars in fiction
- Mars Needs Moms (2011)
