= Dallas Cowboys Cheerleaders: Making the Team =

American reality television series (2006–2021)

- Genre: Reality
- Country of origin: United States
- Original language: English
- No. of seasons: 16
- No. of episodes: 140

Production
- Executive producers: Stu Schreiberg; Stephen Kroopnick; Eugene Pack; Peter Zasuly; Charlotte Jones; Kelli McGonagill Finglass; Jacquelyn French; Laurie Sharpe
- Camera setup: Multi-camera
- Production companies: Triage Entertainment; CMT Productions

Original release
- Network: CMT
- Release: September 29, 2006 – November 27, 2021

Related
- NFL Cheerleader Playoffs; America's Sweethearts: Dallas Cowboys Cheerleaders

Dallas Cowboys Cheerleaders: Making the Team is an American reality television series that aired on CMT from September 29, 2006, to November 27, 2021. The series follows the auditioning process and the forming of the Dallas Cowboys' annual Cheerleading squad. The series features director Kelli McGonagill Finglass and choreographer Judy Trammell.

In April 2022, it was reported that CMT canceled the series after 16 seasons. A successor series, America's Sweethearts: Dallas Cowboys Cheerleaders was ordered by Netflix and premiered on June 20, 2024.

== Summary ==
The show tracks the progression of women who are in the audition process of trying to become a Dallas Cowboys Cheerleader. The show begins at Texas Stadium (Seasons 1–3), then moves with the team to AT&T Stadium in subsequent seasons: first the open audition "cattle call", then the five-person audition "cut-down", followed by personal interviews, uniform fittings, BMI testing, physical fitness testing, etiquette training, mock media interviews, and calendar shoots. Successful candidates must also complete a knowledge test on various subjects including, but not limited to: the Dallas Cowboys and their history, NFL Football in general and the rules of the game, general history, government, and current events.

There is also the dance choreography that tests each woman's capacity to grasp dance combinations and perform the trademark kick-line/jump-split routine for which the Dallas Cowboys Cheerleaders is known.

Women are judged by a hand-picked panel of experts, and scoring is based on physical appearance, physical fitness, dance style, poise, grace, intelligence, and showmanship.

Once training camp opens, the women are put through a program of elite dance training and physical conditioning that is comparable to some professional sports training programs. If a contestant is struggling, she is called into Finglass' office to discuss the nature of her difficulty and is generally given an opportunity to correct the shortcoming(s) to avoid being dismissed ("cut") from the squad.

Due to Covid protocols, auditions went virtual in 2020, and have remained so through 2021, with finals held in-person.

== Cast ==
- Note: Cheerleaders in **bold** indicate legacy cheerleaders (i.e. mother was previously a Dallas Cowboys cheerleader). Cheerleaders in italics indicate (first) group leaders.

=== 2021 season (Season 16) ===
2021–22 Squad

Returning Veterans	Rookies	Retired / Cut / Resigned	Roles / Awards	Show Group
Jessica Bowman; Elli DiGiovanni; Chandi Dayle; Ashlee Ford; Marissa Garrison; Taylor Johnson; Darian Lassiter; Armani Latimer; Gina Ligi; Dani McGinnis; Jada McLean; Amber McMillan; Madeline Molloy; Kat Puryear; Erin Sauerhage; McKenzie Sherman; Jalyn Stough; Lexie Sullivan; Caroline Sundvold; Kristin Dodd; Kelcey Wetterberg; Claire Wolford; Rachel Wyatt	KayDianna Davis; Amber Laiche; Ashlinn Maze; Megan McElaney; Jensen Merrill; Tyra Thompson; Kelee Norris; Christina Ostovich; Kleine Powell; **Madeline Salter**; Tori Skillings; Rebecca Troyak; Lea Tunnell	Rachel Alexander (retired); Briana Baisden (retired); Amanda Dilks (resigned); Tess Guidry (retired); Sydney Hawthorne (retired); Savannah Heineken (retired); Daphne Janes (Left due to injury); **Victoria Kalina** (took a hiatus); Cianna Levi (retired); Maddie Massingill (retired); Lisa Mills (left due to injury); Alora-Rose Morgan (mutually resigned); Alanna Tarango (retired)	Point: Gina Ligi & Rachel Wyatt; Pro Bowl 2022 Representative: Lexie Sullivan; Rookie of the Year: Kelee Norris; Veteran of the Year: Rachel Wyatt	KayDianna Davis; Chandi Dayle; Ashlee Ford; Marissa Garrison; Darian Lassiter; Armani Latimer; Gina Ligi; Amber McMillian; Kat Puryear; Mckenzie Sherman; Tori Skillings; Lexie Smith; Jalyn Stough; Caroline Sundvold; Tyra Thompson; Kelcey Wetterberg; Claire Wolford; Rachel Wyatt

=== 2020 season (Season 15) ===
2020–21 Squad (Note: The 2020 season of Dallas Cowboys Cheerleaders: Making The Team took place in a "quarantine bubble" due to the COVID-19 pandemic. All auditions were done online with training camp taking place in person with the needed measurements.)

Returning Veterans	Rookies	Retired / Cut / Resigned	Roles / Awards	Show Group
Rachel Alexander; Briana Baisden; Chandi McCright; Amanda Dilks; Ashlee Ford; Tess Guidry; Savannah Heineken; Daphne Janes; Taylor Johnson; **Victoria Kalina**; Cianna Levi; Gina Ligi; Maddie Massingill; Lisa Mills; Madeline Molloy; Amber McMillan; Kat Puryear; Erin Sauerhage; Jalyn Stough; Lexie Sullivan; Caroline Sundvold; Alanna Tarango; Kristin Dodd; Kelcey Wetterberg; Rachel Wyatt	Jessica Bowman; Elli DiGiovanni; Marissa Garrison; Sydney Hawthorne; Darian Lassiter; Armani Latimer; Dani McGinnis; Jada McLean; Alora-Rose Morgan; Mckenzie Sherman; Claire Wolford	Hannah Anderson (cut); Brennan Cook (cut); Bridget Jacob (retired); Lily Johnson (cut); Amy Leonall (retired); Meredith Madden (cut); Molly Neumeister (retired); Heather O'Connor (retired); Taylor Pedersen (retired); Alexis Peterson (retired); Christina Riccelli (retired); Miranda Tims (retired)	Point: Maddie Massingill & Rachel Wyatt; Pro Bowl 2021 Representative: N/A; Rookie of the Year: McKenzie Sherman; Veteran of the Year: Gina Ligi	Rachel Alexander; Chandi Dayle; Amanda Dilks; Ashlee Ford; Marissa Garrison; Tess Guidry; Daphne Janes; **Victoria Kalina**; Gina Ligi; Maddie Massingill; Amber McMillian; Erin Sauerhage; Lexie Smith; Caroline Sundvold; Kelcey Wetterberg; Claire Wolford; Rachel Wyatt

=== 2019 season (Season 14) ===
2019–20 Squad

Returning Veterans	Rookies	Retired / Cut	Roles / Awards	Show Group
Rachel Alexander; Hannah Anderson; Briana Baisden; Brennan Cook; Ashlee Ford; Tess Guidry; Savannah Heineken; Bridget Jacob; Daphne Janes; Taylor Johnson; Amy Leonall; Cianna Levi; Gina Ligi; Maddie Massingill; Madeline Molloy; Amber McMillan; Molly Neumeister; Heather O'Connor; Alexis Peterson; Christina Riccelli; Erin Sauerhage; Jalyn Stough; Lexie Sullivan; Caroline Sundvold; Alanna Tarango; Miranda Tims; Rachel Wyatt	Amanda Dilks; Lily Johnson; **Victoria Kalina**; Meredith Madden; Chandi McCright; Lisa Mills; Taylor Pedersen; Kat Puryear; Kristin Dodd; Kelcey Wetterberg	Khalyn Cole (retired); Tasha Cruz (retired); KaShara Garrett (retired); Gabby Goduco (cut); Yuko Kawata (retired); Lacey Munoz (retired); Lauren Parker (retired); Jessika Palmer (retired); Kelli Sullivan (retired)	Point: Amy Leonall & Maddie Massingill; Pro Bowl 2020 Representative: Amy Leonall; Rookie of the Year: Kelcey Wetterberg; Veteran of the Year: Bridget Jacob	Rachel Alexander; Hannah Anderson; Amanda Dilks; Ashlee Ford; Tess Guidry; Bridget Jacob; Daphne Janes; **Victoria Kalina**; Amy Leonall; Cianna Levi; Gina Ligi; Maddie Massingill; Amber McMillian; Heather O’Connor; Lexie Smith; Caroline Sundvold; Kelcey Wetterberg; Rachel Wyatt

=== 2018 season (Season 13) ===
2018–19 Squad

Returning Veterans	Rookies	Retired / Cut / Resigned	Roles / Awards	Show Group
Rachel Alexander; Khalyn Cole; Tasha Cruz; KaShara Garrett; Tess Guidry; Savannah Heineken; Yuko Kawata; Amy Leonall; Gina Ligi; Maddie Massingill; Lacey Munoz; Molly Neumeister; Heather O'Connor; Lauren Parker; Jessika Palmer; Alexis Peterson; Christina Riccelli; Kelli Sullivan; Lexie Sullivan; Miranda Tims	Hannah Anderson; Briana Baisden; Brennan Cook; Ashlee Ford; Gabby Goduco; Bridget Jacob; Daphne Janes; Taylor Johnson; Cianna Levi; Amber McMillan; Madeline Molloy; Erin Sauerhage; Jalyn Stough; Caroline Sundvold; Alanna Tarango; Rachel Wyatt	Cersten Bradley (retired); Simone Culwell (retired); Jinelle Davidson (retired); Selina Flores (cut); Keyra Ford (cut); Jenna Jackson (retired); Chantel Jones (retired); Stephanie Larson (retired); Kelsey Lowrance (retired); Robin Richardson (retired); Maggie Rouse (retired); Tara Szybillo (cut); Elizabeth Voegtle (retired)	Point: KaShara Garrett; Pro Bowl 2019 Representative: Lacey Munoz; Rookie of the Year: Caroline Sundvold; Veteran of the Year: Heather O'Connor	Hannah Anderson; Khalyn Cole; Tasha Cruz; KaShara Garrett; Tess Guidry; Bridget Jacob; Daphne Janes; Amy Leonall; Gina Ligi; Maddie Massingill; Amber McMillan; Lacey Munoz; Heather O'Connor; Lauren Parker; Kelli Sullivan; Lexie Sullivan; Jalyn Stough

=== 2017 season (Season 12) ===
2017-18 Squad

Returning Veterans	Rookies	Retired / Cut / Resigned	Roles / Awards	Show Group
Cersten Bradley; Milan Brahney (resigned mid-season); Khalyn Cole; Tasha Cruz; Simone Culwell; Jinelle Davidson; Selina Flores; KaShara Garrett; Tess Guidry; Jenna Jackson; Chantel Jones; Yuko Kawata; Stephanie Larson; Amy Leonall; Kelsey Lowrance; Maddie Massingill; Lacey Munoz; Heather O'Connor; Jessika Palmer; Robin Richardson; Maggie Rouse; Kelli Sullivan; Elizabeth Voegtle	Rachel Alexander; Savannah Heineken; Keyra Ford; Gina Ligi; Molly Neumeister; Lauren Parker; Alexis Peterson; Christina Riccelli; Kalyssa Singleton (resigned mid-season); Alexandria Stavropoulos (resigned prior to season start); Lexie Sullivan; Tara Szybillo; Miranda Tims	Jennifer Amburn (retired); Danielle Barhold (retired); Claire Brown (retired); Megan Carcioppolo (retired); Allie Droste (cut); Heather Hamilton (cut); Holly Powell (resigned); Jessica Purdy (retired); Raylee Stearman (cut); Jaclyn Tisdale (retired); Amy Trader (retired); Mandy Voecks (retired); Melissa Wallace (retired); Erica Wilkins (left due to injury) (Note: In June 2018, Wilkins sued the organisation for lost wages, calling for increased pay for members. Lawsuit was settled in September 2019 resulting in increase in "cheerleader pay from $8 an hour to $12, and doubled...game-day pay from $200 to $400.")	Point: KaShara Garrett; Pro Bowl 2018 Representative: KaShara Garrett; Rookie of the Year: Savannah Heineken; Veteran of the Year: Robin Richardson	Cersten Bradley; Tasha Cruz; Jinelle Davidson; KaShara Garrett; Jenna Jackson; Stephanie Larson; Amy Leonall; Gina Ligi; Maddie Massingill; Lacey Munoz; Heather O'Connor; Lauren Parker; Robin Richardson; Maggie Rouse; Kalyssa Singleton; Kelli Sullivan

=== 2016 season (Season 11) ===
2016–17 Squad

Returning Veterans	Rookies	Retired / Cut / Resigned	Roles / Awards	Show Group
Jennifer Amburn; Danielle Barhold; Claire Brown; Megan Carcioppolo; Simone Culwell; Jinelle Davidson; KaShara Garrett; Jenna Jackson; Chantel Jones; Stephanie Larson; Amy Leonall; Lacey Munoz; Holly Powell; Jessica Purdy; Robin Richardson; Raylee Stearman; Jaclyn Tisdale; Amy Trader; Elizabeth Voegtle; Melissa Wallace; Erica Wilkins	Cersten Bradley; Milan Brahney; Khalyn Cole; Tasha Cruz; Allie Droste; Selina Flores; Tess Guidry; Heather Hamilton; Yuko Kawata; Kelsey Lowrance; Maddie Massingill; Heather O'Connor; Jessika Palmer; Maggie Rouse; Kelli Sullivan; Mandy Voecks	Kelsey Bond (retired); Victoria Carriere (retired); Paige Cavalieri (resigned in May 2016) (Note: Cavalieri met Jeff Heath, in 2013, became engaged in December 2016, and were married in March 2018.); Mary Dill (retired); Ashley Holland (retired); Holly Hubbard (retired); Rachel Lunsford (retired); Angela Nicotera (retired); Loren Roeder (retired); Kat Rogers (cut); Kinzie Rusco (retired); Jacie Scott (retired) (Note: Scott later was a Rockette from 2017-19.); Caila Sims (cut)	Point: Jennifer Amburn; Pro Bowl 2017 Representative: Jennifer Amburn; Rookie of the Year: Heather O'Connor; Veteran of the Year: Jessica Purdy	Jennifer Amburn; Claire Brown; Megan Carcioppolo; Jinelle Davidson; Jenna Jackson; Maddie Massingill; Lacey Munoz; Holly Powell; Jessica Purdy; Robin Richardson; Maggie Rouse; Kelli Sullivan; Jaclyn Tisdale; Amy Trader; Mandy Voecks; Melissa Wallace; Erica Wilkins

=== 2015 season (Season 10) ===
2015–16 Squad

Returning Veterans	Rookies	Retired / Cut / Resigned	Roles / Awards	Show Group
Jennifer Amburn; Danielle Barhold; Kelsey Bond; Victoria Carriere; Paige Cavalieri; Jinelle Davidson; Mary Dill; Ashley Holland; Holly Hubbard; Jenna Jackson; Rachel Lunsford; Lacey Munoz; Angela Nicotera; Jessica Purdy; Loren Roeder; Kinzie Rusco; Jacie Scott; Caila Sims; Melissa Wallace; Erica Wilkins	Claire Brown; Megan Carcioppolo; Simone Culwell; KaShara Garrett; Chantel Jones; Stephanie Larson; Amy Leonall; Holly Powell; Robin Richardson; Kat Rogers; Raylee Stearman; Jaclyn Tisdale; Amy Trader; Elizabeth Voegtle	Abby Bertrand (retired); Nicole Bulcher (retired); Samantha Clark (retired); Jennifer Colvin (retired); Jordan Daigle (retired); Sydney Durso (retired); Emma Dutton (retired); Ashley Ferrel (retired); Katy Fink (retired); Jasmine Goode (cut) (Note: Goode later appeared on season 21 of The Bachelor.); Jessica Kalil (retired); Veronica Lind (retired); Ashley Prochazka (cut); Courtney Russ (retired); Brittney Schram (retired); Breelan Statham (cut)	Point: Holly Hubbard; Pro Bowl 2016 Representative: Holly Hubbard; Rookie of the Year: KaShara Garrett; Veteran of the Year: Holly Hubbard	Jennifer Amburn; Kelsey Bond; Megan Carcioppolo; Jinelle Davidson; Mary Dill; Ashley Holland; Holly Hubbard; Jenna Jackson; Rachel Lunsford; Lacey Munoz; Holly Powell; Jessica Purdy; Kinzie Rusco; Jacie Scott; Amy Trader; Melissa Wallace; Erica Wilkins

=== 2014 season (Season 9) ===
2014–15 Squad

Returning Veterans	Rookies	Retired / Cut / Resigned	Roles / Awards	Show Group
Jennifer Amburn; Danielle Barhold; Abby Bertrand; Kelsey Bond; Nicole Bulcher; Paige Cavalieri; Samantha Clark; Jennifer Colvin; Jordan Daigle; Jinelle Davidson; Sydney Durso; Emma Dutton; Ashley Ferrel; Katy Fink; Jasmine Goode; Ashley Holland; Holly Hubbard; Jenna Jackson; Jessica Kalil; Veronica Lind; Rachel Lunsford; Angela Nicotera; Jessica Purdy; Kinzie Rusco; Brittney Schram; Jacie Scott	Victoria Carriere; Mary Dill; Lacey Munoz; Ashley Prochazka; Loren Roeder; Courtney Russ; Caila Sims; Breelan Statham; Melissa Wallace; Erica Wilkins	Jacqueline Bob (retired); Mia Greenhouse (retired); Alex Hermes (cut); Morgan Jordan (cut); Mackenzie Weeks (retired); Carisa McMillan (retired); Kaitlyn Phillips (retired); Olivia Sharber (retired) (Note: Sharber was briefly married to Cassidy Carter, son of Kitty Carter.) (Note: Sharber performs annually as an ensemble member in the Radio City Christmas Spectacular.); Amelia Smith (retired); Kim Tong (retired); Courtni Wedeman (cut); Hannah West (cut); Lauren Williams (retired)	Point: Holly Hubbard; Pro Bowl 2015 Representative: Nicole Bulcher; Rookie of the Year: Mary Dill; Veteran of the Year: Nicole Bulcher	Jennifer Amburn; Kelsey Bond; Samantha Clark; Jennifer Colvin; Jinelle Davidson; Sydney Durso; Emma Dutton; Ashley Holland; Holly Hubbard; Jenna Jackson; Lacey Munoz; Jessica Purdy; Kinzie Rusco; Brittney Schram; Jacie Scott; Melissa Wallace; Erica Wilkins

=== 2013 season (Season 8) ===
2013–14 Squad

Returning Veterans	Rookies	Retired / Cut / Resigned	Roles / Awards	Show Group
Danielle Barhold; Jacqueline Bob; Kelsey Bond; Nicole Bulcher; Jennifer Colvin; Jordan Daigle; Sydney Durso; Emma Dutton; Ashley Ferrel; Katy Fink; Mia Greenhouse; Jasmine Goode; Alex Hermes; Holly Hubbard; Jenna Jackson; Veronica Lind; Carisa McMillan; Angela Nicotera; Jessica Purdy; Kinzie Rusco; Brittney Schram; Jacie Scott; Olivia Sharber; Amelia Smith; Kim Tong; Lauren Williams; Mackenzie Weeks	Jennifer Amburn; Abby Bertrand; Paige Cavalieri; Samantha Clark; Jinelle Davidson; Ashley Holland; Morgan Jordan; Jessica Kalil; Rachel Lunsford; Kaitlyn Phillips; Courtni Wedeman; Hannah West	Colleen Brent (retired); Chelsea Chaney (cut); Emily Claire (retired); Courtney Cook (retired); Kali Drake (cut); Teri George (cut); Alexandra Gandara (retired); Whitney Isleib (retired); Melissa Kellerman (retired); Meagan McVay (retired); Collin Sarvis (cut); **Cassie Trammell** (retired)	Point: Mia Greenhouse; Pro Bowl 2014 Representative: Jacqueline Bob; Rookie of the Year: Jennifer Amburn; Veteran of the Year: Lauren Williams	Jennifer Amburn; Jacqueline Bob; Kelsey Bond; Samantha Clark; Jennifer Colvin; Sydney Durso; Emma Dutton; Mia Greenhouse; Ashely Holland; Holly Hubbard; Jenna Jackson; Carisa McMillan; Kinzie Rusco; Brittney Schram; Jacie Scott; Olivia Sharber; Lauren Williams; Mackenzie Weeks; Hannah West

=== 2012 season (Season 7) ===
2012–13 Squad

Returning Veterans	Rookies	Retired / Cut / Resigned	Roles / Awards	Show Group
Jacqueline Bob; Colleen Brent; Nicole Bulcher; Courtney Cook; Sydney Durso; Emma Dutton; Katy Fink; Alexandra Gandara; Mia Greenhouse; Holly Hubbard; Whitney Isleib; Melissa Kellerman; Veronica Lind; Meagan McVay; Angela Nicotera; Brittney Schram; Amelia Smith; **Cassie Trammell**; Mackenzie Weeks; Lauren Williams	Danielle Barhold; Kelsey Bond; Chelsea Chaney; Emily Claire; Jennifer Colvin; Jordan Daigle; Kali Drake; Ashley Ferrel; Teri George; Jasmine Goode; Alex Hermes; Jenna Jackson; Carisa McMillan; Jessica Purdy; Kinzie Rusco; Collin Sarvis; Jacie Scott; Olivia Sharber; Kim Tong	Sasha Agent (retired); Jenna Brooks (cut); Sunni Cranfill (retired); Cassie Dyson (cut); Brittany Evans (retired); Kaitlin Ilseng (retired); Ann Lux (retired); Meghan Phillips (cut); Kelsi Reich (retired); Amber Smith (retired); Kamilah Todd (cut); Alyssa Torres (cut); Ashton Torres (retired); Ally Traylor (retired)	Point: Whitney Isleib; Pro Bowl 2013 Representative: Whitney Isleib; Rookie of the Year: Jacie Scott; Veteran of the Year: Jacqueline Bob	Jacqueline Bob; Jennifer Colvin; Sydney Durso; Mia Greenhouse; Holly Hubbard; Whitney Isleib; Jenna Jackson; Melissa Kellerman; Meagan McVay; Brittney Schram; Jacie Scott; Olivia Sharber; Cassie Trammell; Lauren Williams

=== 2011 season (Season 6) ===
2011–12 Squad

Returning Veterans	Rookies	Retired / Cut / Resigned	Roles / Awards	Show Group
Sasha Agent; Jacqueline Bob; Nicole Bulcher; Sunni Cranfill; Sydney Durso; Brittany Evans; Mia Greenhouse; Kaitlin Ilseng; Whitney Isleib; Melissa Kellerman; Ann Lux; Meagan McVay; Kelsi Reich; Ashton Torres; **Cassie Trammell**; Ally Traylor; Lauren Williams	Colleen Brent; Jenna Brooks; Courtney Cook; Emma Dutton; Cassie Dyson; Katy Fink; Alexandra Gandara; Holly Hubbard; Veronica Lind; Angela Nicotera; Meghan Phillips; Brittney Schram; Amber Smith; Amelia Smith; Kamilah Todd; Alyssa Torres; Mackenzie Weeks	Evan Anderson (retired); Jordan Baum (retired); Jordan Chanley (retired); Carey DePasquale (retired); Stephanie Heymann (retired); Michelle Keys (retired) (Note: Keys now helps choreograph game day routines for the Dallas Cowboys cheerleaders); Kaitlin LeGrand (cut); Joannah Liad (retired); **Meredith Oden** (retired); Tobie Percival (retired); Alyssa Sarasani (retired); Meagan Sharp (retired); Brooke Sorenson (retired); Olivia Stevanovski (cut); Crystal Trevino (retired); Trisha Trevino (retired); Tia Williams (retired)	Point: Whitney Isleib; Pro Bowl 2012 Representative: Ally Traylor; Rookie of the Year: Holly Hubbard; Veteran of the Year: Brittany Evans	Jacqueline Bob; Sunni Cranfill; Sydney Durso; Emma Dutton; Cassie Dyson; Brittany Evans; Mia Greenhouse; Holly Hubbard; Whitney Isleib; Melissa Kellerman; Meagan McVay; Kelsi Reich; Alyssa Torres; Ashton Torres; Cassie Tramell; Ally Traylor

=== 2010 season (Season 5) ===
2010–11 Squad

Returning Veterans	Rookies	Retired / Cut / Resigned	Roles / Awards	Show Group
Evan Anderson; Jordan Baum; Jacqueline Bob; Jordan Chanley; Sunni Cranfill; Carey DePasquale; Sydney Durso; Brittany Evans; Mia Greenhouse; Kaitlin Ilseng; Whitney Isleib; Melissa Kellerman; Michelle Keys; Joannah Liad; Meagan McVay; **Meredith Oden**; Tobie Percival; Kelsi Reich; Meagan Sharp; Brooke Sorenson; Ashton Torres; **Cassie Trammell**; Ally Traylor; Crystal Trevino; Trisha Trevino; Tia Williams	Sasha Agent; Nicole Bulcher; Stephanie Heymann; Kaitlin LeGrand; Ann Lux; Alyssa Sarasani; Olivia Stevanovski; Lauren Williams	Kristen Gauthier (retired); Sarah Gourley (retired); Nicole Hamilton (retired); Brandi Kilby (retired); Abigail Klein (retired); Vanessa Jenkins (retired); Malia Morales (retired); Justine Phillips-Orf (retired); Amy Reese (cut)	Point: Crystal Trevino; Pro Bowl 2011 Representative: Brittany Evans; Rookie of the Year: Sasha Agent; Veteran of the Year: Meredith Oden	Evan Anderson; Carey DePasquale; Sydney Durso; Brittany Evans; Mia Greenhouse; Stephanie Heymann; Whitney Isleib; Michelle Keys; Kaitlin LeGrand; Meagan McVay; Meredith Oden; Tobie Percival; Kelsi Reich; Meagan Sharp; Brooke Sorenson; Olivia Stevanovski; Ashton Torres; Cassie Trammell; Ally Traylor; Crystal Trevino; Trisha Trevino

=== 2009 season (Season 4) ===
2009–10 Squad

Returning Veterans	Rookies	Retired / Cut / Resigned	Roles / Awards	Show Group
Jordan Baum; Jordan Chanley; Sydney Durso; Brittany Evans; Kristen Gauthier; Sarah Gourley; Nicole Hamilton; Kaitlin Ilseng; Whitney Isleib (Note: Isleib dressed as Lil Wayne in blackface for a 2009 Halloween party. The scandal was "handled internally," and Isleib remained on Dallas Cowboys cheerleaders squad with no public consequences or punishment.); Melissa Kellerman; Michelle Keys; Abigail Klein; **Meredith Oden**; Tobie Percival; Justine Phillips-Orf; Amy Reese; Kelsi Reich; Meagan Sharp; Brooke Sorenson; **Cassie Trammell**; Ally Traylor; Crystal Trevino; Trisha Trevino; Tia Williams	Evan Anderson; Jacqueline Bob; Sunni Cranfill; Carey DePasquale; Brandi Kilby; Mia Greenhouse; Vanessa Jenkins; Joannah Liad; Meagan McVay; Malia Morales; Ashton Torres	Lauren Castillo (cut); Sarah Clay (retired); Deryn Derbigny (retired); Kandi Harris (retired); Julie Jacobs (retired); Erica Jenkins (retired); Jordyn Ketchum (retired); Dara McFarlane (retired); Jennifer McMahon (cut mid-season for breach of contract); Stefani Peterson (retired); Ryan Ray (retired); Makenzi Swicegood (retired)	Point: Nicole Hamilton; Pro Bowl 2010 Representative: Justine Phillips-Orf; Rookie of the Year: Malia Morales; Veteran of the Year: Nicole Hamilton	Evan Anderson; Brittany Evans; Nicole Hamilton; Whitney Isleib; Michelle Keys; Abigail Klein; Meagan McVay; Meredith Oden; Tobie Percival; Justine Phillips-Orf; Kelsi Reich; Meagan Sharp; Brooke Sorenson; Cassie Trammell; Ally Traylor; Crystal Trevino; Trisha Trevino

=== 2008 season (Season 3) ===
2008–09 Squad

Returning Veterans	Rookies	Retired / Cut / Resigned	Roles / Awards	Show Group
Sarah Clay; Deryn Derbigny; Kristen Gauthier; Sarah Gourley; Nicole Hamilton; Kandi Harris; Julie Jacobs; Erica Jenkins; Abigail Klein; Dara McFarlane; **Meredith Oden**; Tobie Percival; Justine Phillips-Orf; Ryan Ray; Meagan Sharp; Brooke Sorenson; Makenzi Swicegood; Ally Traylor; Trisha Trevino; Tia Williams	Jordan Baum; Lauren Castillo; Jordan Chanley; Sydney Durso; Brittany Evans; Kaitlin Ilseng; Whitney Isleib; Melissa Kellerman; Jordyn Ketchum; Michelle Keys; Jennifer McMahon; Stefani Peterson; Amy Reese; Kelsi Reich; **Cassie Trammell**; Crystal Trevino	Gina Becchetti (retired) (Note: After leaving DCC, Becchetti cheered for the Minnesota Vikings.); Carmen Butler (cut); Candice Carr (retired); Misty Duncan (retired); Megan Fox (retired); Loni Lindsey (retired); Michelle Mozek (cut); Leah Mullinax (cut); Christina Murphy (retired); Jennifer Nix (retired); Christina Parker (retired); Erica Perry (retired); Andrea Rogers (cut); Melissa Rycroft (retired) (Note: Rycroft later appeared on season 13 of The Bachelor and two seasons of Dancing with the Stars.); Sarah Shelton (retired); Emily "Starr" Spangler (retired) (Note: Spangler later appeared on and won season 13 of The Amazing Race with her brother, Nick.); Kelly Jo Stauffacher (cut); Natalie Woods (retired)	Point: Nicole Hamilton; Pro Bowl 2009 Representative: Nicole Hamilton; Rookie of the Year: Brittany Evans	Deryn Derbigny; Brittany Evans; Nicole Hamilton; Kandi Harris; Erica Jenkins; Abigail Klein; Dara McFarlane; Meredith Oden; Tobie Percival; Justine Phillips-Orf; Kelsi Reich; Meagan Sharp; Brooke Sorenson; Makenzi Swicegood; Ally Traylor; Crystal Trevino; Trisha Trevino

=== 2007 season (Season 2) ===
2007–08 Squad

Returning Veterans	Rookies	Retired / Cut / Resigned	Roles / Awards
Carmen Butler; Deryn Derbigny; Misty Duncan; Megan Fox; Sarah Gourley; Nicole Hamilton; Kandi Harris; Jennifer Nix; Christina Parker; Tobie Percival; Julie Jacobs; Leah Mullinax; Erica Perry; Justine Phillips; Andrea Rogers; Melissa Rycroft; Brooke Sorenson; Emily "Starr" Spangler; Makenzi Swicegood; Trisha Trevino	Gina Becchetti; Candice Carr; Sarah Clay; Kristen Gauthier; Erica Jenkins; Abigail Klein; Loni Lindsey; Dara McFarlane; Michelle Mozek; Christina Murphy; **Meredith Oden**; Ryan Ray; Meagan Sharp; Sarah Shelton; Kelly Jo Stauffacher; Ally Traylor; Tia Williams; Natalie Woods	Lynlee Allen (retired); Yoshiko Danjo (retired); Elizabeth Davis (retired); Emma Dawson (retired); Becca Gambel (retired); Kristin Hager (cut); Lisa Henslin (retired); Jen Hill (retired); Monica Moore (retired); Whitney Ott (retired); Andrea Richards (retired); Cori Robinson (cut); Dulce Rosales (retired); Carrie Stilwell (retired); Leah Wilkins (retired)	Pro Bowl 2008 Representative: Misty Duncan

=== 2006 season (Season 1) ===
2006–07 Squad

Returning Veterans	Rookies	Retired / Cut / Resigned	Roles / Awards
Lynlee Allen; Carmen Butler; Elizabeth Davis; Emma Dawson; Misty Duncan; Megan Fox; Becca Gambel; Sarah Gourley; Nicole Hamilton; Lisa Henslin; Jen Hill; Monica Moore; Whitney Ott; Christina Parker; Erica Perry; Justine Phillips; Andrea Richards; Cori Robinson; Emily "Starr" Spangler; Makenzi Swicegood; Trisha Trevino; Leah Wilkins	Yoshiko Danjo; Deryn Derbigny; Kristin Hager; Kandi Harris; Julie Jacobs; Leah Mullinax; Jennifer Nix; Tobie Percival; Andrea Rogers; Dulce Rosales; Melissa Rycroft; Brooke Sorenson; Carrie Stilwell	Tricia Adams (retired); Cheryl Andrews (retired); Misty Cleveland (retired); Monica Cravinas (retired); Candice Estfan (cut); Shenythia Frazier (retired); Deanna Hernandez (cut); Amberly Hix (retired); Jasmin Jones (retired); Chelsea Keifer (retired); Shatera Kennedy (retired); Irene Maddox (retired); Taylor Miller (retired); Tavia Morris (retired); Brandi Redmond (retired); Crystal Risher (retired); Melissa Rutigliano (cut)	Pro Bowl 2007 Representative: Megan Fox

=== 2005 season (Pilot) ===
2005–06 Squad

Returning Veterans	Rookies	Retired / Cut / Resigned	Roles / Awards
Trisha Adams; Lynlee Allen; Cheryl Andrews; Monica Cravinas; Elizabeth Davis; Emma Dawson; Misty Duncan; Candice Estfan; Misty Eubanks-Cleveland; Megan Fox; Shenythia Frazier; Becca Gambel; Lisa Henslin; Amberly Hix; Jasmin Jones; Irene Maddox; Monica Moore; Tavia Morris; Whitney Ott; Christina Parker; Brandi Redmond; Crystal Risher; Leah Wilkins	Carmen Butler; Sarah Gourley; Nicole Hamilton; Deanna Hernandez; Jen Hill; Chelsea Keifer; Shatera Kennedy; Taylor Miller; Justine Phillips; Andrea Richards; Cori Robinson; Melissa Rutigliano; Starr Spangler; Makenzie Swicegood; Trisha Trevino	Laura Beke (retired); Adrianna Butler (retired); Stefani Crabtree (retired); Jenni Croft (retired); Traci Curb (retired); Tina Garza (retired); Amber Gosdin (retired); Stefanie Jennings (retired); Micaela Johnson (retired); Misti Johnson (cut); Emily Kuchar (retired); Kari Laywell (cut); Candace Montez (retired); Erica Perry (cut); Liz Porter (retired); Chrystal Roberson (retired); Audrea Ulmer (retired); Sara White (retired)	Pro Bowl 2006 Representative: Lynlee Allen; Rookie of the Year: Nicole Hamilton

== Cheerleaders (by tenure) ==
Legend
Cut	
Retired	
Resigned	Resigned
Rookie	
Rookie of the Year	*
Veteran	
Veteran of the Year	*
Break	Break
Point	^
Group Leader	GL
2nd Group Leader	2GL
Pro Bowl Representative	

First Name	Last Name	2006	2007	2008	2009	2010	2011	2012	2013	2014	2015	2016	2017	2018	2019	2020	2021
KayDianna	Davis																
Ashlinn	Maze																
Megan	Mcelaney																
Jensen	Merrill																
Kelee	Norris																*
Kleine	Powell																
Madeline	Salter																
Tori	Skillings																
Rebecca	Troyak																
Lea	Tunnell																
Jessica	Bowman																
Elli	DiGiovanni																
Darian	Lassiter (Note: Daughter of the late NFL player Kwamie Lassiter)																
Armani	Latimer																
Dani	McGinnis																
Jada	McLean																
Mckenzie	Sherman															*	
Claire	Wolford																
Victoria	Kalina																Break
Chandi	McCright																
Kelcey	Wetterberg														*		
Marissa	Garrison																
Kat	Puryear																
Ashlee	Ford															2GL	2GL
Jalyn	Stough																2GL
Caroline	Sundvold													*		2GL	GL
Lisa	Mills																Break
Amber	Laiche																
Kristin	Dodd																
Taylor	Johnson																
Amber	McMillan															2GL	2GL
Madeline	Molloy																
Erin	Sauerhage																2GL
Rachel	Wyatt															2GL^	GL^*
Gina	Ligi														2GL	GL*	GL^
Lexie	Sullivan														2GL	GL	GL
Alora-Rose	Morgan																Resigned
Amanda	Dilks																Resigned
Sydney	Hawthorne																
Briana	Baisden																
Daphne	Janes																
Cianna	Levi																
Alanna	Tarango																
Rachel	Alexander																
Savannah	Heineken																
Tess	Guidry														GL	GL	
Maddie	Massingill													GL	GL^	GL^	
Lily	Johnson																
Meredith	Madden																
Hannah	Anderson																
Brennan	Cook																
Taylor	Pedersen																
Bridget	Jacob														*		
Molly	Neumeister																
Alexis	Peterson														2GL		
Christina	Riccelli																
Miranda	Tims														2GL		
Heather	O'Connor											*		*	GL		
Amy	Leonall													GL	GL^		
Gabby	Goduco																
Lauren	Parker																
Khalyn	Cole																
Tasha	Cruz																
Yuko	Kawata																
Jessika	Palmer																
Kelli	Sullivan																
KaShara	Garrett										*		GL^	GL^			
Lacey	Munoz												GL	GL			
Keyra	Ford																
Tara	Szybillo																
Selina	Flores																
Cersten	Bradley																
Kelsey	Lowrance																
Maggie	Rouse																
Simone	Culwell																
Chantel	Jones																
Stephanie	Larson																
Robin	Richardson												*				
Elizabeth	Voegtle																
Jinelle	Davidson												GL				
Jenna	Jackson											GL	GL^				
Milan	Brahney												Resigned				
Holly	Powell												Resigned				
Kalyssa	Singleton												Resigned				
Alexandria	Stavropoulos												Resigned				
Allie	Droste																
Heather	Hamilton																
Raylee	Stearman																
Mandy	Voecks																
Claire	Brown																
Megan	Carcioppolo																
Jaclyn	Tisdale																
Amy	Trader																
Melissa	Wallace																
Erica	Wilkins																
Jennifer	Amburn										GL	GL^					
Danielle	Barhold											GL					
Jessica	Purdy											GL*					
Paige	Cavalieri											Resigned					
Kat	Rogers																
Calia	Sims																
Victoria	Carriere																
Mary	Dill									*							
Loren	Roeder																
Ashley	Holland																
Rachel	Lunsford																
Kelsey	Bond																
Kinzie	Rusco																
Jacie	Scott										GL						
Holly	Hubbard						*			GL^	GL^*						
Angela	Nicotera										GL						
Breelan	Statham																
Ashley	Prochazka																
Jasmine	Goode (Note: Appeared on The Bachelor Season 21)																
Courtney	Russ																
Abby	Bertrand																
Samantha	Clark																
Jessica	Kalil																
Jennifer	Colvin																
Jordan	Daigle																
Ashley	Ferrel																
Emma	Dutton									GL							
Katy	Fink																
Veronica	Lind																
Brittney	Schram																
Nicole	Bulcher									GL*							
Sydney	Durso							GL	GL	GL							
Morgan	Jordan																
Courtni	Wedeman																
Hannah	West																
Alex	Hermes																
Kaitlyn	Phillips																
Carisa	McMillan																
Olivia	Sharber																
Kim	Tong																
Amelia	Smith																
Mackenzie	Weeks																
Lauren	Williams								GL*								
Jacqueline	Bob							GL*	GL								
Mia	Greenhouse								GL^								
Chelsea	Chaney																
Teri	George																
Collin	Sarvis																
Emily	Claire																
Kali	Drake																
Colleen	Brent																
Courtney	Cook																
Alexandra	Gandara																
Meagan	McVay																
Whitney	Isleib						GL^	GL^									
Melissa	Kellerman																
Cassie	Trammell						GL	GL									
Jenna	Brooks																
Cassie	Dyson																
Meghan	Phillips																
Kamilah	Todd																
Alyssa	Torres																
Amber	Smith																
Sasha	Agent																
Ann	Lux																
Sunni	Cranfill																
Ashton	Torres																
Brittany	Evans			*			GL*										
Kaitlin	Ilseng																
Kelsi	Reich																
Ally	Traylor					GL	GL										
Kaitlin	LeGrand																
Olivia	Stevanovski																
Stephanie	Heymann																
Alyssa	Sarasani																
Evan	Anderson																
Carey	DePasquale																
Joannah	Liad																
Jordan	Baum																
Jordan	Chanley																
Michelle	Keys																
Crystal	Trevino					^											
Meredith	Oden					GL*											
Meagan	Sharp																
Tia	Williams																
Tobie	Percival																
Brooke	Sorenson					GL											
Trisha	Trevino				GL	GL											
Amy	Reese																
Brandi	Kilby																
Vanessa	Jenkins																
Malia	Morales				*												
Kristen	Gauthier																
Abigail	Klein																
Sarah	Gourley			GL	GL												
Nicole	Hamilton			GL^	GL^*												
Justine	Phillips-Orf			GL	GL												
Lauren	Castillo																
Jennifer	McMahon																
Jordyn	Ketchum																
Stefani	Peterson																
Sarah	Clay																
Erica	Jenkins																
Dara	McFarlane																
Ryan	Ray																
Deryn	Derbigny																
Kandi	Harris																
Julie	Jacobs																
Makenzi	Swicegood			GL													
Michelle	Mozek																
Kelly Jo	Stauffacher																
Leah	Mullinax																
Andrea	Rogers																
Carmen	Butler																
Gina	Becchetti																
Candice	Carr																
Loni	Lindsey																
Christina	Murphy																
Sarah	Shelton																
Natalie	Woods																
Jennifer	Nix																
Melissa	Rycroft																
Misty	Duncan		GL														
Megan	Fox	GL	GL														
Christina	Parker		GL														
Erica	Perry																
Emily "Starr"	Spangler																
Kristin	Hager																
Cori	Robinson																
Yoshiko	Danjo																
Dulce	Rosales																
Carrie	Stilwell																
Lynlee	Allen	GL															
Elizabeth	Davis	GL															
Emma	Dawson																
Becca	Gambel																
Lisa	Henslin	GL															
Jen	Hill																
Monica	Moore																
Whitney	Ott																
Andrea	Richards																
Leah	Wilkins																
Deanna	Hernandez																
Melissa	Rutigliano																
