= Pioneers Rest (Fort Worth, Texas) =

Cemetery in Fort Worth, Texas, United States

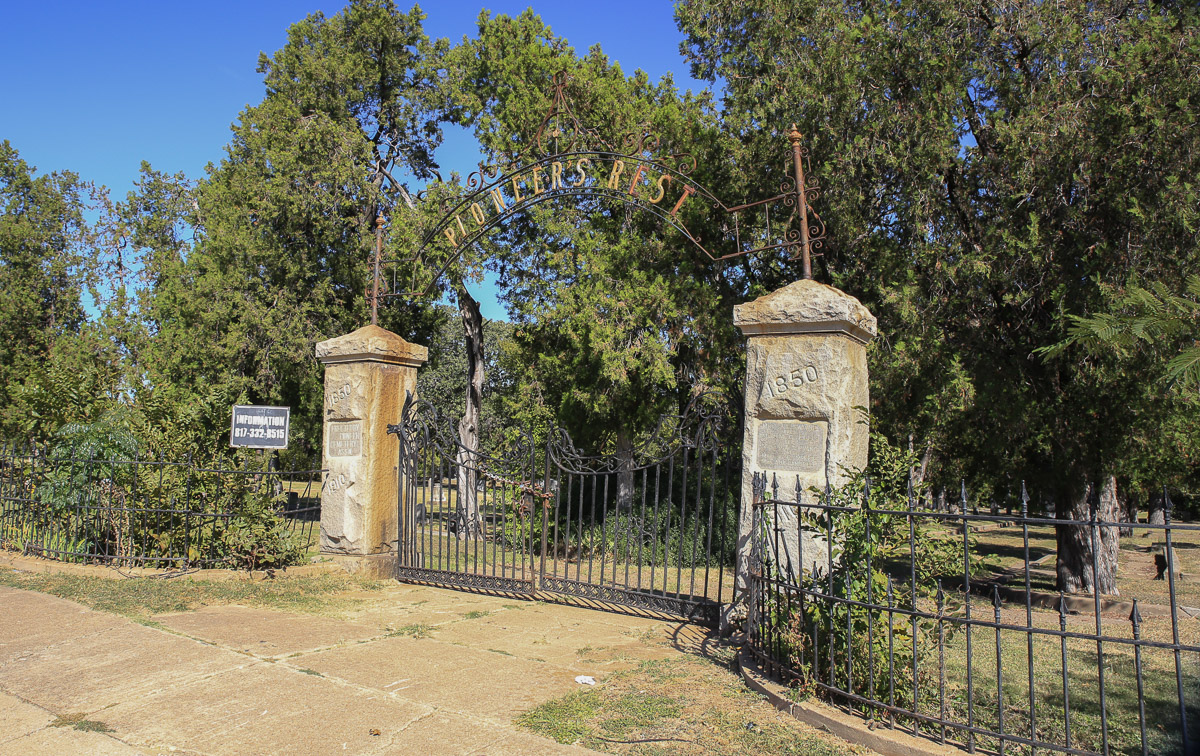
- Interactive map of Pioneers Rest

Details
- Established: 1850
- Location: Fort Worth, Texas
- Country: US
- Coordinates: 32°45′56″N 97°19′43″W
- Owned by: Pioneers Rest Cemetery Association
- Size: 6 acres (2.4 ha)
- Find a Grave: Pioneers Rest
- Pioneers Rest Cemetery
- U.S. National Register of Historic Places
- Location within Texas Location within the United States
- Location: 600 Samuels Ave., Fort Worth, Texas
- Built: 1849
- NRHP reference No.: 100006072
- Added to NRHP: January 27, 2021

Pioneers Rest is the oldest public cemetery in Fort Worth, Texas and one of the oldest in Tarrant County. Its use as a burial ground began in the summer of 1850, shortly after the fort was established by the United States Army.

Pioneers Rest is located in the 600 block of Samuels Avenue near its intersection with Cold Springs Road, immediately north of downtown Fort Worth. Many early settlers are buried at Pioneers Rest, which was referred to as the "old cemetery," "city cemetery," or "Samuels Avenue cemetery" until 1909. Veterans of every American war from the War of 1812 to World War II are buried at Pioneers Rest. The cemetery was listed on the National Register of Historic Places in 2021.

== History ==
Adolphe Gouhenant donated three acres of land on a bluff overlooking the Trinity River for a public cemetery, where the first burials were the eleven soldiers who died (most likely from cholera) in the months after the establishment of the fort. Sophie and Willie Arnold, the two young children of Major Ripley Allen Arnold, the officer responsible for establishment of the fort, both perished in 1850 and were buried at the cemetery. Major Arnold, considered to be the founder of the city of Fort Worth, was killed in a duel at Fort Graham in present-day Hill County, Texas in 1853. Originally buried at Fort Graham, the following year his body was moved and reinterred at what was then Fort Worth's only public cemetery.

A cemetery association was organized in 1870 to care for the site; its trustees included city leaders K. M. Van Zandt, M. B. Loyd, W. A. Darter, and W. P. Burts. By this time, the cemetery was nearly full and local leader John Peter Smith donated land to create Oakwood Cemetery, across the Trinity River from downtown Fort Worth. In 1871 an additional three acres was donated by Baldwin Samuels, after which Samuels Avenue is named, to expand the "old cemetery."

In 1909, the cemetery was formally named "Pioneers Rest" and the organization known as the Samuels Avenue Cemetery Association reformed as the Pioneers Rest Cemetery Association. Plans were made for a monument to honor Ripley Allen Arnold, and in 1911 a subscription fund for the monument was established under the condition that Arnold's body would be moved within the cemetery to a new Arnold Park. In 1917 it was discovered that the Pioneers Rest property, long considered a "no-man's land," was actually owned by the City of Fort Worth, which had purchased it in 1880 for $76. After proposing to convert the property into a city park, the park board ultimately elected to return the property to the Pioneers Rest Cemetery Association and provide free water for maintenance of the cemetery.

In 1928, the remains of Tarrant County namesake, Republic of Texas militia member and State Representative Edward H. Tarrant were moved to Pioneers Rest, having been interred for nearly seventy years at his family cemetery in Ellis County, and for one year at Fondren Cemetery in Parker County. A new monument honoring Tarrant was placed in 1931.

During the Great Depression, Pioneers Rest became a popular campsite for hobos because it was near the railroad, offered dense shrubs as cover, and the Tarrant County Courthouse lawn in downtown Fort Worth had already become overcrowded.

Inscriptions from all grave markers were recorded for Fort Worth's centennial in 1948, and updated in 1976. A Texas Historical Marker honoring Edward H. Tarrant was dedicated in 1987. All grave plots in Pioneers Rest had been sold by the 1920s, but the last burial did not take place until 1993. A marker for the first eleven soldiers buried at Pioneers Rest was placed in 1999 and a monument for Confederate Civil War veterans was dedicated in 2000.

Pioneers Rest continues to be maintained by the Pioneers Rest Cemetery Association and is open to the public on weekdays and weekends.

== Notable graves and monuments ==
Numerous original Peters Colony settlers, local civic figures, and Civil War veterans are buried at Pioneers Rest. Notable graves include:

- Ripley Allen Arnold (1817–1853) – Founder of Fort Worth and major in the United States Army
- James J. Byrne (1841–1880) – The youngest general in the Union Army during the Civil War
- Ephraim Merrill "Bud" Daggett (1850–1921) – Fort Worth cattleman and father of Mary Daggett Lake
- Ephraim Merrill "Eph" Daggett (1810–1883) – The "Father of Fort Worth" and participant in the Regulator-Moderator War
- Lemuel James Edwards (1805–1869) – Early Peters Colony settler and landowner in present-day southwest Fort Worth and Benbrook
- James Franklin Ellis (1838–1899) – Early Fort Worth settler and luxury hotel owner
- Merida Green Ellis (1847–1932) – One of the founders of the Fort Worth Stockyards
- Gustavus Adolphus Everts (1797–1884) – Judge and Fannin County representative at the Convention of 1845, which approved annexation and drafted a state constitution
- Abraham "Abe" Harris (1824–1915) – Mexican War veteran who helped build the original fort in 1849, Confederate officer, and president of the Texas Association of Mexican War Veterans
- Etta O. Price Newby (1862–1936) – Civic leader who donated the Newby Memorial Building to the Woman's Club of Fort Worth
- Carroll Marion Peak (1828–1885) – Fort Worth's first physician and founder of the First Christian Church
- Baldwin L. Samuel (1803–1879) – Early Fort Worth settler and donor of land for Pioneers Rest
- Anna Shelton (1861–1939) – First president of The Woman's Club of Fort Worth, Member of Mary Isham Keith Chapter, NSDAR
- May Hendricks Swayne (1856–1940) – Founder of the Woman's Wednesday Club, Regent of Mary Isham Keith Chapter, NSDAR and granddaughter of Gustavus Adolphus Everts
- Roger Tandy (1806–1898) – Peters Colony settler and rancher in present-day east Fort Worth
- Edward H. Tarrant (1796–1858) – U.S Army General and Texas State Representative after which Tarrant County is named
- Jesse Shelton Zane-Cetti (1844–1922) – Entrepreneur and one of the founders of the Texas Brewing Company in Hell's Half Acre
