= Hazel Vaughn Leigh =

American philanthropist and civic leader (1897–1995)

- Occupation: Philanthropist

Hazel Vaughn Leigh (July 27, 1897 – April 27, 1995) was a philanthropist and civic leader in Fort Worth, Texas. As founder and longtime director of the Fort Worth Boys Club, she devoted her life to improving the lives of boys in Fort Worth and Tarrant County. She was the first, and for many years, only female director of a boys' club in the United States. Leigh was inducted into the Texas Women's Hall of Fame in 1993.

== Early life ==
Hazel Elizabeth Vaughn was born July 27, 1897, in Fort Worth to Bessie Elizabeth DeCory and Sam Vaughn. Both parents' families were early Texas settlers. Her maternal great-grandfather had arrived in Tarrant County in 1845, and subsequent generations were raised on family land on Oak Grove Road, in present-day southeast Fort Worth. Hazel's mother was a graduate of Fort Worth's Polytechnic College; her father worked for Axtell Windmill Supply and was known for his sense of humor. Hazel and her older brother, Howard, grew up in a house at the corner of Lipscomb and Rosedale Streets in the area now known as the Near Southside; the family later moved to a home on Travis Avenue. She attended the DeZavala School, Alexander Hogg School, took piano lessons at Fort Worth University, and graduated from Fort Worth Central High School in 1915. She did not immediately attend college due to ill health.

== Career ==
Hazel was active in Fort Worth society. She was an active member of the Ich Ka Bibble Club, Yaki Ki Yi Club and Falcolm Hegbeth Social Club until the latter was dissolved after a fatal drunk driving crash resulting from spiked punch at a club party; the club was re-formed as the Junior League of Fort Worth. She attended dances and other social events at Camp Bowie during World War I, and worked at the camp filing personnel records after its closure in 1918. In 1920, Hazel voted in the first election open to women. The same year, she was hired to handle truancy at Daggett Elementary School; in 1923 she became assistant to the school's principal.

=== San Francisco ===
In 1925, Grover accepted a position at Marland Oil Company and the couple moved to San Francisco. Hazel took a job writing classified ads at the San Francisco Chronicle under an assumed name so that her husband—and his employer—would not find out about her work. Within six months she was promoted to manager of classified advertising and supervised a staff of 34. When Grover eventually found out how she was spending her days and Hazel's newspaper career came to an abrupt halt, she joined the Daughters of the Confederacy and took an interest in the Columbia Park Boys' Club in the Mission District.

=== Return to Fort Worth ===
The Leighs returned to Fort Worth in 1926 when Marland Oil opened a Fort Worth office. Hazel worked at the Fort Worth Press and was again active in Fort Worth society, becoming a member of the Fort Worth Woman's Club. Grover left the oil business for law enforcement, joining the Secret Service and eventually becoming deputy sheriff of Tarrant County and a deputy U.S. Marshal. In 1931, Hazel joined St. Andrews Episcopal Church, although raised a Baptist, and took a public speaking course at Texas Christian University.

=== Panther Boys' Club ===
Funded by members of the local Rotary Club, the Panther Boys' Club opened on 3rd Street in downtown Fort Worth in 1926, becoming the second-oldest boys' club in Texas. In 1927 Fort Worth society women formed the Panther Boys' Club Women's Council to support the club. Hazel's mother became president of the women's auxiliary in 1930, and Hazel accepted the role of vice-president in 1933. Only a month later, Hazel assumed the presidency, and by 1934 had tripled membership in the group.

In 1934, the Panther Boys' Club hired a new executive director, causing a rift between the boys' club administration and the women's auxiliary. A group from the women's auxiliary, led by Hazel Vaughn Leigh, broke away from the Panther Boys' Club and formed the Fort Worth Boys Club in 1935.

=== Fort Worth Boys Club ===
The new Fort Worth Boys Club was established in Fort Worth's Northside with funding from the Kiwanis Club of North Fort Worth. Northside was chosen because it was the most populous part of the city with the "greatest delinquency" among children and teens. The new club opened at Boulevard Methodist Church on February 1, 1935, available to boys ages 6–14. 205 boys enrolled on opening day; enrollment had more than tripled by October of the same year. The club opened a new building at 100 Northwest 28th Street in 1937.

The club offered free medical care, eyeglasses, and clothing; after-school snacks were provided when boys began fainting from hunger. In addition to such necessities, boys attended free movies at the New Isis Theatre, received music lessons, and were given lectures on first aid, good citizenship, and the Bible. Boys were taken on hikes by students from Texas Christian University and led in other activities by Works Progress Administration and National Youth Administration workers between the ages of 16 and 25. Under Hazel's leadership, the women operating Fort Worth Boys Club held parties and bridge tournaments as fundraisers and worked tirelessly to secure financial backing for the club throughout the remainder of the Great Depression. The club's needs increased rapidly during World War II as many more families had working parents due to war industries and tours of duty. Special training was also provided for older boys preparing to enter the armed services.

In 1957, Hazel was awarded the Boys Club of America's Bronze Keystone Award for her work with the Fort Worth Boys Club. In 1959, she was appointed by governor Price Daniel to represent Texas at the White House Conference on Children and Youth and to serve a ten-year term on the State Committee for the Study of Juvenile Delinquency. In 1960, she was awarded the Boys' Club Professional Association's Golden Boy Award at the Waldorf Astoria Hotel in New York. She led the expansion of the Fort Worth Boys Club to include a recreation center at Eagle Mountain Lake in the 1970s and retired as the club's director in 1973, having grown membership to over 3500 boys. She continued to serve on the organization's board until 1985 when the core group of women leading the club lost an internal power struggle. The new leadership of the Fort Worth Boys Club honored Hazel with a Lifetime of Philanthropy award in 1987; in 1990, the club merged with the Panther Boys' Club to become the Boys & Girls Club of Greater Fort Worth. Among its notable alumni are professional football player and Texas House representative Yale Lary, pastor John Osteen, and Olympic shot putter Darrow Hooper.

== Other associations and honors ==
Hazel was a charter member of the American Legion Auxiliary. She and her mother were both active in the Democratic Party. She was invited to attend a dinner honoring John F. Kennedy in Austin on November 22, 1963, but he was assassinated in Dallas earlier that day. She also attended the inauguration of Texas governor Dolph Briscoe in 1975.

Hazel was one of the first 150 boys' club directors to be certified as Professional Workers of Boys Clubs, and a charter member of the National Association of Social Workers. She represented the American Association of University Women on the Presidential Commission on the Status of Women in 1960. In 1979, she was the recipient of the American Association of University Women's Hercules Award and the Boys' Clubs Professional Association Gold Award. Hazel was a member of the Texas Social Welfare Association, Girls Protective Association, and Tarrant County Historical Society.

Hazel was the president of the '93 Club, active in The Woman's Club of Fort Worth, the honorary vice president of the TCU Frog Club, an honorary Tarrant County deputy sheriff, and an honorary member of the Theta Epsilon sorority. She served on the Fort Worth Public Library board of trustees and citizen advisory board from 1973 to 1979 and was the recipient of the North Fort Worth Historical Society's Tad Lucas Life Achievement Award in 1993. In 1993, Hazel was also nominated to the Texas Women's Hall of Fame.

== Personal life ==
In 1923, Hazel Vaughn married Grover Cleveland Leigh (1888–1943), whom she had met through her brother. Grover, an Illinois native, had moved to Fort Worth as an employee of Empire Gas and Fuel. He was then relocated to Bartlesville, Oklahoma, where the couple was wed and lived for two years. These were the first years that Hazel, raised in a wealthy family, had lived without servants. In the 1930s, Hazel and Grover's relationship became strained as he developed a problem with alcohol. The couple, who suffered a deeply unhappy marriage, lived with Hazel's parents for several years even though Grover had a successful career. They never had any children and Grover died from head injuries caused by an accident at the Texas & Pacific Railway yards in 1943; he is buried at Shannon Rose Hill Cemetery in east Fort Worth. In the 1980s, a "billionaire friend" from Hazel's Bartlesfield, Oklahoma days proposed marriage, but she declined.

Hazel Vaughn Leigh died on April 27, 1995. She is buried at Fort Worth's Greenwood Cemetery.
