= Anna Shelton =

American businesswoman

- Anna Shelton in the 1920s
- Born: August 20, 1861; Fort Worth, Texas, CS
- Died: August 28, 1939 (aged 78); Fort Worth, Texas, US
- Monuments: Anna Shelton Hall at The Woman's Club of Fort Worth
- Education: Bethel College (Kentucky)
- Occupations: Real estate developer and homebuilder
- Organizations: The Woman's Club of Fort Worth; Texas Federation of Women's Clubs; General Federation of Women's Clubs; '93 Club; Sorosis Club; Mary Isham Keith Chapter DAR; Fort Worth Park League
- Political party: Democrat

Anna Shelton (August 20, 1861 – August 28, 1939) was an American businesswoman who founded several women's clubs in Fort Worth, Texas, most notably The Woman's Club of Fort Worth. She was active in Fort Worth's park league, the Fort Worth Library Association, Mary Isham Keith Chapter DAR, and the Fort Worth Art Association. Shelton became one of Fort Worth's first female real estate developers and homebuilders.

== Early life ==
Anna Shelton, born at the family home north of Fort Worth on August 20, 1861, was the youngest of four children born to Dr. John Foster Shelton, Jr. (1826–1891) and Martha Moore Bronaugh Shelton (1831–1874). Dr. John Shelton was a physician in Tarrant County prior to serving as a surgeon in the Confederate army, leaving his wife to care for the children and homestead. After the Civil War, the Sheltons moved into the city for the children to attend school; Dr. Shelton opened a drugstore on Weatherford Street in downtown Fort Worth. After the death of her mother, Dr. Shelton sent Anna back to Hopkinsville to attend Bethel Women's College, the girls' academy her mother had also attended. Anna returned to Fort Worth to care for her widower father in 1890, and moved in with her sister's family after her father's death the following year.

== Career ==
A bigamy scandal involving her sister's husband (and Fort Worth mayor), W.S. Pendleton, drove Anna Shelton to eschew traditional women's roles and "fashion herself into the civic-minded, informed, 'new woman.' Recognizing that she, as a single woman, had the advantage of sole ownership and control of her property, she mastered real estate law and banking practices and started buying and selling real estate for profit in the late 1890s." Shelton also tutored in English at Fort Worth University, which had been established by the Methodist Episcopal Church on the city's south side in 1881. Deciding she did not want to pursue a teaching career, in 1902 she left her position to study French and Spanish literature in Paris and New York for six months. She ultimately became one of Fort Worth's first female real estate developers and homebuilders, a successful venture that gave her a reputation as a shrewd businesswoman. Among other projects, Shelton was responsible for building a number of homes in the Fairmount neighborhood in Fort Worth's Near Southside.

== Women's clubs ==
Shelton was a member of the '93 Club and a charter member of the Sorosis Club, two early Fort Worth women's clubs. The '93 Club, named after the year it was formed, focused on literature and art appreciation. Its motto was "Knowledge Is Power." In 1903, Shelton was a founder of the Sorosis Club, whose name came from the Latin term for sisters. As an officer in both clubs, a delegate to start and national conventions of women's clubs, the state director on the board of the General Federation of Women's Clubs, and officer in the Texas Federation of Women's Clubs, she recognized the need to bring together Fort Worth's many woman's clubs into one umbrella organization with a shared physical space. In 1923, she organized a meeting of leaders from eleven local women's clubs to form a new "parent" organization, The Woman's Club of Fort Worth. The eleven charter clubs included her own '93 Club and Sorosis Club, as well as the Fort Worth Federation of Women's Clubs, Woman's Wednesday Club, Monday Book Club, Shakespeare Club, Penelope Club, Euterpean Club, History Club, College Women's Club, and Harmony Club.

As the founder of The Woman's Club of Fort Worth, she was also named by the club's charter as the first president of its board of directors. The club benefited tremendously from her professional relationships and reputation as a successful businesswoman. With her influence, the club was able to secure bank loans and finance services. Prominent local woman Etta O. Newby even donated the mansion that became the club's first headquarters based on Shelton's business acumen. Under Shelton's leadership, the club expanded its campus, acquiring more property and additional buildings; Anna Shelton Hall is named in her honor. During the Great Depression, the club assumed control of the Fort Worth Symphony Orchestra; Shelton was one of two members of The Woman's Club to serve as the symphony's director. In response to criticism of her plans for The Woman's Club of Fort Worth, she is quoted as saying, "No one has the right to tell me what I cannot do."

Suffering from chronic illness, Shelton retired from the presidency of The Woman's Club in June 1939, having served sixteen years in the position. Shelton has been eulogized as "the personality that animated and combined all the facets of Club activities...With her death in 1939, an era of the Club which can never be recaptured passed from the community."

== Civic involvement ==
During the first decade of the twentieth century, Shelton was active with the city's Park League, serving on its Arbor Day and school gardening competition committees. Shelton was also active in Progressive Era politics, having been selected to represent Tarrant County at the 1920 state Democratic convention in support of Pat Morris Neff's gubernatorial campaign and the party's women's suffrage platform.

Shelton was on the board of the Fort Worth Library Association and the Fort Worth Art Association, which organized the city's first public library and art museum, though she was often at odds with library director and fellow clubwoman and suffragist Jennie Scott Scheuber. In 1922, she was among the trustees of the Fort Worth Library Association who petitioned for an amendment to the city charter in an attempt to maintain the Association's control of the library and protect it from municipal government politics.

== Death ==
Shelton died at Cook Memorial Hospital on August 28, 1939, having suffered from arteriosclerosis for a number of years and enduring a ten-month hospital stay in 1937. Her simple funeral service, led by Reverend Albert Venting of Cleburne, was held at The Woman's Club of Fort Worth's Anna Shelton Hall. She was buried alongside her parents in the Shelton family plot at Pioneers Rest cemetery.
