= Walter Pope (disambiguation) =

Walter Pope (c. 1627–1714) was an English astronomer. Walter Pope may also refer to:

- Walter Lyndon Pope (1889–1969), United States federal judge
- Walter Elmer Pope (1897–1844), Texas state legislator

== See also ==
- Walter Poppe (disambiguation)
- Walter James Macqueen-Pope (1888–1960), English theatre historian and publicist
