= The Woman's Club of Fort Worth =

- U.S. National Register of Historic Places
- Recorded Texas Historic Landmark
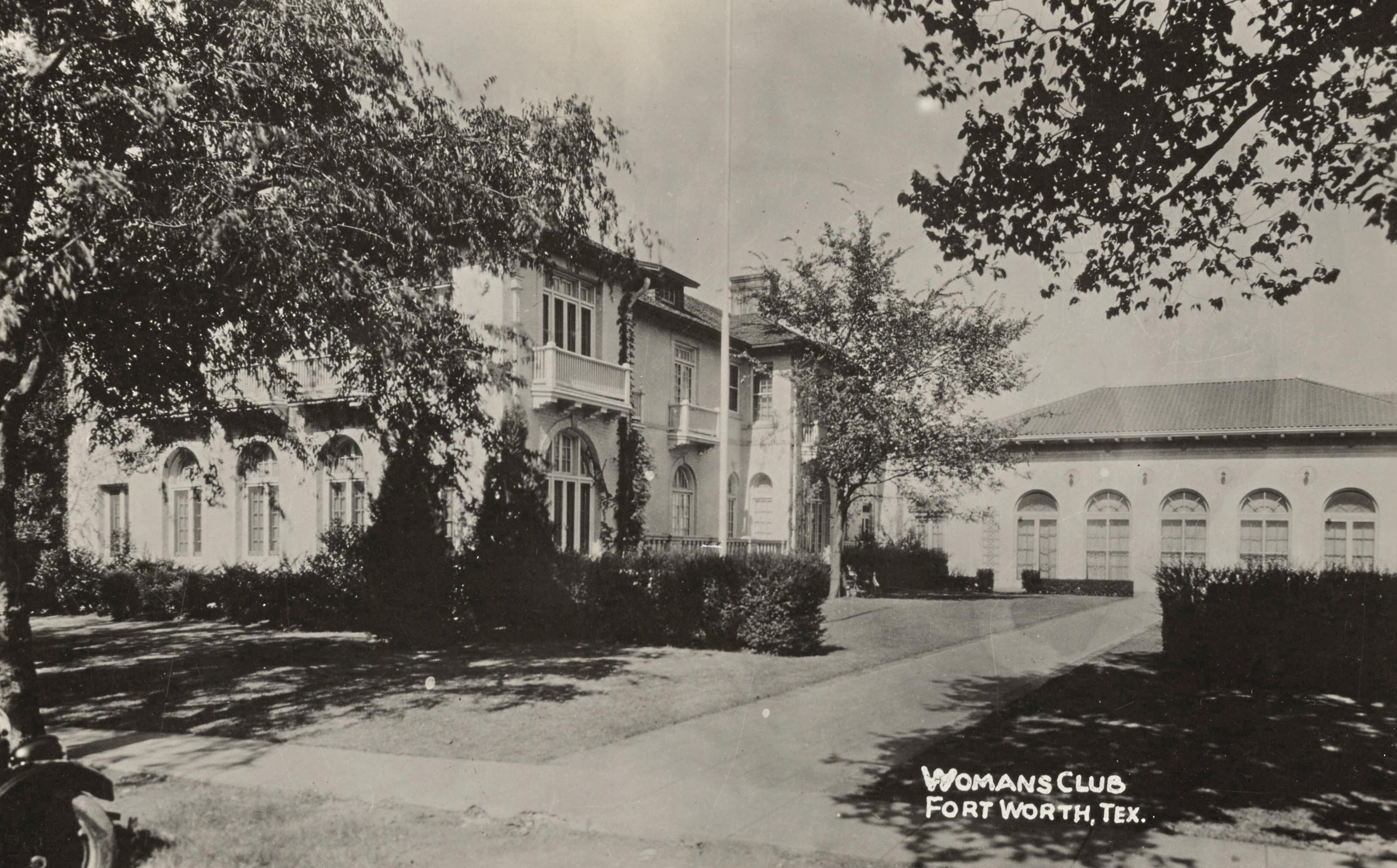
- The Woman's Club in 1926

- Location within Texas Location within the United States
- Location: 1316 Pennsylvania Ave. Fort Worth, TX
- Coordinates: 32°26′31″N 97°12′09″W
- Area: 2.2 acres (0.89 ha)
- Built: 1910–1926
- Organizer: Anna Shelton
- Architectural style: Queen Anne, Colonial Revival, Italian Renaissance Revival, Craftsman
- Website: Official website
- NRHP reference No.: 100000862

Significant dates
- Established: January 1923
- Added to NRHP: 10 April 2017
- Designated RTHL: 1976

William G. Newby Memorial Building.

Anna Shelton Hall.

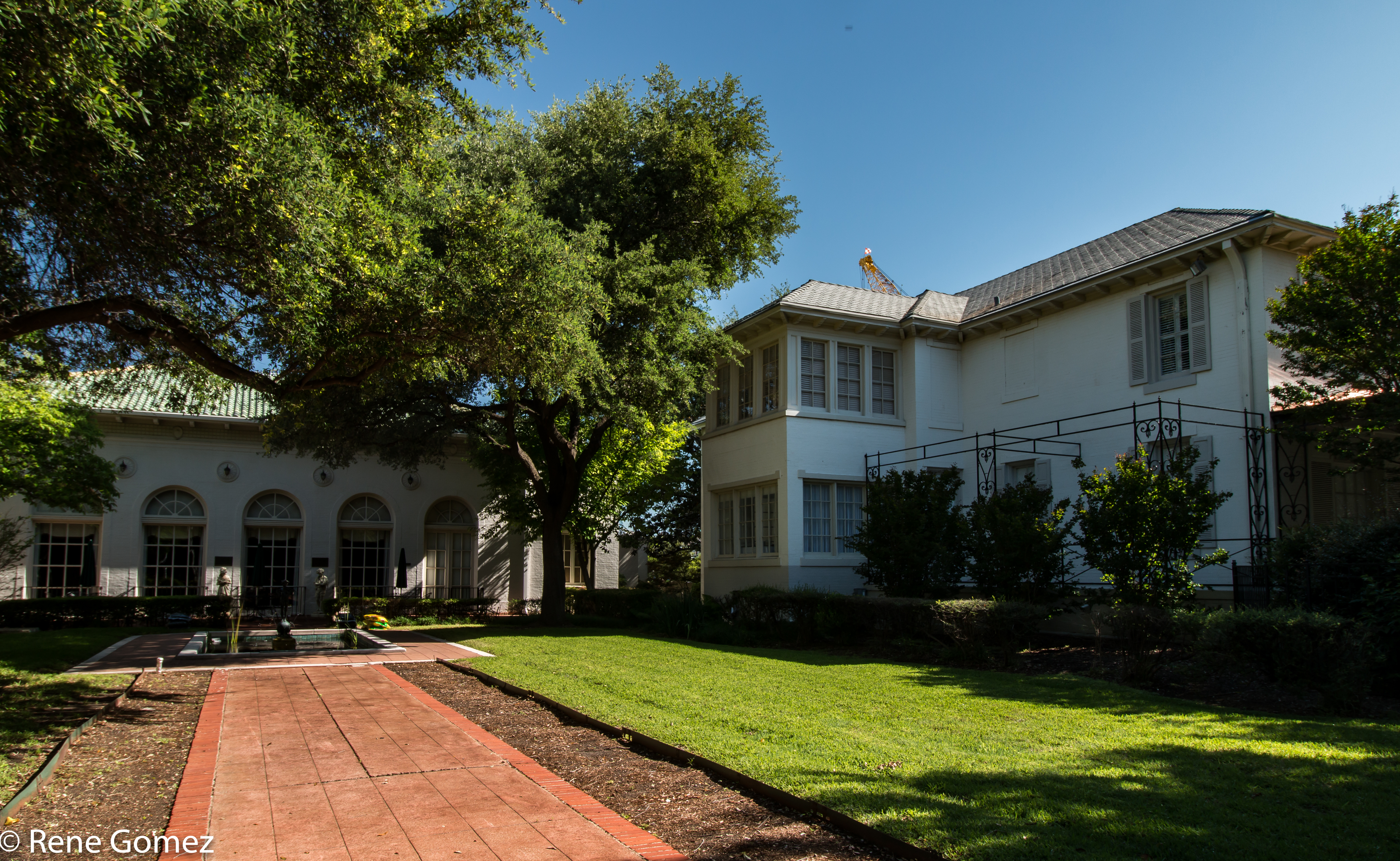
The Woman's Club in 2017.

The Woman's Club of Fort Worth is one of the city's oldest membership organizations, formed in 1923 by the members of several existing woman's clubs. The Woman's Club complex comprises eight historic buildings on Fort Worth's Near Southside and was listed on the National Register of Historic Places in 2017. As with many woman's clubs in the United States, the Woman's Club of Fort Worth has its roots in the Progressive Movement, with its original mission of "the cultural and civic advancement of Fort Worth; and the study of literature, history, science, painting, music, and other fine arts."

== History ==
Local businesswoman Anna Shelton (1861-1939) recognized the need to bring together Fort Worth's many disparate woman's clubs into one umbrella organization with a shared physical space. Representatives of eleven local woman's clubs met at the First Christian Church in January 1923 to form the new organization; the eleven charter clubs included the Fort Worth Federation of Women's Clubs, the Woman's Wednesday Club, the Monday Book Club, '93 Club, Sorosis Club, Shakespeare Club, Penelope Club, Euterpean Club (named after the Greek muse, Euterpe), History Club, College Women's Club, and the Harmony Club. Both the Fort Worth Federation of Women's Clubs and Sorosis Clubs were established members of the Texas Federation of Women's Clubs. The Fort Worth Garden Club was organized in 1926 under the auspices of The Woman's Club but did not become a formal member.

A member of the '93 Club, Sorosis Club, and state representative at national women's club conventions, Anna Shelton became the club's first president in 1923, a position she held until shortly before her death in 1939. The same year, Etta O. Newby, a Fort Worth woman who was not a member of any woman's clubs, donated a residence on Pennsylvania Avenue in Fort Worth's Quality Hill neighborhood to the organization in memory of her late husband. The mansion was then occupied by military personnel as the United States Office of Alien Property Custodian had assumed ownership of the property when its German owners were stranded in Europe during World War I. The deed of gift transferring ownership of the building, to be named the William G. Newby Memorial Building, to the Woman's Club limited its use to white women engaging in educational and cultural activities; the deed also forbade drinking, smoking, and gambling on the premises. Perhaps remarkably, Newby's smoking ban was the only controversial term of the gift at the time, as factions of club leaders faced off, with Anna Shelton supporting the ban and library director Jennie Scott Scheuber "championing the cause of women's right to smoke."

In 1931, the Woman's Club of Fort Worth became the first in Texas with its own radio show on KFJZ, which was owned by Margaret Meacham, a prominent club member. The same year, the club assumed management of the Fort Worth Symphony Orchestra, holding concerts in the Central High School auditorium; operations were handed back to the symphony's board in 1938. In 1932, the club started its Texas Library, which today holds a respected collection of rare books and Texana. The Texas Federation of Women's Clubs also used the Newby building as their headquarters until their own building was completed in Austin in 1933. The Woman's Club played an active role in the 1936 Frontier Centennial, Fort Worth's celebration of the Texas centennial, operating a Texas history speakers bureau and a small history museum on the event grounds. They also organized a Texas Centennial scrapbook project and a program to place Texas history books in local school libraries. Notable speakers at the club during the 1930s through 1950s include Gertrude Stein, Ogden Nash, Grant Wood, John Erskine, Robert St. John, and Alan Mowbray.

During this period, the club supported many local children's and medical charities, Red Cross, Fort Worth Public Library, and provided free music and art lessons to children. In 1970, the club's original charter was updated to comply with tax laws for non-profit organizations; this included the removal of the clause limiting membership to white women and creation of plans for distribution of assets in the event of the organization's dissolution. In 1993, the club established a historic preservation trust to care for the buildings and grounds.

== Buildings and grounds ==
The Woman's Club of Fort Worth occupies a 2.2-acre (0.89 ha) site on Pennsylvania Avenue in Fort Worth's Near Southside, and includes structures in the Queen Anne, Colonial Revival, Italian Renaissance Revival, and Craftsman styles. All structures in the complex are painted "antique Spanish white" to unify the disparate architectural styles. Four former residences built between 1903 and 1911, all originally part of the Quality Hill neighborhood, comprise the main buildings. Notable structures include:

- William G. Newby Memorial Building, a Quality Hill residence built around 1910. Donated to the organization in 1923, it is the club's first permanent home.
- Florence Shulman Hall, built before 1910 and purchased by the club in 1924.
- Anna Shelton Hall, built in 1925-26 by Fort Worth architects Sanguinet, Staats, and Hedrick, and named in honor of the club's first president.
- Ida Saunders Hall, built in 1903, purchased by the club in 1929, and designated a Recorded Texas Historic Landmark in 1966.
- Margaret Meacham Hall, a Quality Hill residence built around 1904, was converted for use as a nursing school in the 1920s and a funeral home from 1929 to 1954. Incorporating Queen Anne, Mission Revival, and Prairie School elements, it was acquired by The Woman's Club with the assistance of the Amon G. Carter Foundation in 1954 and designated a Recorded Texas Historic Landmark in 1967.

The landscape architecture firm of Hare & Hare, which the Fort Worth park board secured to develop the city parks master plan, designed the club's grounds in 1926 as a gift to the Fort Worth Garden Club.

In 1976, a Texas Historical Marker was placed in the courtyard outside Ida Saunders Hall. The Woman's Club received the Tarrant County Historic Preservation Council's Pinnacle Award in 1989. In 1990, the club's complex was designated as a City of Fort Worth Landmark, received a Fort Worth Beautiful Award, and was rezoned as a Cultural and Historic District. On May 3, 2012, the prestigious DAR Historic Preservation Award was presented to The Woman's Club of Fort Worth by Mary Isham Keith Chapter NSDAR of Fort Worth.

== Collections ==
The Woman's Club has a notable collection of furnishings and art, including nine grand pianos; the Jarvis Light, a chandelier once owned by Anna Jarvis, the founder of Mother's Day; portraits of prominent members by painter Emily Guthrie Smith, and Pipes of Pan, a bronze sculpture by Frederick MacMonnies.

== Notable members ==
- Mary Daggett Lake, historian and botanist who started the club's noted Texana library
- Hazel Vaughn Leigh, boys' club leader and president of the '93 Club in 1975-76
- Blanche McVeigh, renowned printmaker and chair of the Art Department in 1936-39
- Jennie Scott Scheuber, director of the Carnegie Library of Fort Worth and charter member of the Fort Worth Federation of Women's Clubs
- Anna Shelton, founder and longtime president of The Woman's Club of Fort Worth

== Participating clubs ==
As of 1998, the following clubs were active members of The Woman's Club of Fort Worth.

- Woman's Wednesday Club (1889)
- '93 Club (1893)
- Euterpean Club (1896)
- Monday Book Club (1896)
- Fort Worth Federation of Women's Clubs (1898)
- Penelope Club (1901)
- Harmony Club (1902)
- History Club (1902)
- Sorosis Club (1903)
- Woman's Shakespeare Club (1905)
- Cadmean Club (1908)
- Tarrant County Medical Society Auxiliary (1920)
- American Association of University Women, Fort Worth Chapter (1923)
- Junior Woman's Club (1926)
- Thursday Study Club (1928)
- Rose Lisenby Shakespeare Club (1934)
- Etta Newby Club (1939)
- Club Fidelite (1944)
- Nautilus Club (1946)
- E. Clyde Whitlock Music Club (1947)
- Friday Lecture Club (1947)
- Provarsu Study Club (1947)
- Beaux Arts Club (1953)
- Fort Worth Dental Society Auxiliary (1953)
- Creative Arts Study Club (1958)
- Sixty-Two Club (1962)
- Club Bon Soir (1966)
- Aquarius '70 (1969)
- Arts & Crafts Study Club (1972)
- Spectrum Club (1973)
- Galaxy Club (1974)
- La Maison (1975)
- Venture Club (1976)
- Round Table (formed 1925; joined The Woman's Club in 1991-1992)
- Deja Vu (1995)
- Renaissance Club (1995)
- Exposé (1997)
