= Texas, Our Texas =

Regional anthem of the U.S. state of Texas

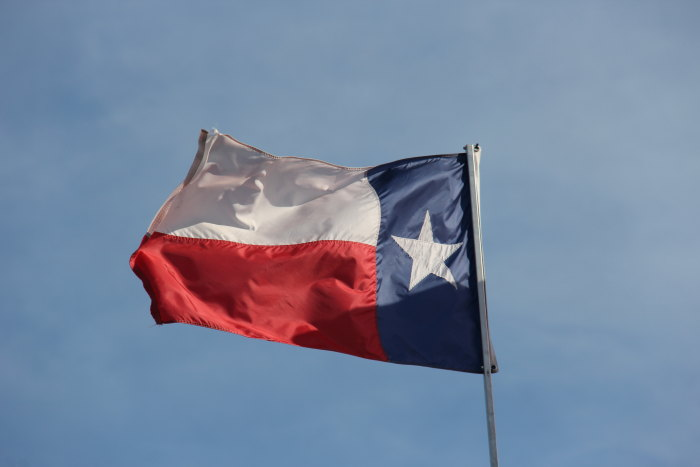
- Regional anthem of Texas
- Lyrics: Gladys Yoakum Wright, William J. Marsh, 1924
- Music: William J. Marsh, 1924
- Adopted: 1929; 97 years ago
- Readopted: 1993

Audio sample
- Digital performance: file; help

"Texas, Our Texas" is the regional anthem of the U.S. state of Texas, adopted in 1929 as the official state song.

== History ==
"Texas, Our Texas" was written in 1924 by William J. Marsh, who was born in Liverpool, United Kingdom, and emigrated to Texas as a young man, and Gladys Yoakum Wright (1891–1956), of Fort Worth, Texas. The anthem was selected as the official state song by a concurrent resolution of the Texas Legislature in 1929, following a statewide competition. Older songs, such as "The Yellow Rose of Texas" and "Dixie", were also considered but ultimately, the Legislature decided a new song should be composed.

Although the song has been sung since the 41st legislature in 1929, it was officially adopted by the 73rd legislature as the state song in 1993.

The song is usually performed just after the national anthem with a display of the flag. In the absence of the flag, those present during the song's performance are expected to face toward the music and act just as they would if the flag had been present.

The first word of the third line was originally largest, but when Alaska became the largest U.S. state when it was admitted to the United States in 1959, the word was replaced with boldest.

This song was sung in group by elementary students in Texas at the beginning of their school classes during the 1950s. As late as the 1990s, this song was still sung before classes in some schools, along with the pledge to the U.S. and Texan flags.

== Lyrics ==
I
Texas, our Texas! All hail the mighty State!
Texas, our Texas! So wonderful so great!
Boldest and grandest, Withstanding ev'ry test;
O Empire wide and glorious, You stand supremely blest.

Chorus:
𝄆 God bless you Texas! And keep you brave and strong,
That you may grow in power and worth,
Thro'out the ages long. 𝄇 (Note: May not be repeated)

II
Texas, O Texas! Your freeborn single star,
Sends out its radiance to nations near and far.
Emblem of freedom! It sets our hearts aglow,
With thoughts of San Jacinto and glorious Alamo.

Chorus

III
Texas, dear Texas! From tyrant grip now free,
Shines forth in splendor your star of destiny!
Mother of heroes! We come your children true,
Proclaiming our allegiance, our faith, our love for you.

Chorus
