= William J. Marsh =

William John Marsh
- William John Marsh in the 1920s.
- Born: June 24, 1880; Liverpool, England
- Died: February 1, 1971 (aged 90); Fort Worth, Texas
- Burial place: Greenwood Memorial Park (Fort Worth)
- Education: Ampleforth College
- Occupations: composer; organist; choir director; educator
- Notable work: "Texas, Our Texas," the state song of Texas

William John Marsh (June 24, 1880 – February 1, 1971) was an American composer, organist, choir director, and educator most notable for composing "Texas, Our Texas," the official state song for the U.S. state of Texas. He was a longtime figure in the Dallas–Fort Worth arts community, working as a composer, choir director, music professor, and music critic. He published over 100 original compositions, including the official mass of the Texas Centennial and The Flower Fair at Peking, the first opera written and produced in the state of Texas.

== Early life and career ==
William John Marsh was born on June 24, 1880, one of six children born to James and Mary Cecilia McCormick Marsh in Woolton, a suburb of Liverpool, England. In the 1870s, Liverpool native James Marsh had worked for the Texas and Pacific Railway in Dallas, where he met Mary Cecilia McCormick, originally from Kentucky. James and Mary both met at Sacred Heart Cathedral, where they enjoyed singing. They married in 1877 and returned to Liverpool shortly afterward; James ultimately became the mayor of Woolton.

Young "Bill" Marsh showed an early interest in music, studying harmony, composition, and organ at Ampleforth College in Yorkshire beginning at age twelve. As a teen, he took his mother's place as the church organist at St. Mary's Catholic Church in Woolton. At age sixteen, he had the opportunity to take lessons with Robert Hope-Jones on his famous electric organ at St. John's Church in nearby Birkenhead.

Planning to only stay a year, Marsh moved to Fort Worth, Texas in September 1904 to work at his cousin Morris Berney's cotton business (which eventually became the well-known Neil P. Anderson firm). He planned his cross-country trip across the United States to allow a visit to the Louisiana Purchase Exposition in St. Louis.

By 1906, Marsh had left the cotton business and was working as the organist at First Presbyterian Church of Fort Worth, a position he held for 36 years. In 1908, he also became the organist at Temple Beth-El synagogue (a position he held for 23 years), the choral director of the Euterpean Club, choral director of the Harmony Club, and director of the Music Study Club chorus. In 1920, he also took on the role of choirmaster at his own church, St. Patrick's Cathedral, in downtown Fort Worth. From 1933 to 1941, Marsh was the director of the Swift Choral Club, a choir formed by employees of the Swift & Company meat packing plant in the Fort Worth Stockyards. He was also the music critic for the Fort Worth Star-Telegram for twenty years.

From 1934 to 1949, Marsh was the director of choral activities at Texas Christian University, where he was affectionately known as "Uncle Billy." He led the men's glee club on a New York tour in 1939 that included a performance at St. Patrick's Cathedral in midtown Manhattan. He began teaching at Our Lady of Victory Academy on Fort Worth's Southside the same year.

In the 1950s, Marsh directed the chorus of the William J. Marsh Music Club and the Marsh Young Artist String Ensemble, which were both members of the Texas Federation of Music Clubs.

== Compositions ==
During his career, Marsh composed over 100 original musical works, mostly religious in nature. He is best known for the following compositions:

- "Sunset" (1913) – Marsh's first published composition, for women's chorus and violin, written for Fort Worth's Harmony Club.
- "O! Night Divine!" (1917) – The highest-selling Christmas song of 1917.
- "Texas, Our Texas" (1924) – Marsh composed the music for the state song of Texas based on an older march he had written for Camp Bowie called "Your Flag and My Flag" (1918). The lyrics were written by one of Marsh's friends from church, Fort Worth native Gladys Yoakum (1891–1956). The song, though it remains controversial, is used at inaugurations, all official appearances of the Texas governor, state legislative sessions, holidays commemorating state events, Texas school and university graduation ceremonies, and any other occasions where the state is officially recognized. "Texas, Our Texas" was selected as the state song by multiple appointed committees, but struggled for years to be adopted by the state legislature even though co-writer Gladys Yoakum was herself the stepdaughter of a Texas state legislator. John Philip Sousa called "Texas, Our Texas" his favorite state song; though it has been described as "churchlike" and "insipid and forgettable," and attempts to change the state song have been made since the 1930s.
- The Flower Fair at Peking (1931) – The first opera written and produced in the state of Texas, it premiered at the 1931 Texas Federation of Music Clubs convention in Temple, Texas, under the direction of Samuel S. Losh.
- Choral Mass in Honor of the Infant Jesus (1935) – The most popular mass in the United States in 1935, selling over 40,000 copies.
- Texas Centennial Mass (1936) – The official mass of the Texas Centennial in Dallas, the piece was performed at a service with 30 bishops officiating and 2800 singers performing under Marsh's direction.

== Personal life ==
Marsh was a lifelong Catholic and became a United States citizen in 1917. He was a charter member of the Texas Federation of Music Clubs, which formed in 1915. He was the chair of the Texas Composers Guild for 25 years and a lifetime member of the Texas Federation of Music Clubs, National Federation of Music Clubs, Texas Music Teachers Association, and American Guild of Organists. In 1959, he was named the Outstanding Senior Citizen of Fort Worth. In 1970, the Euterpean Club and the mayor of Fort Worth proclaimed a "William J. Marsh Day" in honor of the 40th anniversary of the adoption of "Texas, Our Texas" as the state song.

Marsh's parents, James and Mary, spent their later years in Fort Worth with William and his sisters Clara, Mae, and Leoni, who operated the Marsh Private School for Young Children. The family lived in a west Fort Worth home on the site of the present-day campus of the University of North Texas Health Science Center. Marsh died February 1, 1971, at St. Joseph's Hospital after being bedridden for several years. He was buried at Greenwood Memorial Park following a mass at St. Patrick's Cathedral. A Texas Historical Marker honoring his achievements stands near his grave.
