= Frances Daisy Emery Allen =

American physician (1876–1958)

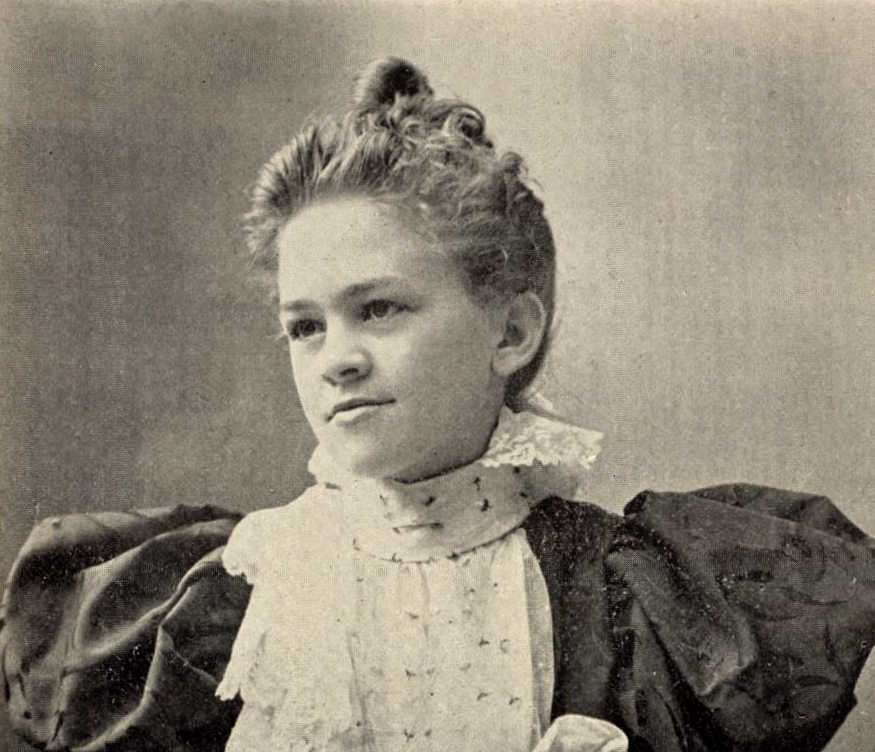
- Portrait of Allen from the 1898 Fort Worth University yearbook
- Born: Frances Daisy Emery; September 5, 1876; Kaufman County, Texas, US
- Died: December 7, 1958 (aged 82); Fort Worth, Texas, US
- Burial place: Greenwood Memorial Park
- Education: Fort Worth University
- Occupation: Physician

Frances Daisy Emery Allen (born Frances Daisy Emery; September 5, 1876 – December 7, 1958) was an American physician. She was the first female graduate of a medical college in the state of Texas and one of the first female physicians to practice in Tarrant County.

== Early life and education ==
Emery was born September 5, 1876, in Kaufman County, Texas, to James Wallace and Elizabeth Brown Emery. James Wallace Emery had a master's degree from Bowdoin College and had been an outspoken abolitionist in the 1850s. The ninth of twelve children, four-year-old Daisy announced her intentions to become a doctor, a goal encouraged by her parents. The Emery family moved to Fort Worth when Daisy was fourteen years old. She attended Fort Worth public schools, where her father was also a teacher, and graduated from Fort Worth High School.

Emery applied to and was initially refused admission to the medical college of Fort Worth University, but was admitted when she pointed out that no rules specifically excluded women from the school. She was thus admitted to the charter class of Fort Worth Medical College (also known as Fort Worth Medical School and Fort Worth School of Medicine) in 1894, where she was the only female student for a full year. In 1897, she graduated with honors, ranking second in a class of seventeen students. She had the distinction of being the first woman to graduate from a medical college in Texas.

== Career ==
Emery worked in private practice in Fort Worth for two years, making her one of the first female physicians in the Tarrant County. She also worked as an evaluating physician for Penn Mutual Life Insurance's female applicants. In 1899, she moved to Washington, D.C. for postgraduate education. She lived with a married sister in Maryland while completing an internship and residency at Women and Children's Hospital in Washington. There she became involved in women's suffrage, developing an interest in women's voting rights, attending lectures by Susan B. Anthony and other activists, and even sewing her own bloomers. Dr. Daisy Emery returned to Texas in 1901 to care for her mother, who was suffering from rheumatoid arthritis, and accepted a teaching position at Dallas Medical College.

In 1910, the Allens moved their practice a few miles east to Goldsboro, Texas, where their second daughter, Sheila Emery, was born; in 1912, they relocated again to Newark, Texas, about 20 miles northwest of Fort Worth. In December 1913, the Allens were planning to move to China as missionaries when Walter died unexpectedly during surgery to remove kidney stones.

Finding herself a widow at age 37, Allen packed up her two young children and returned to Fort Worth. She served as clinical professor of children's diseases at Fort Worth Medical College until Fort Worth University closed in 1917 and its medical school, which had been chartered separately, merged with Baylor College of Medicine.

Allen served on the staffs of Harris, All Saints, and St. Joseph hospitals in Fort Worth. She also treated patients at free clinics at City-County Hospital and the Wesley Center, where she delivered many of Fort Worth's babies. She was a founding member of the Fort Worth Academy of Medicine, a member of the Tarrant County Medical Society, the Tarrant County Association for Mental Health, the American Medical Women's Association, and was a life member of the Texas Medical Association.

Allen was a member of the League of Women Voters. She traveled the United States and Europe with her daughters and took them to political rallies. With her mother's influence, her daughter, Frances, became a social worker and pioneering advocate for child welfare in Texas and Illinois.

== Retirement and death ==
Allen retired from medicine in 1950, having practiced for more than half a century. She died of heart disease in Fort Worth on December 7, 1958, aged 82, and was buried at Greenwood Cemetery in Fort Worth. At her death, she owned extensive property in Runnels, Callahan, and Tarrant Counties, having accepted property in lieu of payment from patients. She is noted on the Texas Historical Marker at the site of the Fort Worth Medical College, near the intersection of 4th and Jones Streets in downtown Fort Worth.
