= Walter Poppe =

Walter Poppe may refer to:

- Walter Poppe (general) (1892–1968), German general
- Walter Poppe (footballer) (1886–1951), German footballer

== See also ==
- Walter Pope (disambiguation)
