= Fort Worth University =

Methodist college in Fort Worth, Texas (1881–1911)

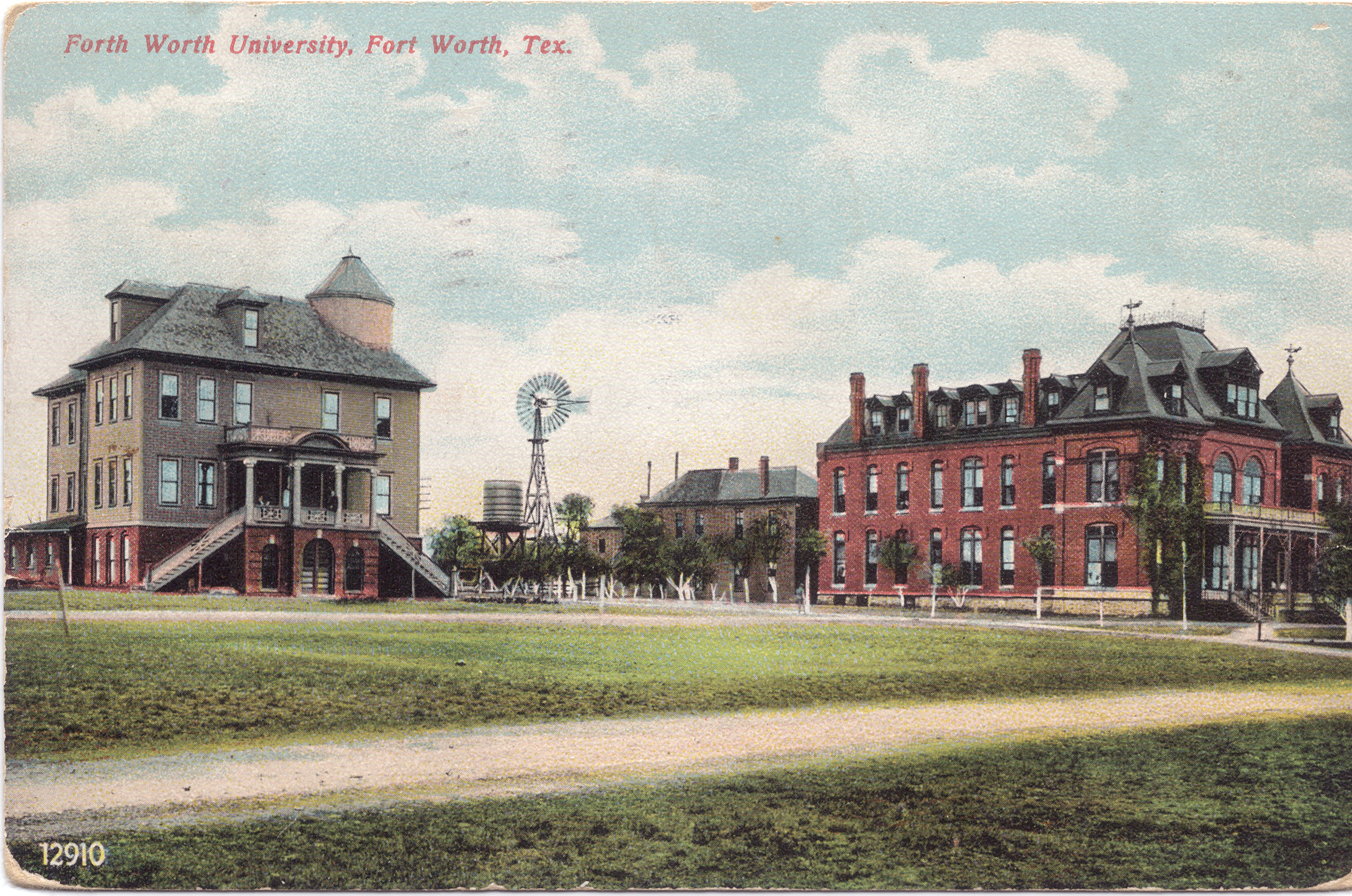
- 1908 postcard of Fort Worth University
- Former name: Texas Wesleyan College (1881–1889)
- Type: private
- Active: June 6, 1881–1911
- Religious affiliation: Methodist Episcopal Church
- Location: Fort Worth, Texas, United States
- Colors: Gold and Blue

Fort Worth University was a private Methodist Episcopal Church in Fort Worth, Texas. It was chartered and opened in 1881 as the Texas Wesleyan College. Its name changed to Fort Worth University in 1889. It merged with the Methodist University of Oklahoma (now Oklahoma City University) in 1911.

== History ==
Texas Wesleyan College was chartered on June 6, 1881, and opened in Fort Worth, Texas on September 7, 1881. The university was affiliated with the Methodist Episcopal Church and was a member of the University Senate of the church. The first president was William H. Cannon; later presidents included William Fielder and Oscar L. Fisher.

When it opened, the college had 123 students. In addition to its college program, it had a conservatory of music and a four-year preparatory academy. Under the leadership of Fielder, the college was recharted as Fort Worth University in June 1889. A new charter authorized a School of Law in August 1893, followed by a School of Medicine in July 1894.

In 1903, tuition was less than $200 a year, with board being $3 a week and a room costing fifty cents a week. The tuition at the School of Medicine was $75 a year, including lab fees.

The Fort Worth School of Medicine moved to a new building in downtown Fort Worth in 1905; its growth was no surprise as this was the only medical school in an area of 380,000 square miles with more than 4 million people. In 1908, Fort Worth College's total enrollment was 871 students, including 108 medical students and 163 university and academy students.

The university made an unsuccessful attempt to consolidate with Polytechnic College in 1910. Fort Worth University merged with Methodist University of Oklahoma (now Oklahoma City University), in Guthrie, Oklahoma in 1911. Its liberal arts department moved to Guthrie, while the School of Medicine, which was separately chartered, continued to operate as the Fort Worth School of Medicine until 1919; it merged with Texas Christian University which had moved to Fort Worth in 1910.

In 1913, the former campus was used by Bryant School, a boys preparatory school. The Fort Worth School District purchased the campus in 1915 and demolished the buildings the next year.

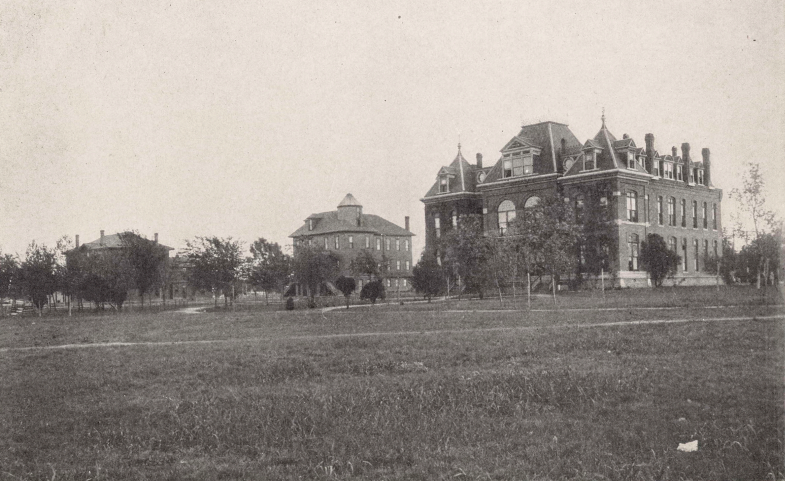
Fort Worth University's Cadet Hall (left), Science Hall (center), and University Hall (right)

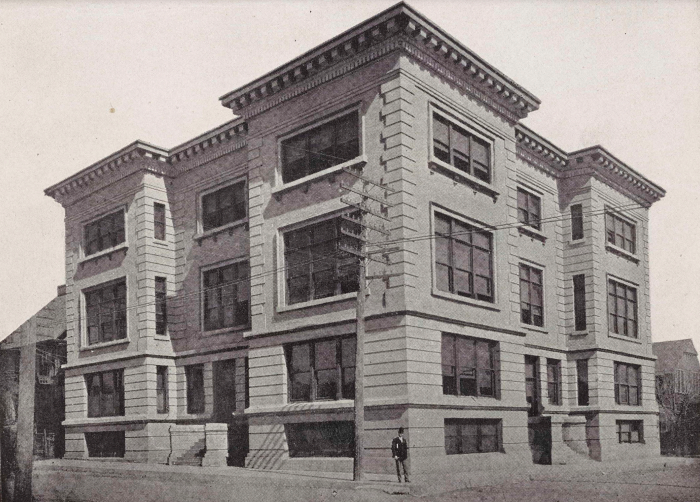
Fort Worth University School of Medicine, circa 1910

== Campus ==
After five years at a temporary location at Jennings and Thirteenth Streets in Fort Worth, the university moved to a ten-acre campus located south of the city in 1886. The campus included three newly constructed stone buildings. These included the three-story University Hall, Science Hall, and Dining Hall. A fourth building, Cadet Hall, was added at a later date. All four buildings included dormitories. The campus included a football field, a baseball field, a croquet lawn, and lawn tennis courts.

The School of Medicine was originally located on the main university campus but moved to Commerce and Seventh Streets in Fort Worth in 1896.

== Academics ==
Fort Worth College A.B., B.S., Ph.B., B.Lit, D.D., and Ph.D. degrees in the arts and sciences. Classes included traditional arts and sciences, including astronomy, Bible, biology, business, calculus, chemistry, Christian ethics, drawing and painting, economics, elocution, French, geology, geometry, German, Greek, history, instrumental and vocal music, Latin, literature, mathematics, pedagogy, philosophy, physics, physiology, psychology, sociology, and Spanish. It also includes a four-year preparatory academy and a military school. After the cadet corps was added in 1890, military training was required for male students.

Other programs included the Department of Oratory and Elocution, the Conservatory of Music, and a School of Commerce (later known as the Brantley-Draughon Business College ), with the latter being its most popular program. The university also offered advanced degrees, including an LL.B from its law school, and an M.D. from its medical school and school of pharmacy.

== Student life ==
Students were required to attend chapel and church. Fort Worth University had both a YMCA and a YWCA. The university's four literary societies were Kappa Gamma Chi and Phi Lambda for men and Alpha Theta and Zetagathean for women. The college was a member of the Texas State Oratorical Society and competed with seven other colleges. Its yearbook was The Lasso.

The Fort Worth School of Medicine had chapters of Beta Omicron Alpha, Delta Omicron Alpha, and Kappa Psi medical fraternities.

== Sports ==
Fort Worth University's colors were gold and blue. Its athletic program included football, baseball, and track. Its teams played against Austin College, Baylor University, Carlisle Military Academy, Dallas Medical College, Fort Worth High School, Polytechnic College, and Texas Christian University.

== Notable people ==
=== Alumni ===
- Frances Daisy Emery Allen (M.D., 1897), first female physician to graduate from a Texas medical school and the first licensed female physician in Texas
- Hazel Vaughn Leigh (Piano), founder and longtime director of the Fort Worth Boys Club
- William Duncan MacMillan (A.B., 1898), professor at the University of Chicago and is noted for research on physical cosmology and advanced textbooks on classical mechanics.
- Walter Elmer Pope, Texas House of Representatives and owner of the Corpus Christi Democrat newspaper
- Samuel Murray Robinson, United States Navy four-star admiral
- Houston B. Teehee, Oklahoma Supreme Court Commissioner, Register of the Treasury, and Oklahoma House of Representatives
- George Whitaker (M.D.), president of Wiley College, Willamette University and Portland University

=== Faculty ===
- William Duncan MacMillan, professor of astronomy
- Enoch J. Mills, head football coach
- Anna Shelton, English tutor
- D. M. Smith, mathematics instructor

== See also ==
- List of colleges and universities in Texas
- List of defunct medical schools in the United States
