= The Euterpean Club =

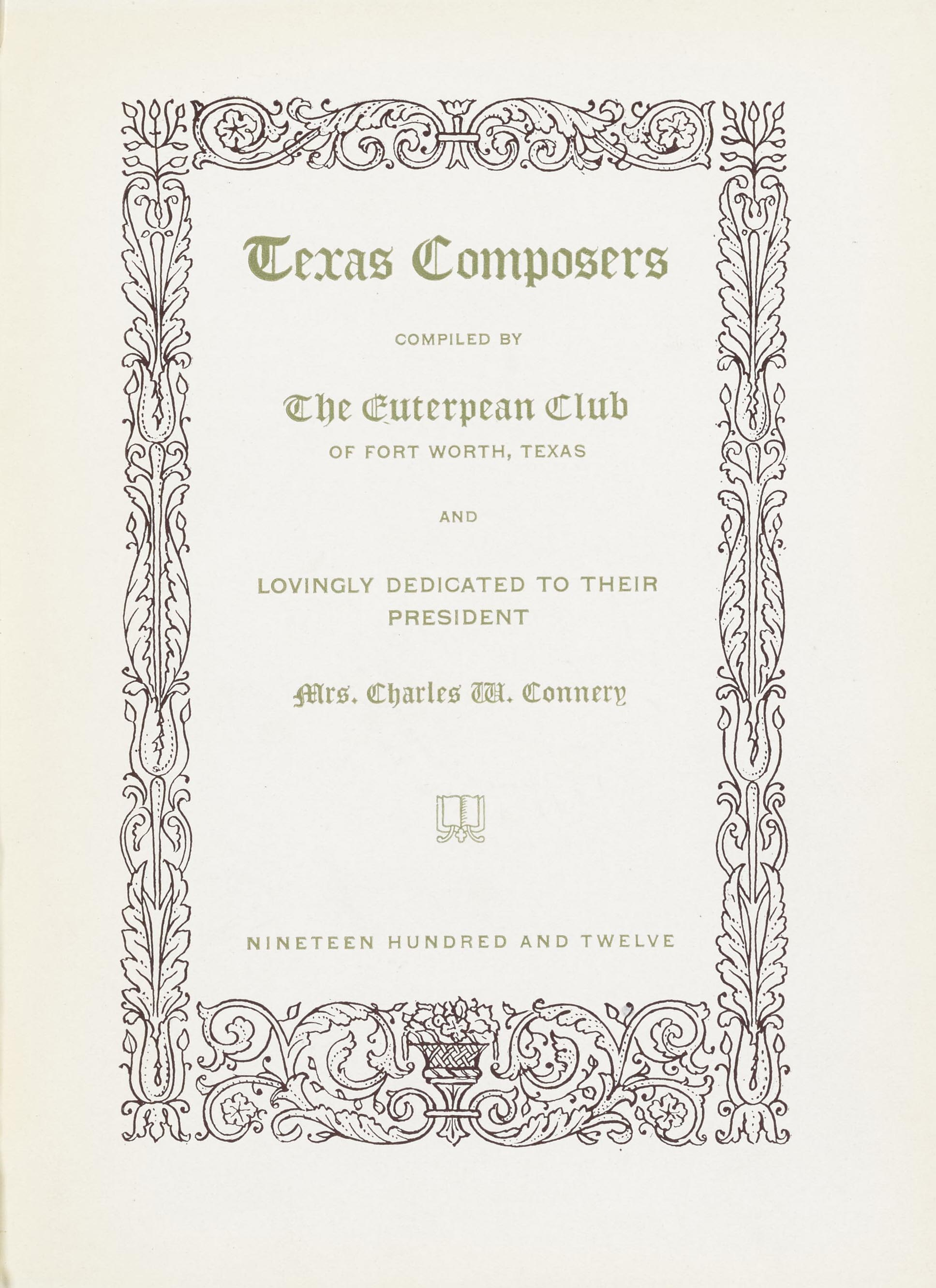
Title page from The Euterpean Club's 1912 book, "Texas Composers."

The Euterpean Club is the oldest women's music club in Fort Worth, Texas, and one of the oldest in the state. Established in 1896, the club was formed to provide women with the mission of "unsparing labor and devotion to the cause of Good Music." The club was admitted into the Texas Federation of Women's Clubs in 1901 and became a charter member of the Woman's Club of Fort Worth in 1923.

== History ==
=== The Derthick Club ===
The Euterpean Club was the creation of Wilber M. Derthick, a Chicago music critic, scholar, and author. In the 1880s and 1890s, Wilbur Derthick and his wife, May sent out "agents" to organize local music clubs. These Derthick Music-Literary Clubs had a curriculum developed by the Derthicks, using a flashcard-based game to teach music history, theory, and biography. By 1895, Derthick claimed to have founded over 200 such clubs. The Fort Worth club was one of many in Texas, which had over 400 active music clubs, the most of any US state. The Derthick Club of Fort Worth had its first meeting in the home of Ida Jane (Mrs. Bacon) Saunders in 1896, with subsequent meetings at various members' homes.

=== Euterpean Club ===
The club declared its independence from the Derthick system in 1898, renaming itself the Euterpean Club after Euterpe, the Greek muse of music and lyric poetry. It abandoned the Derthick curriculum, but maintained the same membership roster. Biweekly meetings were held in members' homes, the Academy of Music, St. Paul's Methodist Church, and the Metropolitan Hotel.

In 1900, the Euterpean Club joined Fort Worth's City Federation; the following year it became a delegate to the Texas Federation of Women's Clubs. In 1910, the co-ed Juvenile Euterpean Club was established, the first music club for children in Texas. The Euterpean Club's long-running contest for original musical compositions resulted in a 1912 book called Texas Composers. During World War I, the club's Camp Bowie War Service Committee served lunches at the army camp on Fort Worth's west side, organized weekly concerts at the local YWCA, and performed weekly organ concerts for soldiers at the First Christian Church.

In 1922, the club began a series of nationally broadcast performances on local radio station, WBAP, and started the Junior Euterpean Club, a coed group for children ages 8–14. In 1923, the club helped found the Woman's Club of Fort Worth, celebrated a silver anniversary with a performance that drew an audience of over 1200, and formed a chamber music society. Directed by Brooks Morris, the chamber group became the foundation of the Fort Worth Symphony Orchestra.

In 1926 the club put on two concerts with multiple pianos playing the same classical pieces in unison. The concerts, with respectively 12 or 20 pianos, were directed by Carl Venth, dean of Texas Woman's College (now known as Texas Wesleyan University). Venth was also the Euterpean Club's choral director in 1930 and 1931.

The club organized programs for the state centennial celebration, featuring Texas composers Radie Britain, David Guion, William J. Marsh, Oscar J. Fox, and Carl Venth. In 1939, it held a special memorial program with musicians from Southern Methodist University for the late Anna Shelton, founder and longtime president of the Woman's Club of Fort Worth, and also hosted the statewide convention of the Texas Federation of Music Clubs. During World War II, the club programs featured performers from the Fort Worth Army Airfield, Camp Wolters, and other Texas military installations. Members volunteered as USO workers and WAC recruiters, worked at hospitals, sold war bonds, and donated a piano to the Fort Worth Army Airfield.

In 1959, a scholarship fund was established. Since that time, a scholarship has been awarded annually to a local college or university student.

The Euterpean Club remains an active club under the auspices of The Woman's Club of Fort Worth. They plan programs that include performance and study in various areas such as strings, dance, opera, jazz, American Music, sacred music and more. They continue to award an annual club scholarship to a local college music major. They have preserved many of their club historical artifacts, books, articles, yearbooks, club records and documents and share them with displays at special events such as their recent Founder's Day Program on January 19, 2022, at which they were presented a City of Fort Worth Mayoral Proclamation recognizing their 125th Anniversary. In honor of their anniversary and preservation of their history and artifacts, club Historian Nancy Dobbs was presented the NSDAR Excellence in Historic Preservation Award on March 2, 2022, by the Mary Isham Keith Chapter NSDAR.

== Notable members ==
- Actress and dancer Ginger Rogers was a member of the Juvenile Euterpean Club.
- Hallie Samuel (Mrs. M.P.) Bewley, the "mother of art" in the Texas women's club movement
- Ida Jane (Mrs. Bacon) Saunders, prominent local woman's club leader
- Honorary members opera singer Helen Fouts Cahoon, composer Carl Venth, local women's club figures Anna Shelton and Etta Newby, and Star-Telegram music critic E. Clyde Whitlock

== Notable performers ==
- Merle Alcock
- Olive Kline
- Samuel S. Losh
- Flonzaley Quartet
- Florence Macbeth
- José Mojica
- Lambert Murphy
- Elly Ney
- E. Robert Schmitz
- Oscar Seagle
- Bernard U. Taylor
- Stuart Walker Portmanteau Theatre
- Reinald Werrenrath

== Premieres ==
Several notable musical works were premiered at Euterpean Club events:

- The White Enchantment by Charles Wakefield Cadman
- The Black Knight by Edward Elgar
- Hora Novissima by Horatio Parker
- The King's Henchman by Deems Taylor with libretto by Edna St. Vincent Millay
- The first full performance of Samuel Coleridge-Taylor's cantata series, The Song of Hiawatha

== Additional resources ==
- Euterpean Club yearbooks (1928–2020) in the Fort Worth Public Library Archives
- Texas Composers book in the Fort Worth Public Library Digital Archives
