= Mary Daggett Lake =

American historian, botanist, and educator

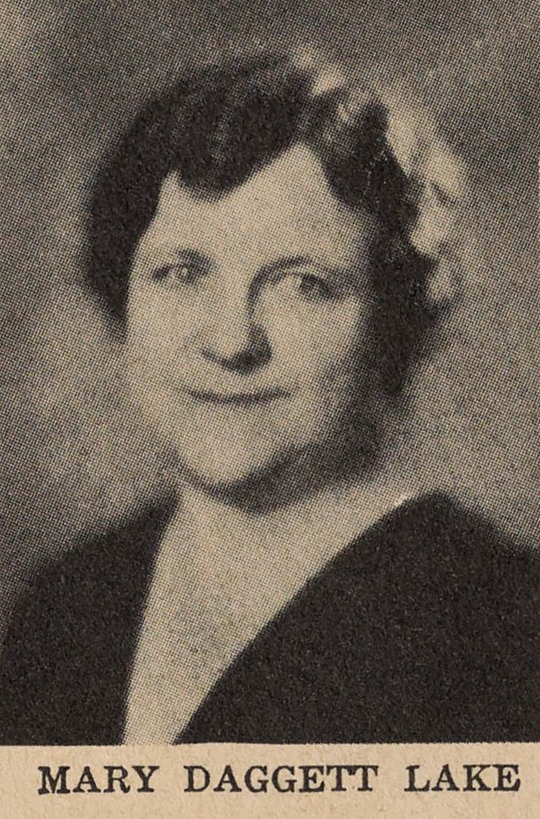
Portrait of Mary Daggett Lake in the 1930s

Mary Daggett Lake (1880–1955) was an American historian, botanist, and educator instrumental in documenting early North Texas settlers and promoting the appreciation and use of native Texas plants. A Fort Worth, Texas civic leader, she led the garden club movement in Texas, wrote numerous columns for state and local newspapers, and was instrumental in the creation of the Fort Worth Botanic Garden, the oldest botanical garden in Texas.

== Early life and education ==
Mary Sabina Daggett was born November 11, 1880, in Fort Worth, Texas to Ephraim Merrill "Bud" and Laura Alice Palmer Daggett. Mary's father, a cowboy and trail driver-turned-cattleman, came from a family of local pioneers: his uncle and namesake, Ephraim Merrill Daggett (1810-1883) is known as the "Father of Fort Worth." She attended Fort Worth public schools and studied botany and music at Cottey College, a women's liberal arts college in Missouri.

== Career ==
She returned to Fort Worth and married William Fletcher Lake, a local cattleman, in March 1899; they had three children together.

=== Local historian ===
A dedicated genealogist, Mary Daggett Lake was a member of the Daughters of the American Revolution and Daughters of the Republic of Texas. She conducted extensive research into the history of North Texas, especially Fort Worth and the nearby settlements of Bird's Fort, Grapevine Springs, Denton, and Fort Belknap. She wrote a series of articles on Tarrant County's first settlers, based on interviews and written accounts from surviving family members, which ran in the Fort Worth Star-Telegram from 1926 to 1938. She was also the historical research chairman of the 1936 Texas Centennial. Mary Daggett Lake was a charter member of The Woman's Club of Fort Worth establishing its Texana library in 1932.

=== Botanist and educator ===
Mary Daggett Lake studied botany at Cottey College and worked for twelve years in the private herbarium of Dr. Albert Ruth, which is now part of the Botanical Research Institute of Texas collection. She was a charter member of the Fort Worth Garden Club, an officer in the National Council of State Garden Club Federations, and elected president of the Texas Federation of Garden Clubs in 1938. She was a 28-year member of the Fort Worth Park Board and editor of the Fort Worth Star-Telegram's gardening page from 1937 to 1955. With Eula Whitehouse, she co-wrote the "Wildflowers of Texas" column in the Texas Almanac.

From 1933 to 1955, Mary Daggett Lake was the educational director of the Garden Center of Fort Worth, now called the Fort Worth Botanic Garden, providing gardening and nature instruction for children and adults. She organized conferences at state colleges and universities on soil conservation and the benefits of native plants before World War II; during wartime she promoted gardening as a patriotic duty and the propagation of native fruit- and nut-bearing plants to bolster the limited food supply.

In 1996, the Fort Worth Garden Club library was renamed the Mary Daggett Lake Library, and a Texas Historical Marker in her honor was placed at the Fort Worth Botanic Garden in 2001.

=== Other publications ===
In 1926, Mary Daggett Lake wrote The Legend of the Bluebonnet, a short book on the folklore of the state flower of Texas. She also wrote Have You Ever Been to Texas in the Spring?, the official song of the Texas Federation of Garden Clubs, and Pioneer Mother, the official song of the Daughters of the Republic of Texas.

== Death ==
Mary Daggett Lake had a stroke at the Fort Worth Woman's Club on January 7, 1955, and died on March 1, 1955. She is buried at Mount Olivet Cemetery in Fort Worth.
