= Walter Elmer Pope =

American politician

Walter Elmer Pope (February 9, 1879 – November 2, 1944) was an American lawyer, politician, and newspaper editor.

Born in Leon County, Texas, Pope went to the Leon public schools. He graduated from Burnetta College and went to the Fort Worth University. In 1902, he graduated from University of Texas School of Law and was admitted to the Texas bar. Pope practiced law in Madisonville, Texas, and served as district attorney. In 1908, Pope and his family moved to Corpus Christi, Texas, where he continued to practice law. He owned the Corpus Christi Democrat newspaper and was in the real estate business in Corpus Christi. From 1917 to 1925 and then from 1929 to 1941, Pope served in the Texas House of Representatives and was a Democrat. Pope died in Corpus Christi, Texas after suffering a stroke.
