= Greenwood Memorial Park (Fort Worth, Texas) =

Cemetery in Fort Worth, Texas

- Interactive map of Greenwood Memorial Park

Details
- Location: Fort Worth, Texas
- Country: United States
- Coordinates: 32.763°N 97.366°W

Greenwood Memorial Park at White Settlement Road and Boland Street in Fort Worth, Texas, has been a perpetual care commercial cemetery since its dedication in 1909. The Mount Olivet Corporation, a non-profit organization was founded by the Bailey family of Fort Worth. The organization is overseen by a local elected board of trustees.

The entrance has replicas of statues of the Four Horses from St. Mark's Basilica in Venice. The cathedral made new bronze copies for its balcony after the originals were moved to its museum, and the Greenwood acquired similar copies to guard its entrance. The Horses are among the city's most recognized public outdoor art.

The Greenwood Mausoleum by Harwell Hamilton Harris opened in 1961, occasioning an award of honor from the Texas Society of Architects. Artist Wilbert Verhelst created the artwork and fountains for its peaceful interior. The Mausoleum's Independence Chapel holds life-size statues of the United States' founding patriots and a 12-foot mosaic of the Great Seal of the United States. The Mausoleum will eventually provide space for 70,000 persons; it is designed to be built incrementally over years.

== Notable graves ==
- Commonwealth War Graves Commission memorial to British Royal Flying Corps and Royal Air Force members, stationed at nearby Camp Taliaferro during World War I, eleven of whom are buried in this cemetery.
- Dr. Daisy Emery Allen, early Fort Worth physician and first woman graduate of a Texas medical school
- Bobby Bragan, former player for the Brooklyn Dodgers and the first manager of the Atlanta Braves
- Rildia Bee O'Bryan Cliburn, mother of concert pianist Van Cliburn.
- Eddie Chiles, founder of the Western Company and one-time owner of the Texas Rangers.
- Van Cliburn, classical pianist
- Pete Donohue, former pitcher best known for being a member of the Cincinnati Reds
- Lawrence Clifton Elliot, an aviation pioneer who developed domestic flight routes.
- Ormer Locklear, barnstormer and stunt pilot for Universal Studios.
- William John Marsh, composer of "Texas, Our Texas."
- Bill McCahan, former Athletics pitcher who threw a no-hitter in 1947
- Blanche McVeigh, artist and art educator
- Roy Roberts, actor (The Gale Storm Show and The Beverly Hillbillies)
- Rod Roddy, famous announcer for The Price Is Right
- Ben Hogan, professional golfer; 64 Tour Victories, 9 major championships
- Tex Beneke, big band singer, musician, and actor
