= Jennie Scott Scheuber =

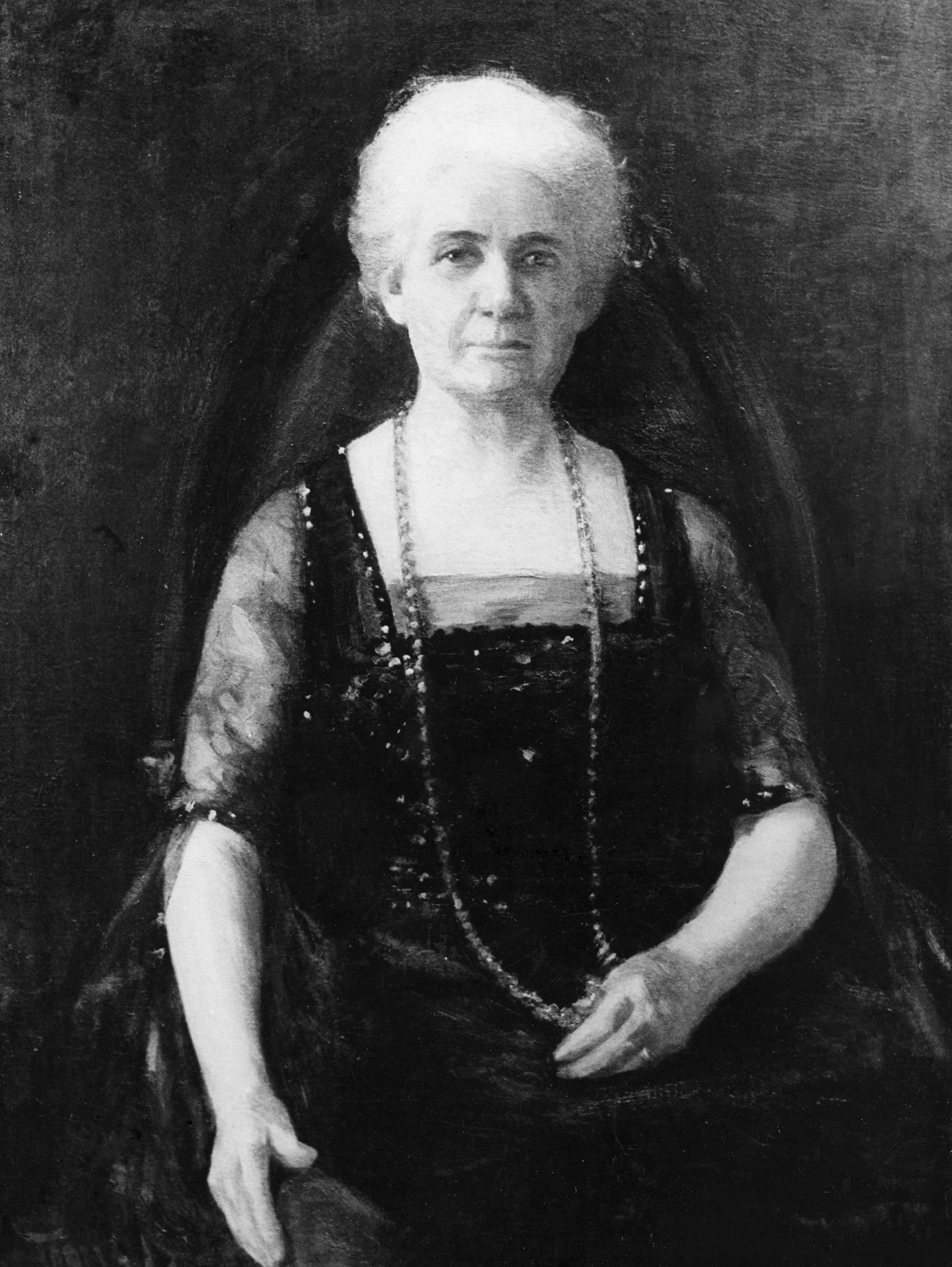
Portrait of Jennie Scott Scheuber by Robert Vonnoh.

Jennie Scott Scheuber (1860–1944) was an American librarian who pioneered the public library movement in Texas. A prominent Fort Worth, Texas, civic leader, she was instrumental in the formation of the Fort Worth public library system and the first art museum in Fort Worth.

== Early life ==
Jennie Scott was born January 6, 1860, in Plaquemine, Louisiana, to Maurice and Louise Imlar Scott, immigrants from Alsace and Leipzig, respectively. The family moved to New Orleans after the Civil War and relocated to Fort Worth, Texas in 1873, the same year that city was incorporated; by 1877 the Scotts were proprietors of the Cosmopolitan Hotel on Fort Worth's Main Street. Largely educated at home, Jennie Scott was a member of the Thespian Club and an officer in its successor, the El Paso Literary and Music Society, as a teen. In 1881, she married Charles Scheuber, also an immigrant from Alsace, who operated a wholesale liquor business; the couple's only son, Frank, was born the following year.

In 1889, Jennie Scott Scheuber was named secretary of the Texas Spring Palace women's organization, responsible for decorating the building's White and Gold Room. She was a charter member of the Women's Wednesday Club, becoming the organization's literary director in 1890, and helped form the Associated Charities organization the same year. She was also an active member of The Woman's Club of Fort Worth, though she was critical of some of the club's rules, which she considered too old-fashioned to continue attracting new members.

== Career ==
=== The Fort Worth Public Library Association and Carnegie Public Library ===
In April 1892, the Fort Worth Public Library Association was formed at the Scheuber home. With thirteen women as trustees and no financial backing, the group was unable to gain traction in its goal of building Fort Worth's first public library and art gallery. After the sudden death of her husband, Jennie Scott Scheuber moved to Massachusetts so her son could attend the Worcester Academy; while living in Worcester, she worked in a bookstore in order to learn the trade. Back in Fort Worth, the Fort Worth Public Library Association grew to include 426 members and secured a $50,000 grant from Andrew Carnegie to open its long-awaited public library, to be called the Carnegie Public Library of Fort Worth. In 1900, Jennie Scott Scheuber was chosen to be the city's first public librarian. In preparation, she enrolled in the Amherst College Summer School of Library Economy, the only formal library science education she would undertake in her career. The Carnegie Public Library of Fort Worth opened on October 17, 1901, and continued under Scheuber's direction until her retirement in 1938.

Jennie Scott Scheuber was instrumental in extending the public library's reach to other local communities. During World War I, she was the acting librarian at Camp Bowie and maintained small libraries at the army hospital, YMCA, and Knights of Columbus Hall. In 1921, she led the opening of the library's first branch in Fort Worth's Northside. The following year, Scheuber and the Fort Worth Public Library Association formed the Tarrant County Free Library to provide library services to smaller towns in the then largely rural area.

=== Fort Worth Museum of Art ===
Opening a public art gallery had been one of Jennie Scott Scheuber's goals since the Fort Worth Public Library Association was formed in 1892. By 1904, the second floor of the Carnegie Public Library was being used as gallery space for exhibitions sponsored by Fort Worth women's clubs. In 1910, the Fort Worth Art Association was formed within the Fort Worth Public Library Association, with Scheuber named ex officio secretary of the organization, and established the Fort Worth Museum of Art. The museum held exhibits in the Carnegie Public Library's art gallery until it officially separated from the library in 1939, shortly after Scheuber's retirement. The former Carnegie Public Library Art Gallery has undergone several name changes and shifts in mission. The Modern Art Museum of Fort Worth, as it is now known, is a world-class museum housed in a building designed by Tadao Ando in the Fort Worth Cultural District. "The Modern" is the first art museum in Fort Worth and is the oldest art museum in Texas.

=== Other Organizations ===
In addition to managing the Carnegie Public Library for 38 years, Scheuber was involved with several other civic causes and professional organizations. She was an active participant in the women's suffrage movement as an early member of the League of Women Voters, a member of the Fort Worth Equal Suffrage Association, and a delegate to Texas's Democratic convention in 1918 and 1920. Scheuber was the first woman president of the Texas Library Association; vice president of the American Federation of Arts from 1911 to 1917; and chairman of the board of the Fort Worth Children's Hospital, which she helped found in 1919. In 1928, she was presented with a portrait by American Impressionist painter Robert Vonnoh, which now hangs in Fort Worth's Central Library; she was honored as a library pioneer by the Texas Library Association in 1935.

== Death ==
Scheuber suffered a heart attack in April 1944 and died May 2, 1944. Per her wishes, she was given a private funeral in her Arlington Heights apartment and buried in Fort Worth's Oakwood Cemetery.
