= Fort Worth Public Library =

Coordinates: 32.7541°N 97.3348°W

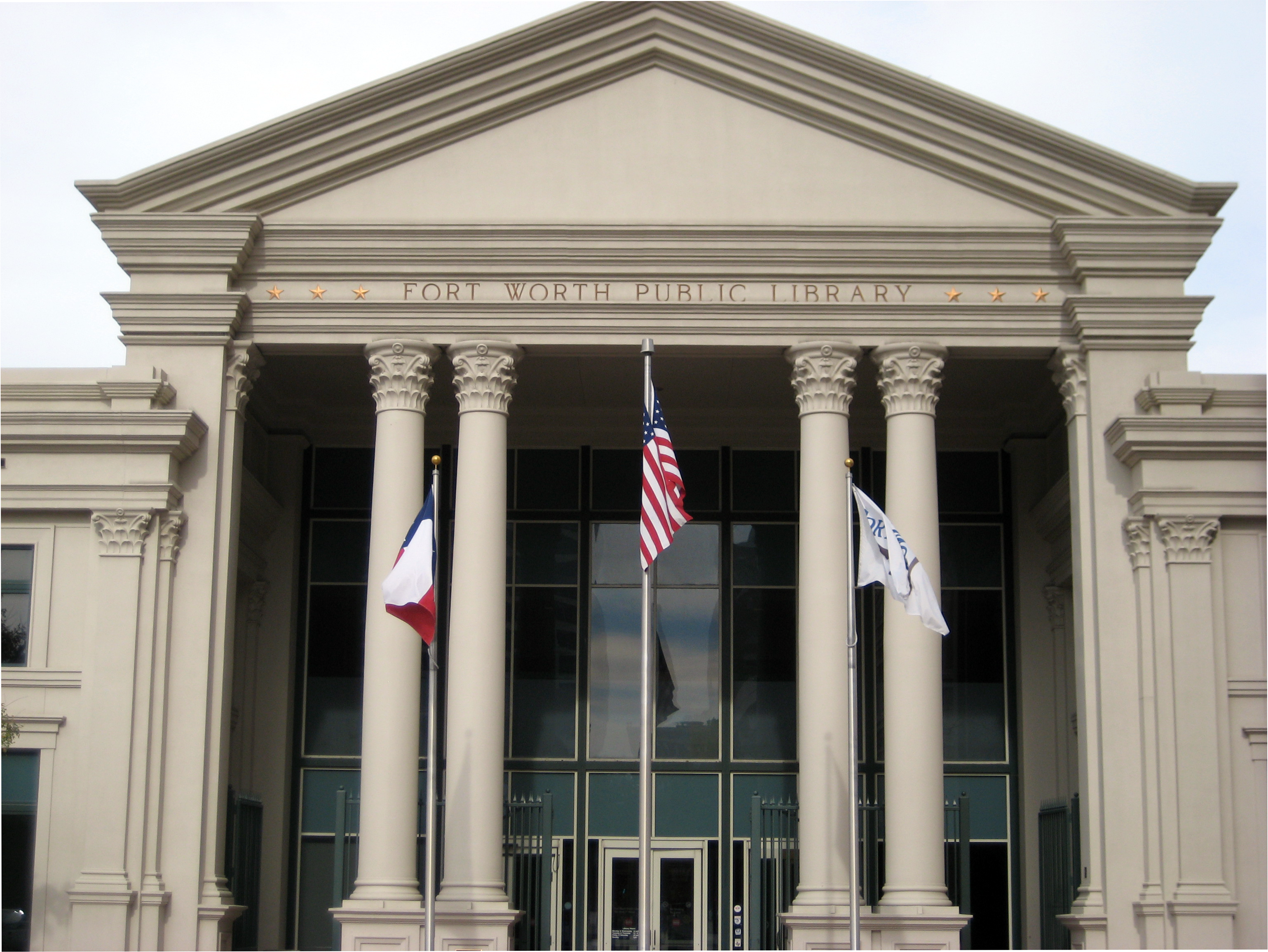
- Location: Fort Worth, Texas
- Established: 1901
- Branches: 18

Collection
- Size: 2.065 million

Access and use
- Circulation: 4 million
- Population served: 686,850

Other information
- Budget: $16,994,721
- Director: Midori Clark
- Employees: 207

Fort Worth Public Library is the public library system that serves the city of Fort Worth, Texas. The Fort Worth Public Libraries consist of 18 branches including the central library and two regional libraries.

== History ==
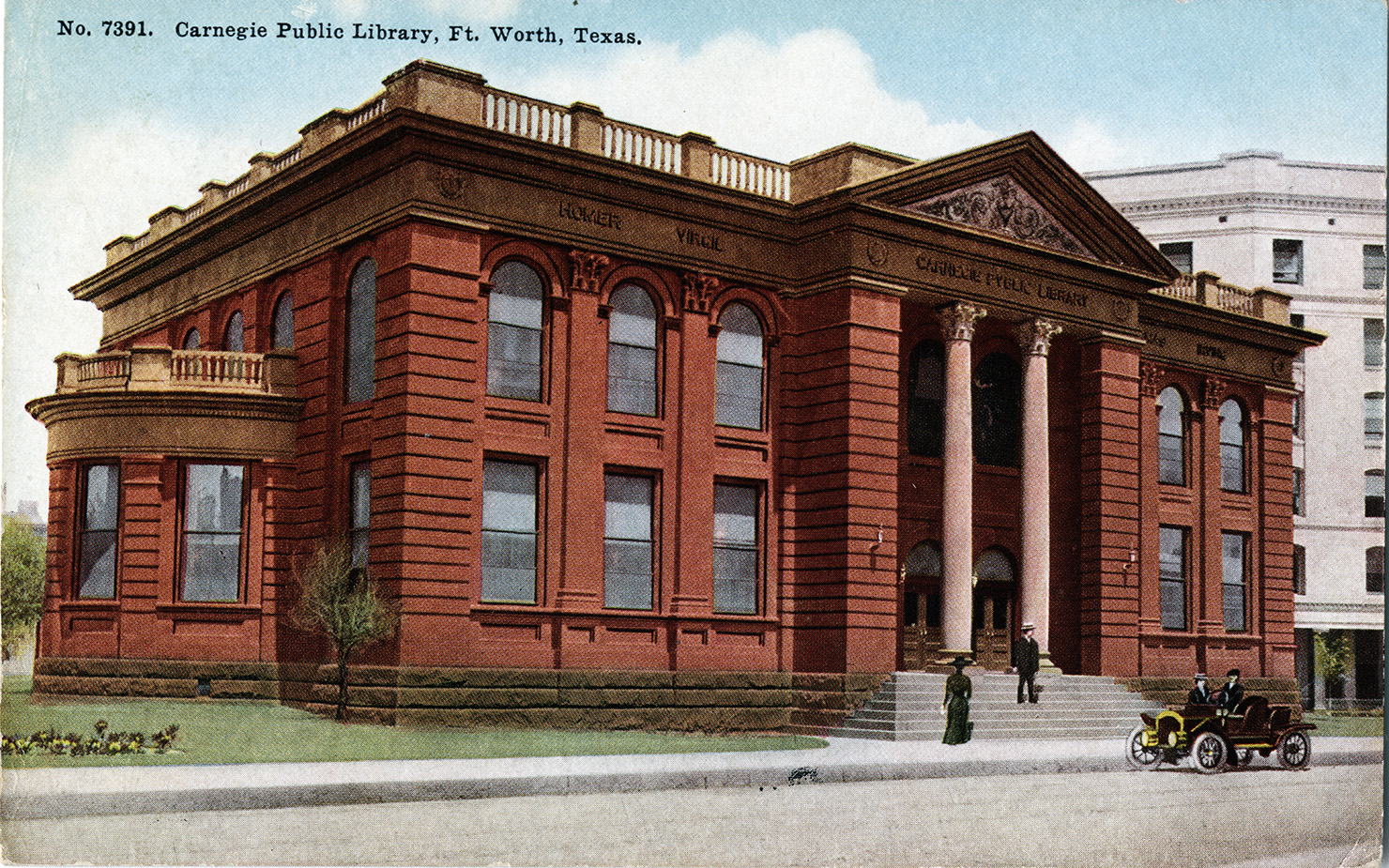
Postcard of the Carnegie Public Library in Fort Worth, undated

In April 1892, 20 women formed the idea for the city's first library while meeting at the home of Jennie Scott Scheuber. Under the Fort Worth Public Library Association, this association received its state charter and with the financial support from Andrew Carnegie they brought the Fort Worth Public Library into existence. Carnegie donated building funds for the construction of more than 2,000 libraries in the United States and from 1886 to 1919 he donated $56 million. Carnegie suggested to the founding women that they ask the local gentlemen for "the price of a good cigar" to help raise the necessary local supporting funds. Sarah Gray Jennings donated the land at 915 Throckmorton Street on stipulation that it always be used for a library. When the City Council approved spending $4,000 per year to run the library, Carnegie contributed $50,000 for the building. The Carnegie Public Library of Fort Worth opened on October 17, 1901, at Ninth and Throckmorton streets.

== The PWA Library ==
As early as 1926 it was becoming clear that the Carnegie funded building was no longer large enough to handle Fort Worth’s swelling population. The situation became worse during the onset of the Great Depression, when reading rooms became so full that the facility lacked enough chairs or lights at most hours of the day and night. The library board appealed to the Public Works Administration (PWA) in 1933 for funds with $400,000 in subsidies finally arrived in Fort Worth in 1937. A three-story, triangular PWA Moderne structure designed by Joseph R. Pelich was built over the spot of the old neoclassical Carnegie library and opened in 1938. Mrs. Scheuber was retired from her role as head librarian and replaced with the professionally trained Harry Peterson, who converted the collection to the Dewey Decimal System and removed the library’s collection of relics to the local children’s museum. In 1967 the building received a Texas Historical Marker in 1967.

In 1978 a new central library building was built at 300 Taylor Street. The old Art Deco building was returned to the ownership of the Sarah Gray Jennings estate in 1980, and although attempts were made to preserve the building as a performing arts center, the old library was razed in 1990 for a parking lot.

== Central Library Expansion ==
Fort Worth's Central Library expansion officially opened October 22, 1999. On March 28, 2000 the Fort Worth Tornado caused over a million dollars in damage to the new Central Library.

Central Library has a spacious Learning Commons for patrons to enjoy a book, magazine, or use a computer. The Central Library also offers its users free Internet access at the computer lab or with WiFi. Computer classes are available to promote information literacy. The Genealogy, Local History and Archives unit is housed within the Central Library; the Archives are also the official municipal archives of the City of Fort Worth.

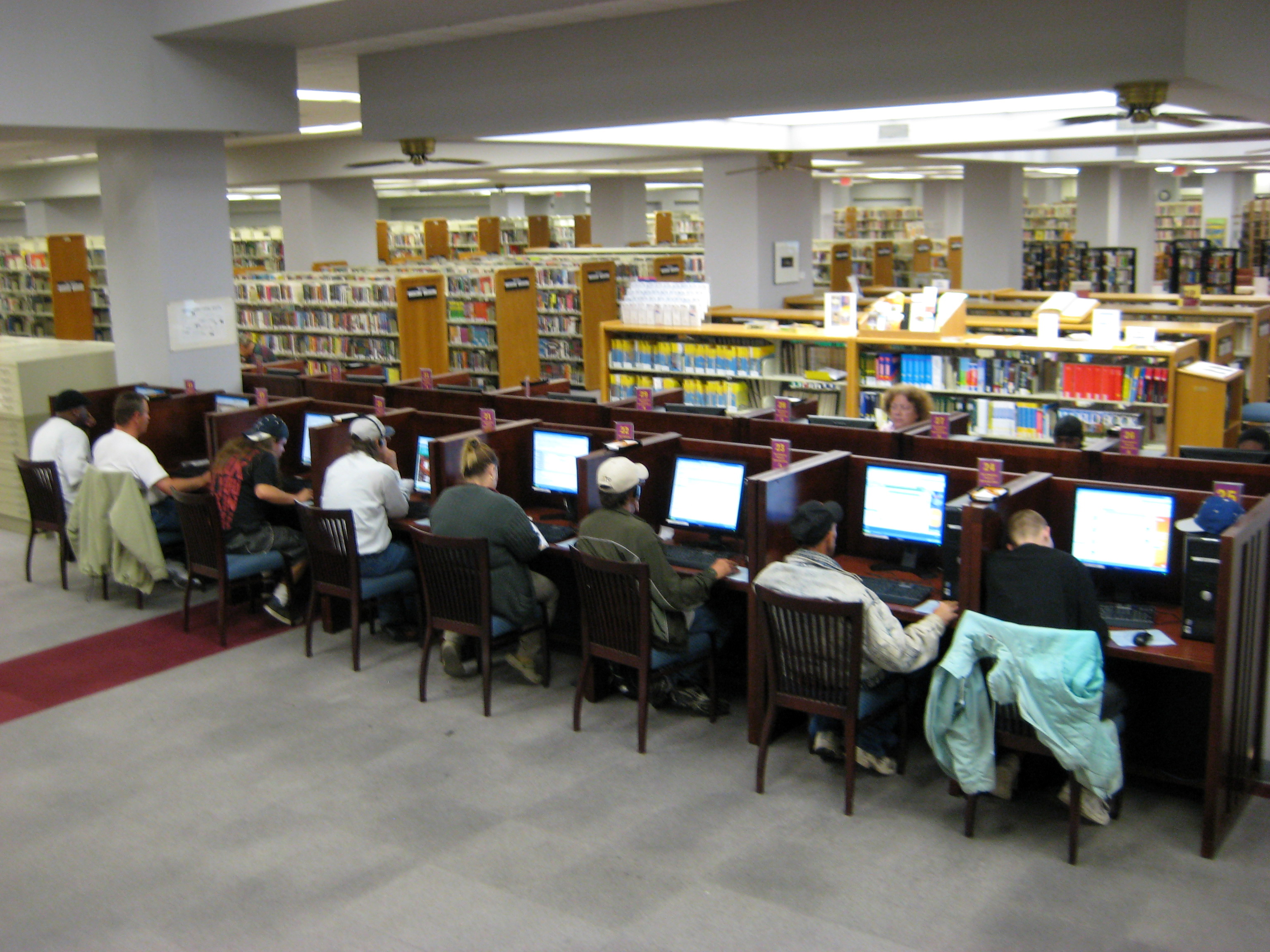
Fort Worth Central Library Computer Lab

Central Library only opened up the street level in April 2021. In accordance with the Strategic Services Plan of 2019-2021, the building at 500 W. 3rd Street was put up for sale.

== Regional Libraries ==
- East Regional – opened (1996; 30 years ago)
- Southwest Regional – opened (1987; 39 years ago)
- Golden Triangle Regional - elevated to regional (2025; 1 year ago)

== Branches ==
- Diamond Hill/Jarvis – opened (1989; 37 years ago)
- East Berry – opened (1967; 59 years ago)
- Meadowbrook – opened (1964; 62 years ago)
- Northside – opened (1967; 59 years ago)
- Ridglea – opened (1967; 59 years ago)
- Riverside – opened (1967; 59 years ago)
- Seminary South – opened (1967; 59 years ago)
- Ella Mae Shamblee – opened (2008; 18 years ago)
- Summerglen – opened (2000; 26 years ago)
- Wedgwood – opened (1962; 64 years ago)
- Northwest – opened (2010; 16 years ago)
- Golden Triangle – opened (August 18, 2020; 6 years ago)
- Reby Cary Youth – opened (August 14, 2021; 5 years ago)
- La Gran Biblioteca - opened (February 26, 2022; 4 years ago)
- Fort Worth History Center - opened (October 22, 2022; 3 years ago)
