= First Christian Church (Fort Worth, Texas) =

- U.S. National Register of Historic Places
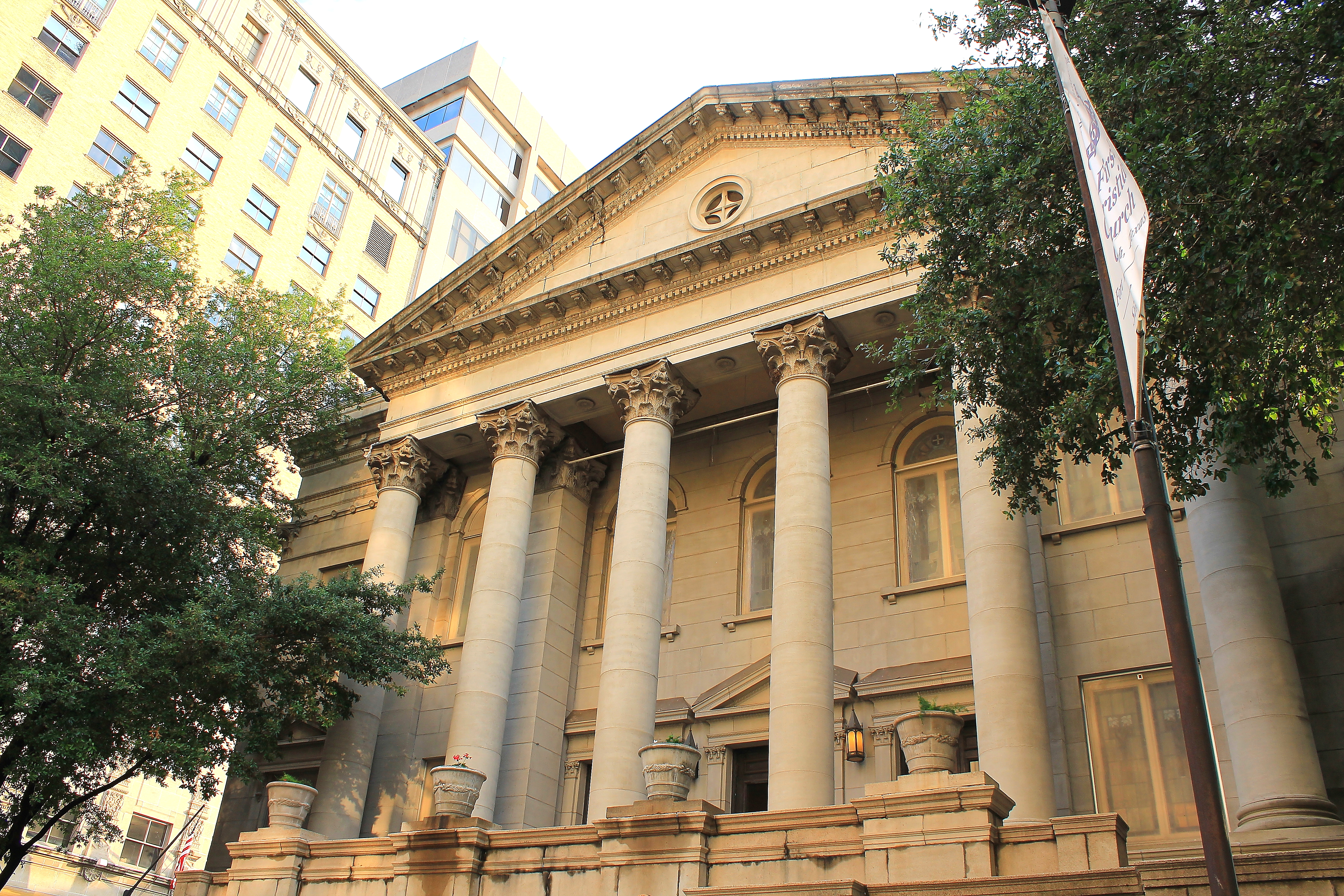
- First Christian Church in 2012

- Location within Texas Location within the United States
- Location: 612 Throckmorton St., Fort Worth, Texas
- Coordinates: 32°45′09″N 97°19′55″W
- Area: less than one acre
- Built: 1915
- Architect: Van Slyke & Woodruff
- Architectural style: Beaux Arts, Renaissance
- Website: First Christian Church
- NRHP reference No.: 83003812
- Added to NRHP: October 6, 1983

First Christian Church is a historic church at 612 Throckmorton Street in Fort Worth, Texas. It was founded in 1855, making it the oldest continuously operating church established in Fort Worth, Texas. The present building at 6th and Throckmorton dates back to 1915. It was designed by architects E.W. Van Slyke and Clyde Woodruff in a Renaissance Revival style. The raised two-story limestone building has a Greek Cross plan with a tower and copper-clad dome at the crossing and three porticos with Corinthian columns. The building was listed on the National Register of Historic Places in 1983 and received the Fort Worth Historical and Cultural Landmarks Designation in 2006.

== History ==
- 1855: First Christian was organized in the home of Dr. and Mrs. Carroll Peak on the 2nd Sunday in June. The first pastor was Mr. A.M. Dean. and the second pastor was Dr. B.F. Hall, DDS.
- 1857: The first Sunday school was organized at Masonic building on the northeast corner of Belknap and Grove Streets.
- 1865-70: Rev. J.A. Clark founded Add-Ran College in the FCC building, naming it for the son of Addison Clark, who had been named after Addison and Randolf. Randolf suggested naming the school after the child. It was the first Public school, Col. John Peter Smith was the first teacher.
- 1870: The first building site of the congregation was at Main and Houston, 4th and 5th Streets.
- 1878: "Rock" church built on site at 612 Throckmorton. The lot was purchased for $1,500.
- 1897: Magnolia Avenue Christian, an offshoot of First Christian, was established.
- 1914: The current First Christian Church Sanctuary building was erected on the site of former location.
- 1912-61: During Dr. L. D. Anderson's 49-year ministry, membership reached 3,000.
- 1947: A wood carving of "The Last Supper" was dedicated.
- 1961-73: During Dr. N. Quentin Grey's 12-year ministry, Dial-a-Prayer and Memorial Fund were established.
- 1980: On the 125th Anniversary, Founders' Fund for church programs was established.
- 1986: Renovation Phase I was completed.
- 1991: Renovation Phase II was completed.
- 1993: Renovation Phase III was completed.

== Photo gallery ==
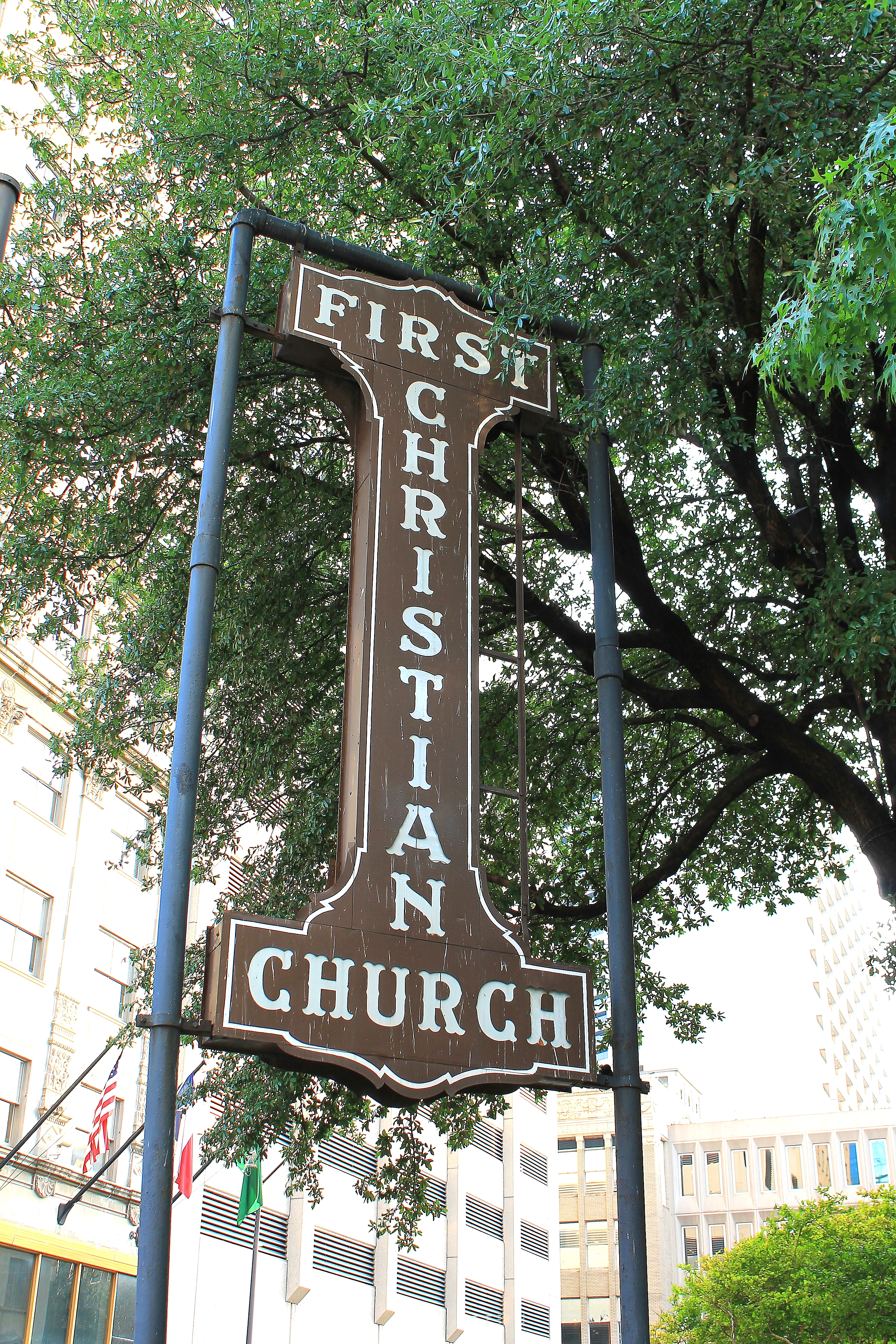

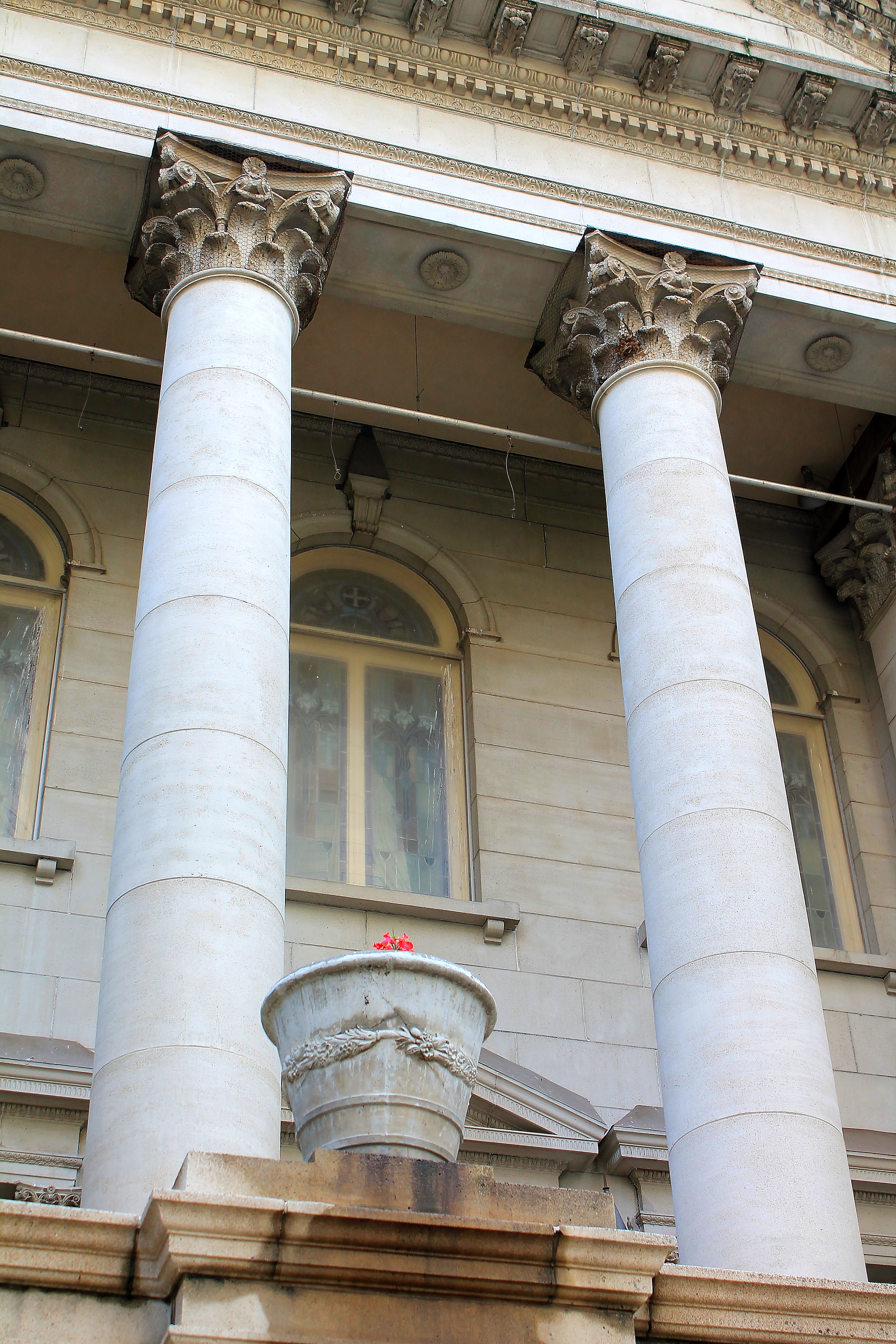

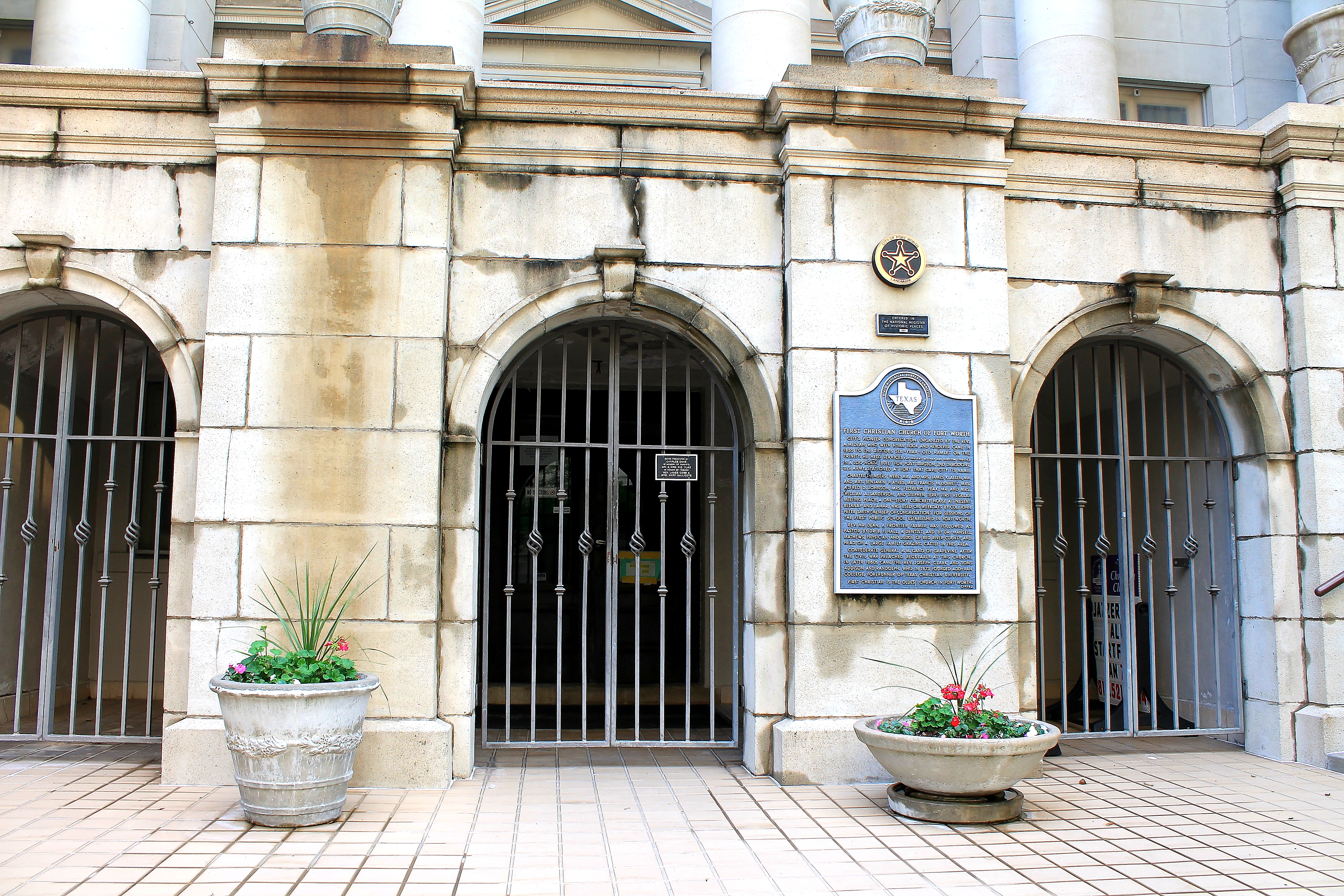

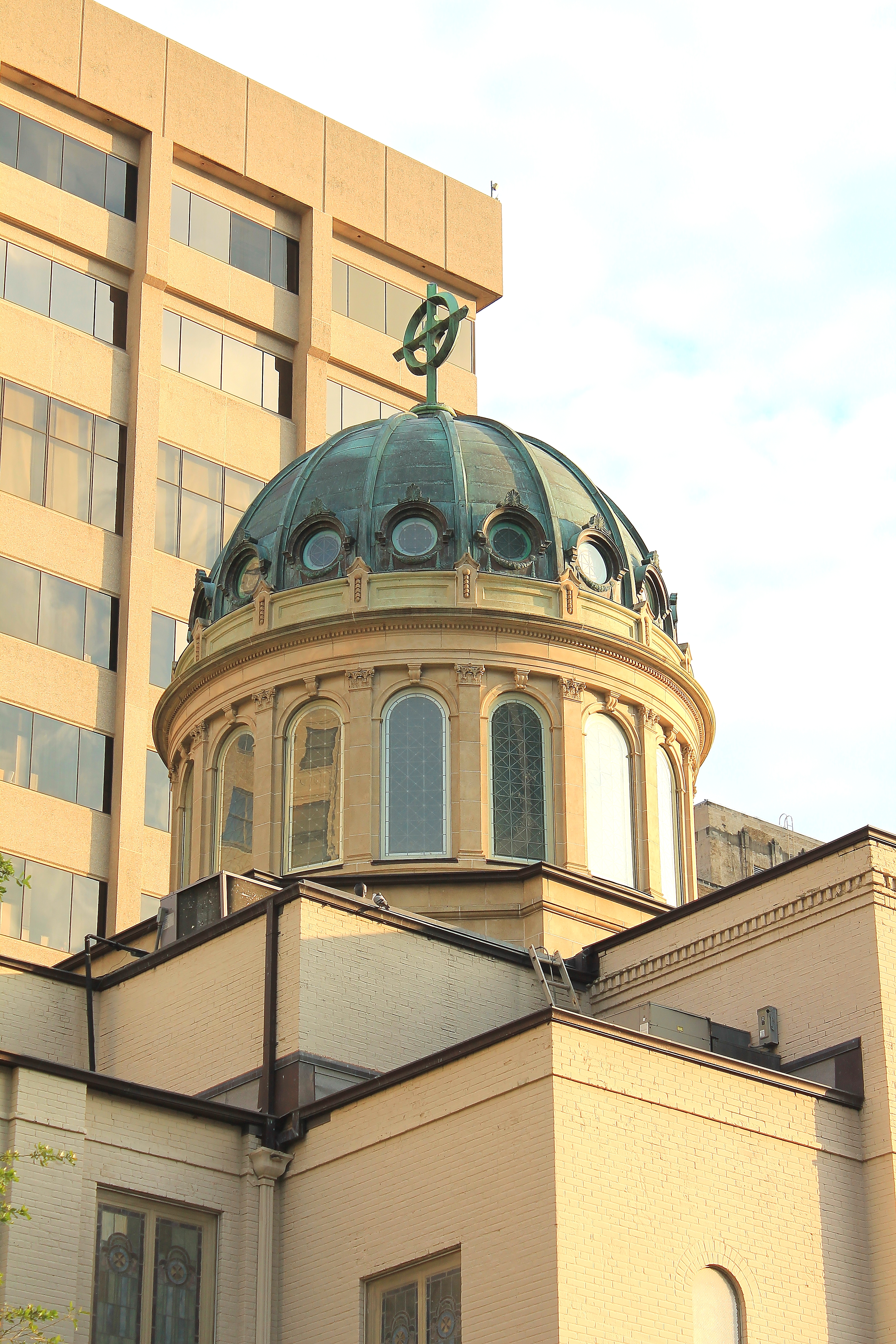

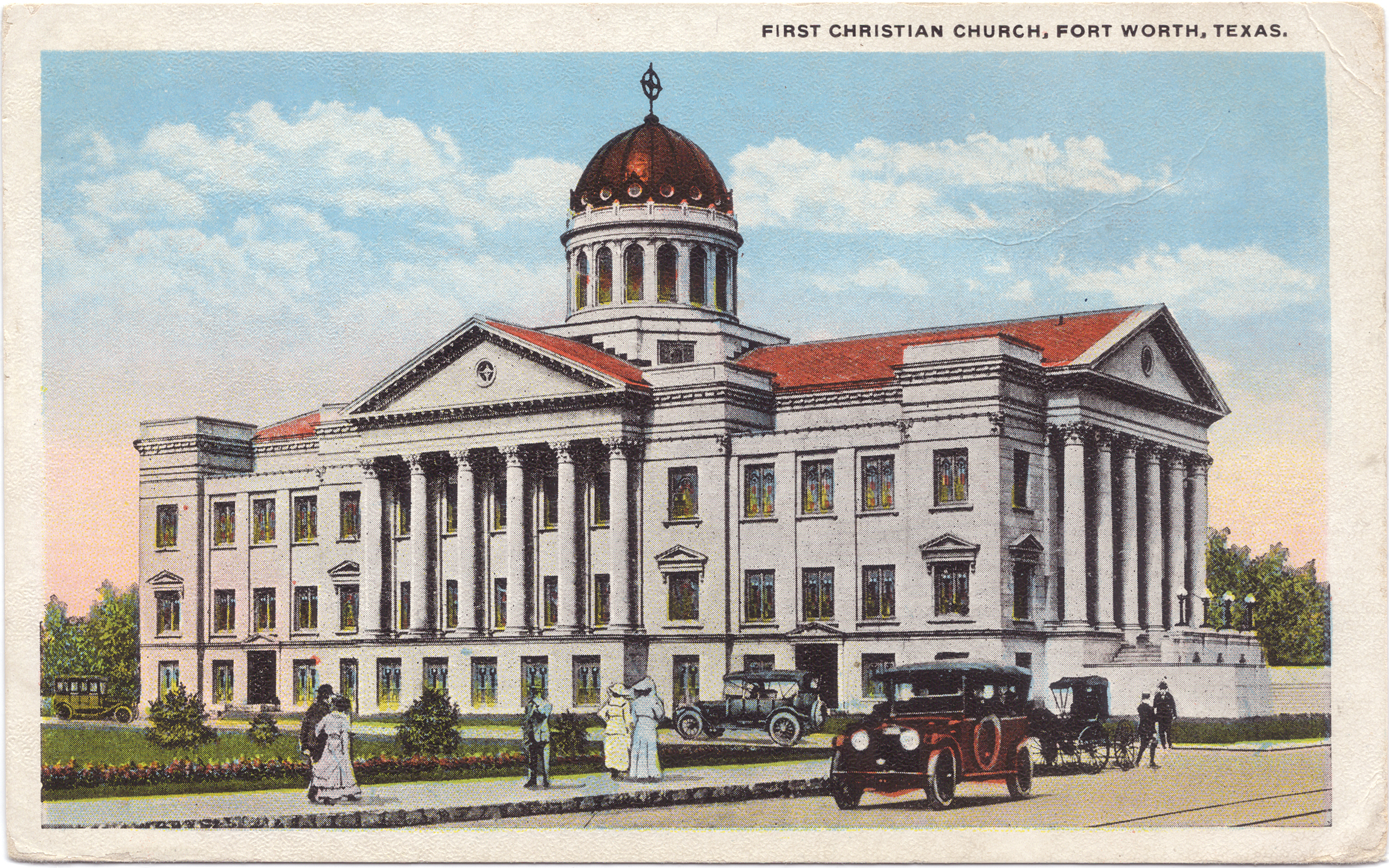
Undated postcard of First Christian Church

== See also ==
- National Register of Historic Places listings in Tarrant County, Texas
