= Timeline of Tyler, Texas =

The following is a timeline of the history of the city of Tyler, Texas, USA.

== 19th century ==
- 1846 – Tyler founded as seat of newly created Smith County.
- 1848
  - William Bartlett elected mayor.
  - First Baptist Church founded.
- 1850
  - Town of Tyler incorporated.
  - Population: 1,024 (estimate).
- 1851 – Tyler Telegraph newspaper begins publication.
- 1863 – Camp Ford Confederate-run prisoner of war camp begins operating near town during the American Civil War.
- 1870 – Bonner and Williams Bank in business.
- 1871 – Bowdoin Literary Society founded.
- 1874 – Houston & Great Northern Railroad begins operating.
- 1877 – Tyler Tap Railroad built.
- 1882 – "Public school system" organized.
- 1888 – Tyler Electric Light and Power Co. in operation.
- 1889 – Temple Beth El (synagogue) built.
- 1890 – Population: 6,908.
- 1894 – Texas College founded.
- 1895
  - Robert Henson Hillard (4 March 1869 – 29 October 1895), accused of raping and murdering 23-year-old Rebecca Bell (née Rebecca Kinsey; 1872–1895), wife of Leonard Bell (1870–1900), was lynched – burned alive for 50 minutes – while 7,000 to 12,000 spectators watched; he was initially identified as Jim King
  - Colored Methodist Episcopal church established.
- 1898
  - Daily Courier newspaper in publication.
  - Texas Federation of Women's Literary Clubs conference held in Tyler.
- 1900 – Population: 8,069.

== 20th century ==
- 1904 – Carnegie Public Library of Tyler opens.
- 1907 – City of Tyler incorporated.
- 1909 – Smith County Courthouse built.
- 1910 – Population: 10,400.
- 1915 – "Manager-commission form of government" adopted.
- 1916 – East Texas Fair begins.
- 1918 – Chamber of Commerce incorporated.
- 1926 – Tyler Junior College founded.
- 1929 – Tyler Morning Telegraph newspaper begins publication.
- 1930
  - East Texas Oil Field discovered in vicinity of Tyler; oil boom begins.
  - Liberty Theatre in business.
  - Population: 17,113.
- 1931 – KGKB radio begins broadcasting.
- 1933 – Texas Rose Festival begins.
- 1935 – Bergfeld Park amphitheater built.
- 1936 – Tyler Symphony Orchestra established.
- 1938 – Tyler City Hall built.
- 1940 – Tyler Theater built (approximate date).
- 1943 – U.S. military Camp Fannin begins operating near city during World War II.
- 1950 – Population: 38,968.
- 1952 – Tyler Municipal Rose Garden opens.
- 1953 – Caldwell Zoo established.
- 1954
  - Smith County Courthouse rebuilt.
  - KLTV (television) begins broadcasting.
- 1955 – Green Acres Baptist Church (later megachurch) established.
- 1959 – Smith County Historical Society founded.
- 1971 – University of Texas at Tyler established.
- 1975 – Broadway Square Mall in business.
- 1980 – Population: 70,508.
- 1986 – Roman Catholic Diocese of Tyler established.
- 1988 – East Texas Islamic Society founded.
- 1996 – City website online (approximate date).

== 21st century ==
- 2005 – Louie Gohmert becomes U.S. representative for Texas's 1st congressional district.
- 2007 – Sky Vue Drive-In cinema in business.
- 2010 – Population: 96,900.
- 2011 – Liberty Hall opens.
- 2014 – Martin Heines becomes mayor.
- 2016 – Historic preservation city planning begins.
- 2022 - Robert E. Lee High School and John Tyler High School renamed to Tyler Legacy High School and Tyler High School, respectively

== See also ==
- List of mayors of Tyler, Texas
- Smith County history
- National Register of Historic Places listings in Smith County, Texas

== Bibliography ==
1. "Tyler". Texas State Gazetteer and Business Directory. St. Louis: R.L. Polk & Co. 1884.
2. "Tyler". Texas State Gazetteer and Business Directory. Detroit: R.L. Polk & Co. 1890.
3. "Tyler" . Encyclopædia Britannica. Vol. 27 (11th ed.). 1910. p. 496.
4. "Tyler". Texas State Gazetteer and Business Directory. Detroit: R.L. Polk & Co. 1914.
5. Federal Writers' Project (1940), "Tyler", Texas: a Guide to the Lone Star State, American Guide Series, New York: Hastings House, pp. 404–405, hdl:2027/mdp.39015002677667 – via HathiTrust
6. Gladys Peters Austin, Along the Century Trail: Early History of Tyler, Texas (Dallas: Avalon Press, 1946).
7. Albert Woldert (1948). History of Tyler and Smith County. San Antonio: Naylor – via University of North Texas Libraries.
8. Chronicles Of Smith County, Texas, Tyler: Smith County Historical Society. 1962- (Index)
9. Robert W. Glover; Linda Brown Cross, eds. (1976). Tyler & Smith County, Texas: An Historical Survey. American Bicentennial Committee of Tyler-Smith County – via University of North Texas Libraries.
10. Donald W. Whisenhunt, comp., Chronological History of Smith County (Tyler, Texas: Smith County Historical Society, 1983).
11. Paul T. Hellmann (2006). "Texas: Tyler". Historical Gazetteer of the United States. Taylor & Francis. ISBN 1-135-94859-3.
12. Archie P. McDonald (2006). Historic Smith County: An Illustrated History of Tyler & Smith County. San Antonio: Historical Publishing Network. ISBN 978-1-893619-66-1.
13. Robert E. Reed Jr. (2008). Tyler. Images of America. Charleston, SC: Arcadia. ISBN 9780738548418.
