= Barbara Bass =

American politician

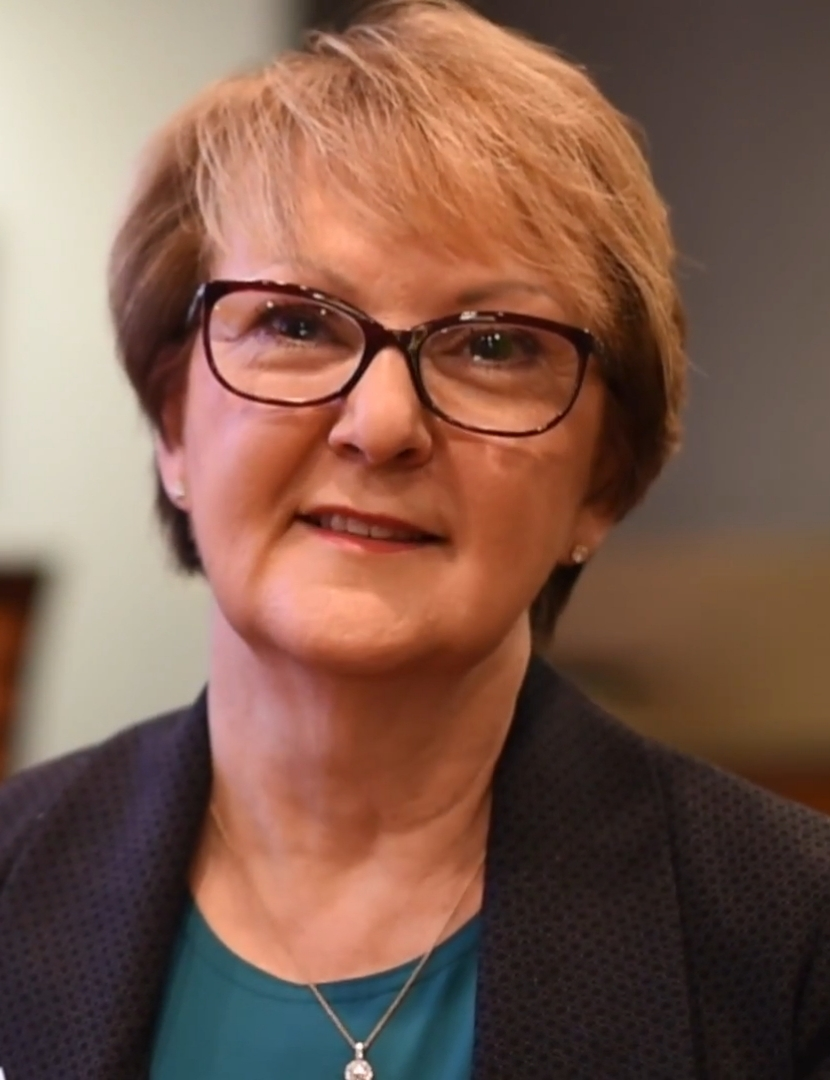

Mayor of Tyler, Texas
- In office May 2008 – May 2014
- Preceded by: Joey Seeber
- Succeeded by: Martin Heines

Personal details
- Born: Barbara Reid Bass; January 29, 1954 (age 72)
- Party: Republican
- Spouse: Billy H. Bass (m. 1977)
- Education: Texas A&M University at Commerce
- Occupation: Certified Public Accountant

Barbara Reid Bass (born January 29, 1954) is the former mayor of Tyler, Texas. First elected in May 2008, she won re-election in 2010 and 2012. She left office in 2014 because of term limits and was succeeded by Martin Heines, a real estate businessman.

== Service ==
Bass has served as chair of the Better Business Bureau of Central East Texas, and the Tyler Area Chamber of Commerce, the Tyler Economic Development Council. Bass also served as chairman of the Hospice of East Texas and as treasurer of the East Texas Symphony Orchestra Association. For two decades, she has served on the Texas Society of CPAs, including three terms on the executive board. She was a Leadership Tyler Class I participant. To succeed Mayor Joey Seeber, Bass defeated Laura Corbett in 2008 to become Tyler's first female mayor.

She donated money to Louie Gohmert.

== Personal life ==
Bass is a native East Texan and moved to Tyler with her husband, Billy, in 1977. She is a partner in the CPA firm, Gollob Morgan Peddy PC. She is the treasurer of Pollard United Methodist Church.

Political offices
Preceded by Joey Seeber	Mayor of Tyler; 2008–2014	Succeeded by Martin Heines
