= Christus Trinity Mother Frances Health System =

Non-profit health care provider in Texas, US

- Company type: Private
- Industry: Health care
- Founded: 1937; 89 years ago, in Tyler, Texas, United States
- Headquarters: Tyler, Texas, U.S.
- Number of employees: 4,400+
- Website: www.christustmf.org

Christus Trinity Mother Frances Health System is a non-profit regional health care provider based in Tyler, Texas, United States, that operates eight hospitals and 82 clinic locations in East Texas.

== History ==
In the early 1930s, the Sisters of The Holy Family of Nazareth came to Tyler, Texas, from the Sacred Heart Province in Chicago to open Mother Frances Hospital. The hospital was named in honor of Frances Siedliska, the founder of the Sisters of the Holy Family of Nazareth. The hospital opened on March 18, 1937 – one day ahead of schedule – to provide care for victims of the New London School explosion.

In 1948, the Sisters of the Holy Family of Nazareth completed the purchase of the hospital from the City of Tyler and in October 1965, Mother Frances Week was celebrated in Tyler, dedicating a new 140,000-square-foot (13,000 m^{2}) wing. This $4.5 million wing added 110 new patient beds and a new cafeteria to the hospital.

In 1934, The Trinity Clinic began as The Bryant Clinic. It was founded by Dr. William Howard Bryant and Dr. Sidney W. Bradford. The Bryant Clinic received the first call for help in Tyler to treat the victims of the New London School explosion. In 1948, The Bryant Clinic changed its name to The Medical & Surgical Clinic and later, with the addition of two other Tyler-area medical practices, became Trinity Clinic. Today, Trinity Clinic is the area's largest multi-specialty medical group, with over 300 providers representing 38 specialties in 36 clinic locations in East Texas.

In 1994, Mother Frances Hospital and Trinity Clinic merged, creating Trinity Mother Frances Health System, one of the first integrated healthcare systems in the United States. In 2007, Trinity Mother Frances Health System changed its name to Trinity Mother Frances Hospitals and Clinics.

In May 2016, Trinity Mother Frances Hospitals and Clinics merged with Christus Health to create Christus Trinity Mother Frances Health System and Christus Trinity Clinic.

In June 2016, Christus Health and Hopkins County Memorial Hospital in Sulphur Springs, Texas, finalized an agreement to create Christus Hopkins Health Alliance and make Hopkins County Memorial Hospital a part of Christus Trinity Mother Frances Health System. The agreement included a change of name for the hospital to Christus Mother Frances Hospital - Sulphur Springs and its clinics to Christus Trinity Clinic - Sulphur Springs and Christus Trinity Clinic - Emory.

In July 2017, Magnolia Health Systems - Physicians of East Texas (MHS) became a part of Christus Trinity Mother Frances. This includes clinic locations in Palestine, Elkhart, Fairfield, Grapeland, and Buffalo, Texas.

In August 2017, Christus Trinity Clinic - Crockett opened as a family medicine clinic in Crockett, Texas.

== Reputation ==
The system has picked up a number of national awards for health care, including designations as a "100 Top Hospital" by Truven Health Analytics (2017); ranked the No. 1 hospital in Texas for Patient Safety in Overall Hospital and Surgical Care by CareChex (2016); National Benchmarks for Success award winner by Soluticient 2006; winner of the 2007 Texas Health Care Quality Improvement Award; designated as a Blue Cross and Blue Shield Distinction Center+ for Cardiac Care, Bariatric Surgery, Spine Surgery and Knee and Hip Replacement Services; National Research Corporation Consumer Choice winner; and listed among the top five percent in the nation for patient satisfaction by Press Ganey, Inc.
