= Don Warren (politician) =

American businessman and mayor

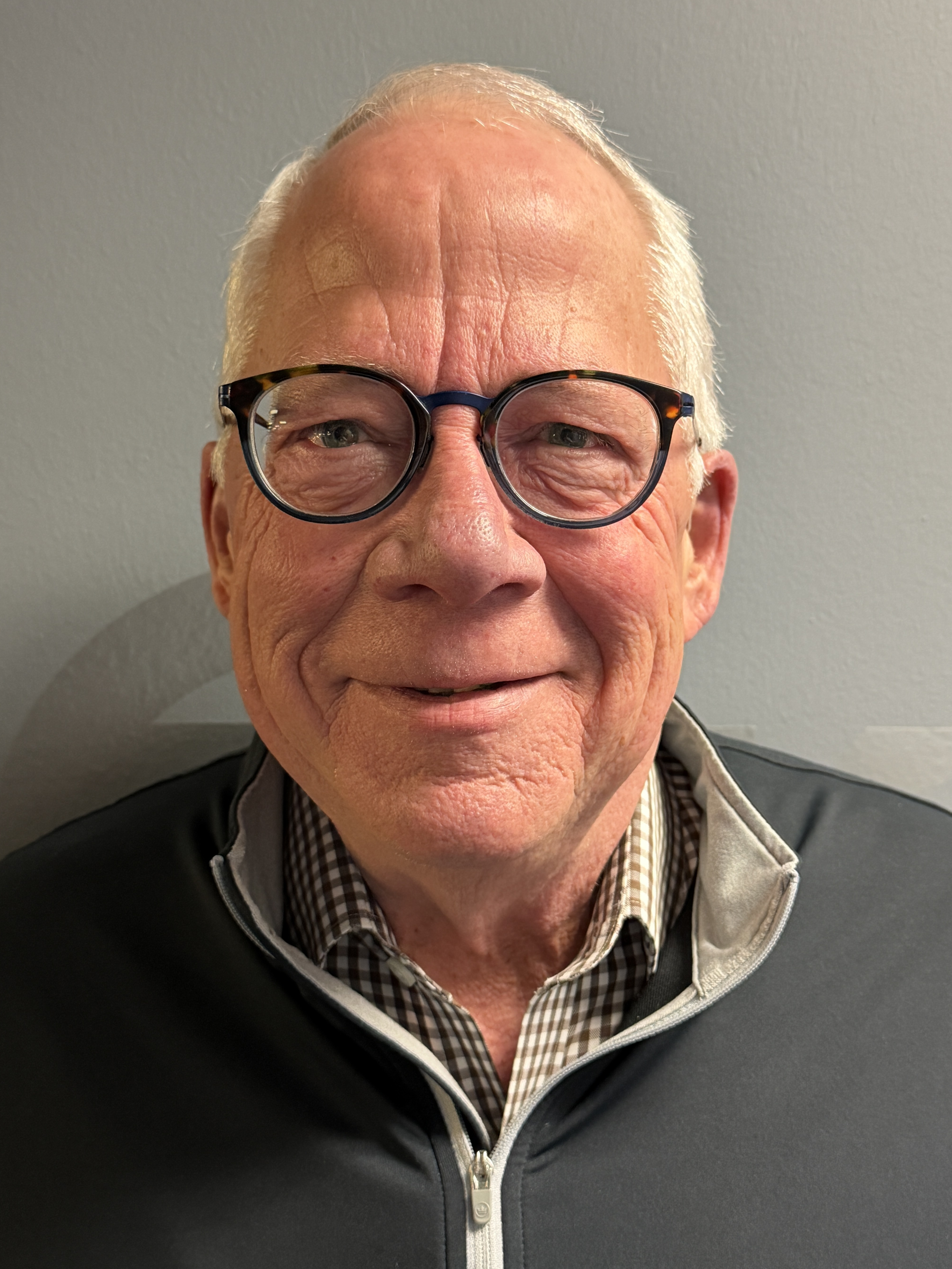

Mayor of Tyler
- Incumbent
- Assumed office November 11, 2020
- Preceded by: Martin Heines

Member of the Tyler City Council from the 4th district
- In office May 2014 – November 11, 2020
- Preceded by: Martin Heines
- Succeeded by: James Wynne

Personal details
- Born: Tyler, Texas, U.S.
- Party: Republican
- Spouse: Chelli
- Children: 2
- Education: Texas Tech University

Donald P. Warren is an American businessman who is the current mayor and a former city councilor in Tyler, Texas. He started his political career representing Tyler City Council district 4. He was elected on November 3, 2020 to be the mayor of Tyler, defeating challenger Joel Rando with 70% of the votes cast. He was sworn in on November 11, 2020.

== Political career ==
Between 2014 and 2019, Warren has donated $1,500 to Republican congressman Louie Gohmert. Additionally, he donated $250 to Republican Tom Leppert.

=== City government ===
On May 10, 2014 Warren was elected to represent district 4 of the Tyler City Council succeeding Martin Heines. He served the seat for 3 terms until being succeeded on November 11, 2020 by James Wynne.

In May 2019, Warren announced he would be a candidate in the 2020 Tyler mayoral election. His main challenger was identified as former city councilor John Nix. Between March 11 and June 30, 2020 Warren's campaign raised $45,781 compared to Nix's $2,750. However, in October 2020 John Nix suspended his campaign citing personal business issues. Warren would go on to win the general election on November 3, 2020 against challenger Joel Rando, the margin was 70% to 30%. He was sworn in on November 11, 2020 succeeding Martin Heines.

== Personal life ==
Donald P. Warren was born in Tyler, Texas and is a graduate of Robert E. Lee High School (now Tyler Legacy High School), and went on to attend Texas Tech University. He is married to his wife Chelli with whom he has 2 grown children, and he has 6 grandchildren. He and his wife attend Green Acres Baptist Church. Additionally, Warren enjoys golfing, traveling, and cooking.

Warren has been in the oil and gas industry for over 36 years. In 1994, he formed Lomoco, Inc., which is a gas and oil assets management company.

Political offices
Preceded by Martin Heines	Mayor of Tyler; 2020 — present	Succeeded by Incumbent
Preceded by Martin Heines	Tyler City Council district 4; 2014 – 2020	Succeeded by James Wynne
