= Texas Rose Festival =

Annual rose-growing festival

Coordinates: 32.3454°N 95.3214°W

The Texas Rose Festival, a three-day event held annually in Tyler, Texas, celebrates the role of the rose-growing industry in the local economy. The festivities, taking place during the third weekend of October, draw thousands of tourists to the city each year.

== History ==
The first Tyler Rose Festival was organized by Tyler Garden Club members, local rose growers and the Chamber of Commerce in October 1933 for the purpose of focusing attention on the importance of the rose industry to Tyler, and to showcase the town's elegance; it was renamed the Texas Rose Festival during the Texas Centennial in 1936. Aside from the festival's suspension during World War II and in 2020, it has been an annual event.

== The Rose Queen and her court ==
Many of the festival's events center on the Rose Queen and her court, who wear lavish gowns and costumes that are often in keeping with the theme of the year's festival. These participants generally come from wealthy backgrounds and often have long family histories with the festival; many have played various roles in the events since childhood. The queen and her court are chosen by the President of the Texas Rose Festival Association who works in the organization for four years before taking on the role as president.

In addition to the Rose Queen, the court includes:

- The Duchess of the Rose Growers, a member of a rose-growing family selected by and representing the Texas Rose Growers Association.
- Out-of-town duchesses and escorts, sponsored by a family involved in the Rose Festival and invited because of relationships with Tyler residents.
- Ladies in waiting, a select group of young women from Tyler, in their sophomore year of college, whose families have been involved in the festival for several years.
- Train bearers, scepter bearers and attendants to the queen, usually elementary-school-aged children whose families are involved in the festival.

Rose Queens include:

- 2026 Claire Ann Malone
- 2025 Avery Craft Armstrong
- 2024 Frances Olivia Faulconer
- 2023 Laura Elaine Bryan
- 2022 Molly Louise Berry
- 2021 Anna Grace Hallmark
- 2019 Hanna Claire Waits
- 2018 Amanda Elaine Hiles
- 2017 Emily Kaye Evans
- 2016 Mallory Kristine Curtis
- 2015 Madeline Shirley Wynne
- 2014 Kathryn Elizabeth Peltier
- 2013 Rachel Vanderpool Clyde
- 2012 Haley McGrede Anderson
- 2011 Morgan Elizabeth Rippy
- 2010 Mary-Lawson Bracken Walden
- 2009 Emily Anne Austin
- 2008 Sarah Elizabeth Clyde
- 2007 Grace Hartley Ramey (Cryer)
- 2006 Lauren Frances Jones (Stoltz)
- 2005 Katherine Noel King (Gibson)
- 2004 Lauren French Sanford
- 2003 Elizabeth Arlene Lilly
- 2002 Audrey Elizabeth Bell (Mazzu)
- 2001 Martha Claire Woldert
- 2000 Caroline Malone Key
- 1999 Joan Lindsay Burroughs (Woldert)
- 1998 Meridith Leigh Patterson (Hayes)
- 1997 Elizabeth Marsh Smith (Ortega)
- 1996 Anna Elizabeth Clyde (Malone)
- 1995 Martha Lindsey Wolf
- 1994 Michael Katherine McArthur
- 1993 Erin Elizabeth Simpson
- 1992 Kristie Leigh Hardin
- 1991 Ashley Jean Powell (Sutton)
- 1990 Katherine Claire Duncan
- 1989 Samantha Price Fischer (Skaran, McPherson, Kyle)
- 1988 Lora Elizabeth Clyde (Arnold)
- 1987 Allyson Anne Henry (Sullivan)
- 1986 Marla Kathryn Hughes (Reeder)
- 1985 Mollie Bess Arnold (Winston)
- 1984 Diana Patricia Taylor (McMillan)
- 1983 Jane Alice Boyd Hartley (Coker)
- 1982 Jamie Clara Arnold (Landes)
- 1981 Kay Elizabeth Fair
- 1980 Alicia Staley Wynne (Gray)
- 1979 Claire Martin Ramey (Turner)
- 1978 Virginia Rice Fair (Gowin)
- 1977 Amy Jane Lawrence (Walton)
- 1976 Hollee Susann Hedge (Clawater)
- 1975 Nanette Oge (West)
- 1974 Eloise Clyde (Chandler)
- 1973 Amanda Warner (Jackson)
- 1972 Cynthia Eileen Stringer (Martin)
- 1971 Mary Martha Fair
- 1970 Melinda Riter (Shoemake)
- 1969 Eugenia Key (Son)
- 1968 Louise Grelling Spence (Griffeth)
- 1967 Katherine Clyde (Ramsey)
- 1966 Lynn Clawater (Staley)
- 1965 Elaine McKay (Harman)
- 1964 Carolyn Louise Shaw
- 1963 Lometa Hudnall
- 1962 Harriet Sue Caldwell (McArthur)
- 1961 Lousanne Orr Wise (Yandell)
- 1960 Carol Joan Dean (Wade)
- 1959 Elizabeth Byars (Summers; daughter of Billy Byars Sr.)
- 1958 Patricia Lewis (Chambers)
- 1957 Kay Howard (Garland)
- 1956 Gail Hudson (White)
- 1955 Maymerle Shirley (Brown)
- 1954 Joanne Miller (Glass)
- 1953 Sally Kay
- 1952 Carol Ellison (Stollenwerck)
- 1951 Catherine Roberts
- 1950 Laura Jill King (Ramey)
- 1949 Rose Marie Young (Reynolds)
- 1948 Mary Anne Nenney (McCain)
- 1947 Carolyn Riviere (McArthur)
- 1941 Elizabeth Calhoun (Bobbitt)
- 1940 Mary John Grelling (Spence)
- 1939 Dorothy Bell (Finn)
- 1938 Frances Connally
- 1937 Katherine Booty
- 1936 Gertrude Ann Windsor (Richardson)
- 1935 Margaret Hunt Hill
- 1934 Louise Boren
- 1933, the 1st Rose Queen, Margaret Copeland (Donoghue) from Palestine, Texas

== Rose Festival events ==
Rose Festival events open to the public generally include:

- A Vespers service, held at the home church of the reigning Rose Queen
- The Queen's Tea, during which the public is invited to meet the Rose Queen and her court at the Tyler Municipal Rose Garden
- A Men's Luncheon and a Ladies' Luncheon, featuring guest speakers
- Queen's Coronation ceremonies
- The Rose Festival Parade, featuring floats, bands and community organizations
- A Rose Show and gardening seminars
- The Rose Festival Arts and Crafts Show at the Tyler Municipal Rose Garden

Other events held in conjunction with the festival have included an art show, a car show, doll, bear and toy shows, an arts and crafts fair, and symphony concerts in the park.

The Rose Festival Parade takes place on Saturday morning and concludes at CHRISTUS Trinity Mother Frances Rose Stadium. Parade entries include floats carrying the Rose Queen and members of her court, marching bands, color guards, dance teams, automobile and equestrian groups, Shriners, local dignitaries and other community organizations. Members of the Queen's court ride on floats associated with their presentation groups, while the Queen appears on a separate float. The parade entries make a final circuit inside Rose Stadium before the parade concludes.

The parade is organized by the Strutters Executive Board, which coordinates parade entries, staging, judging, safety requirements and other logistical arrangements.

A number of private parties also coincide with the festival, including the Queen's Coronation Ball, hosted by the Order of the Rose. On the final night of the festival, the families and friends of the participants watch as each member of the court is formally presented. Participants from Tyler, Texas, traditionally wear white ball gowns, while participants from outside the city wear jewel-colored gowns. The Rose Queen is the final member of the court to be presented. The presentation is followed by a celebration with music and dancing.

== See also ==
- List of festivals in the United States
- List of museums in East Texas
