= Martin Heines =

American politician (born 1962)

Mayor of Tyler
- In office May 21, 2014 – November 11, 2020
- Preceded by: Barbara Bass
- Succeeded by: Don Warren

Member of the Tyler City Council from the 4th district
- In office 2010 – May 2014
- Succeeded by: Don Warren

Personal details
- Born: 1962 (age 63–64) Tyler, Texas, U.S.
- Party: Democratic
- Spouse: Michelle
- Children: 2
- Education: University of Texas at Austin (BBA)

Martin J. Heines (born 1962) is the former mayor of Tyler, Texas. First elected in May 2014, he won re-election in 2016 and 2018, serving three terms as mayor. Heines succeeded three term Mayor Barbra Bass, to become mayor in 2014. He was succeeded in 2020 by Don Warren. Heines is a small business owner as well as a property manager and investor. He holds a bachelor's of arts degree in business administration from the University of Texas at Austin.

== Personal life ==
Martin J. Heines was born in 1962 in Tyler, Texas. He is married to his wife Michelle, and they have 2 children. They attend the Cathedral of the Immaculate Conception. In 1985, Heines graduated from University of Texas at Austin with a BBA.

== Political career ==
Heines served on the Tyler City Council District 4 for 2 terms between 2010 and 2014, and was succeeded by Don Warren. While serving on the council, he was a member of the Council Audit Committee and the Council Building/Economic Development Committee. He also served as mayor protempore. Heines was sworn in as the mayor of Tyler in May 2014 succeeding Barbara Bass. Heines is the previous chairman of the Smith County Democratic Party.

Heines, who was term limited, was succeeded by Don Warren on November 11, 2020.

While Heines was the former chairman of the Smith County Democratic Party, he has made numerous donations to candidates for the Republican Party. His donations include to Mitt Romney, Jason Wright, and Rick Perry. However, he has also donated to Democratic presidential candidate Wesley Clark. Heines earlier donations were to Democratic candidates, but his newer ones are to Republicans.

Political offices
Preceded by Barbara Bass	Mayor of Tyler; 2014 – 2020	Succeeded by Don Warren
Preceded by	Tyler City Council district 4; 2010 – 2014	Succeeded by Don Warren
