= Rose Garden Center (Tyler, Texas) =

- Tyler Municipal Rose Garden
- U.S. National Register of Historic Places
- Tyler Rose Garden Center
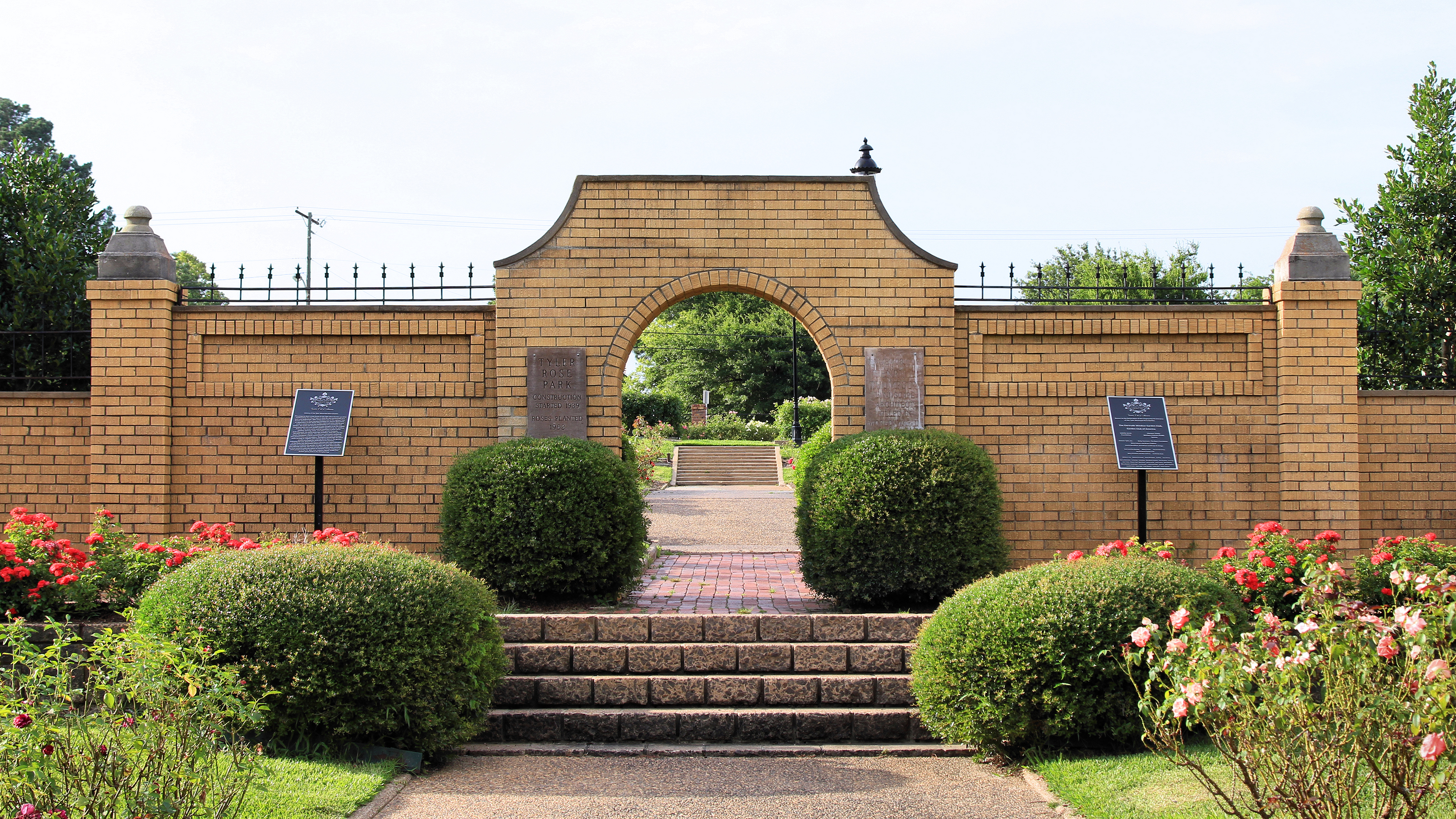

- Location within Texas Location within the United States
- Location: 420 Rose Park Drive, Tyler, Smith County, Texas, U.S.
- Coordinates: 32.345393°N 95.321371°W
- Area: 14 acres (5.7 ha)
- NRHP reference No.: 100003539
- Added to NRHP: March 22, 2019

The Rose Garden Center, or the Tyler Municipal Rose Garden, is a historic, municipal garden of roses in Tyler, Texas. It is the largest collection of roses in the United States. It is one of the largest tourist attractions in Tyler, it is the location of the Tyler Rose Museum, and is part of the annual Texas Rose Festival.

The Rose Garden Center is listed on the National Register of Historic Places since March 22, 2019, for its role in regional and state tourism.

== History ==
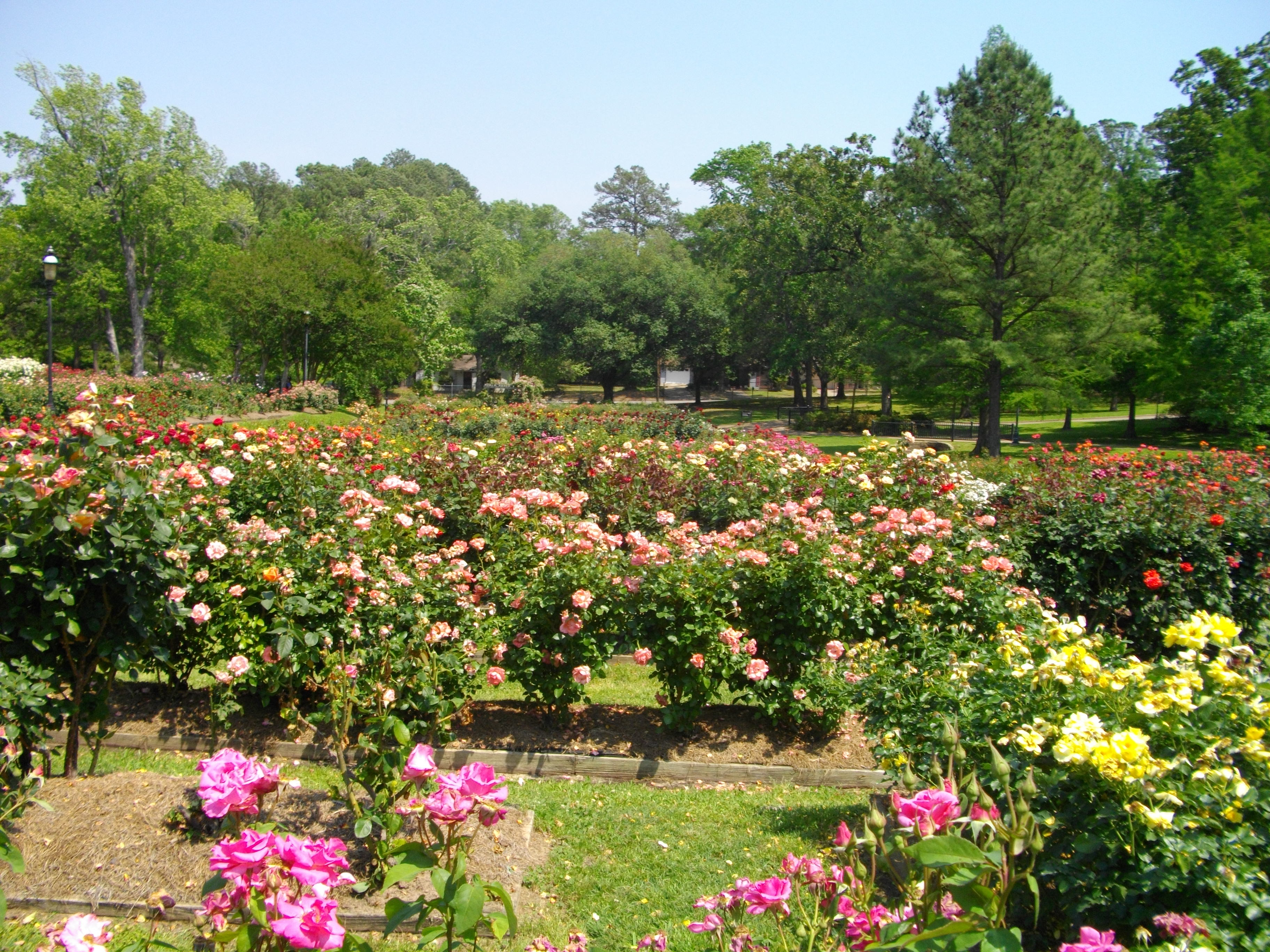
Rose Garden Center (March 2009) in Tyler, Texas

The Rose Garden Center was a 1938 Works Progress Administration (WPA) park project, and was mostly completed in 1941; but due to World War II, the center did not open to the public until 1952. In 1956, the lawn at the Rose Garden Center started hosting the Queen's Tea event, a part of the annual Texas Rose Festival. In 1992, they rebuilt the associated building and expanded its size, in order to home the Tyler Rose Museum.

It is a 14-acre (5.7 ha) rose garden with more than 38,000 bushes and at least 500 varieties, including 50 types of heritage roses. It is the largest public collection of roses in the United States. It is also an All-America Rose Selections (AARS) test garden.

It is one of the largest tourist attractions in Tyler, it is the location of the Tyler Rose Museum, and is part of the annual Texas Rose Festival in October. In 2022, the center added QR codes near the plants in order to facilitate the identification of rose varieties.

== See also ==
- National Register of Historic Places listings in Smith County, Texas
