= Tyler, Texas =

- City
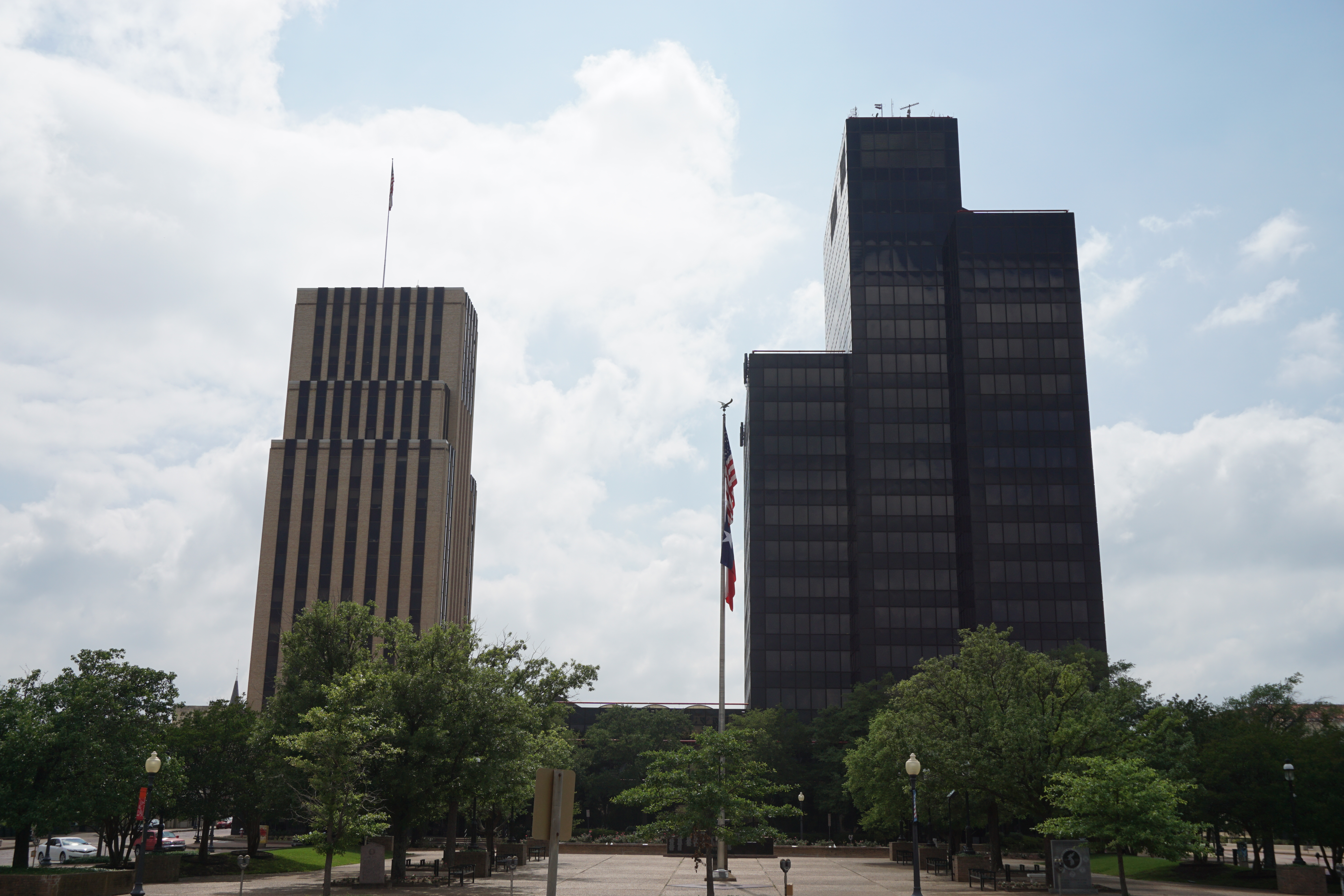
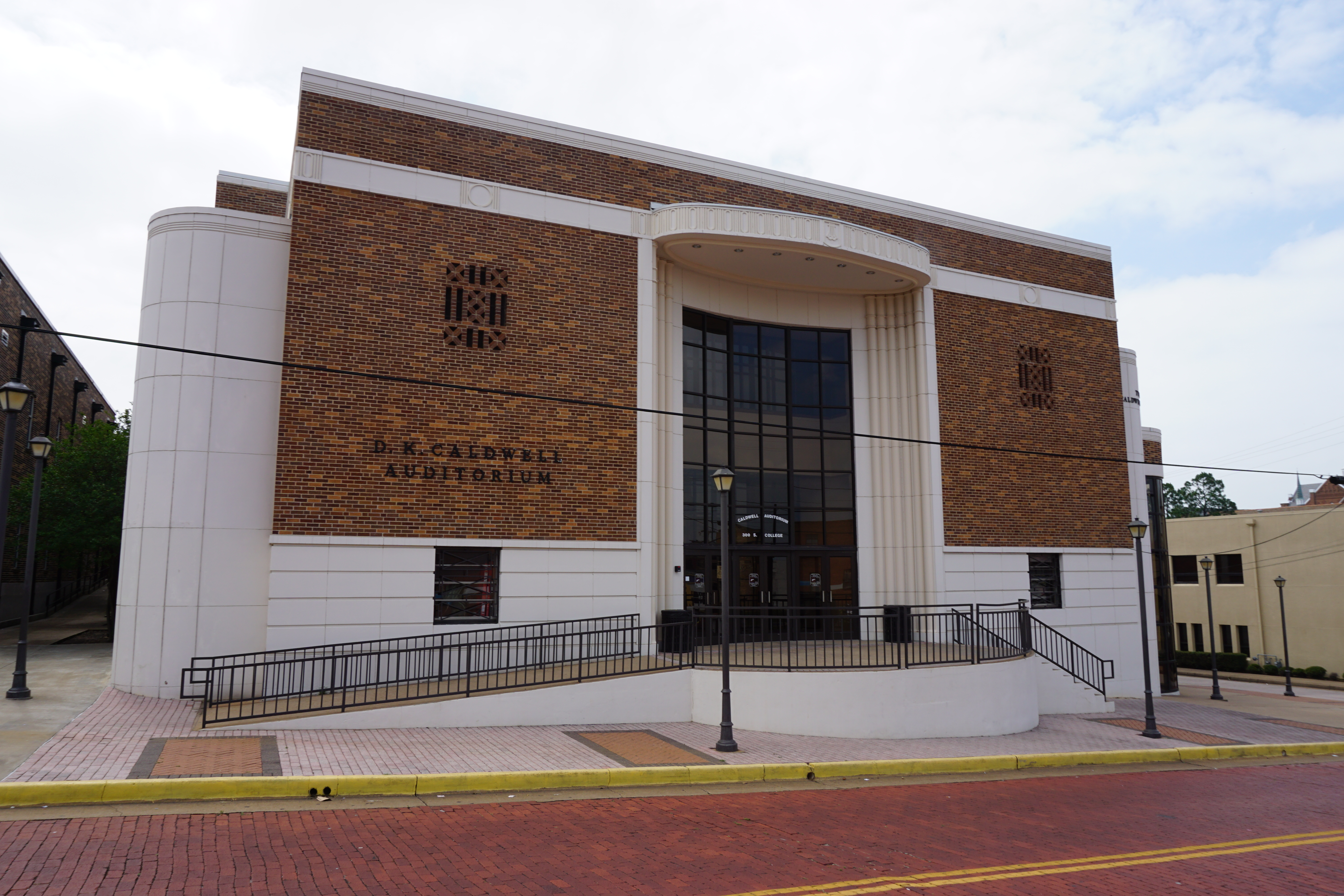
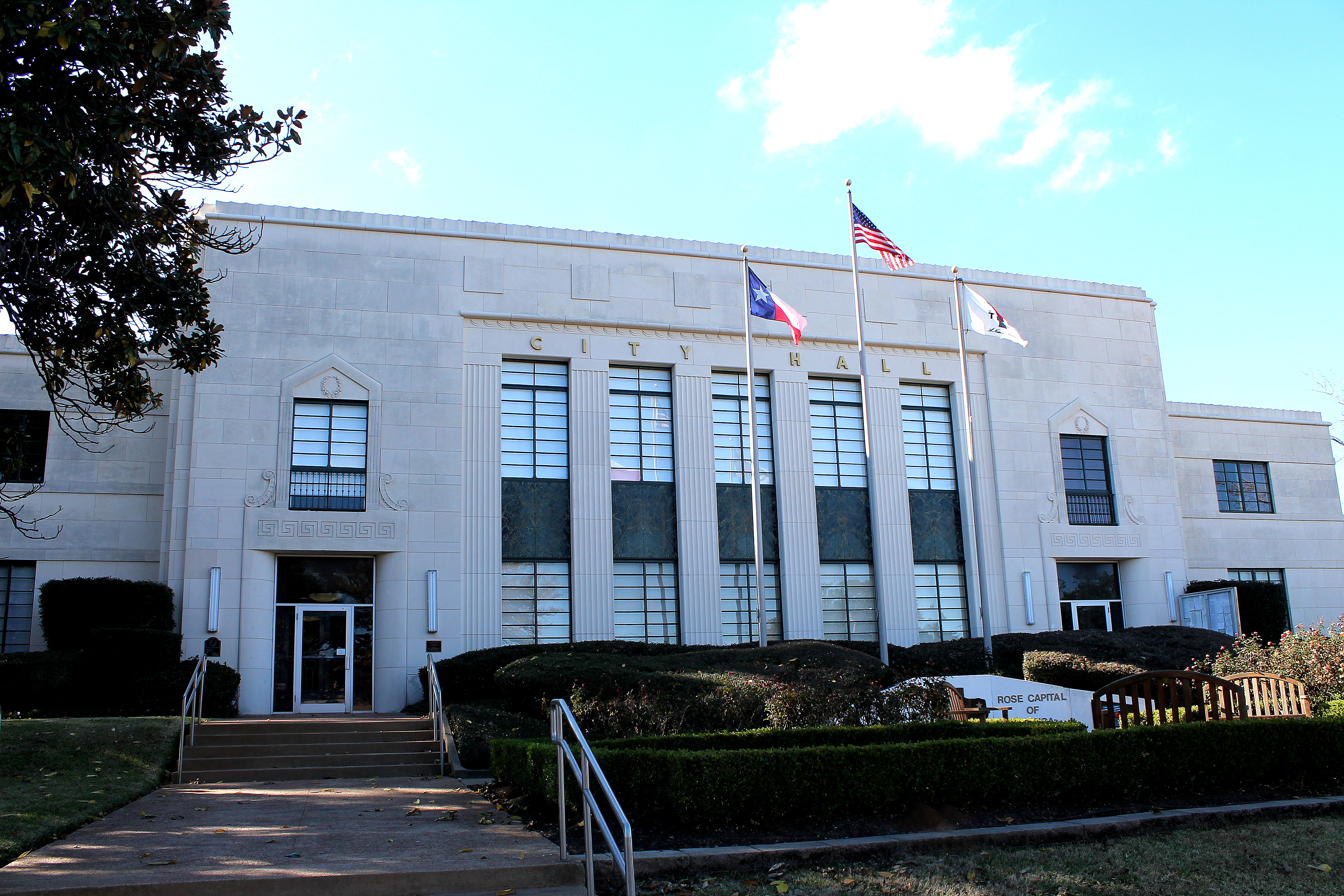
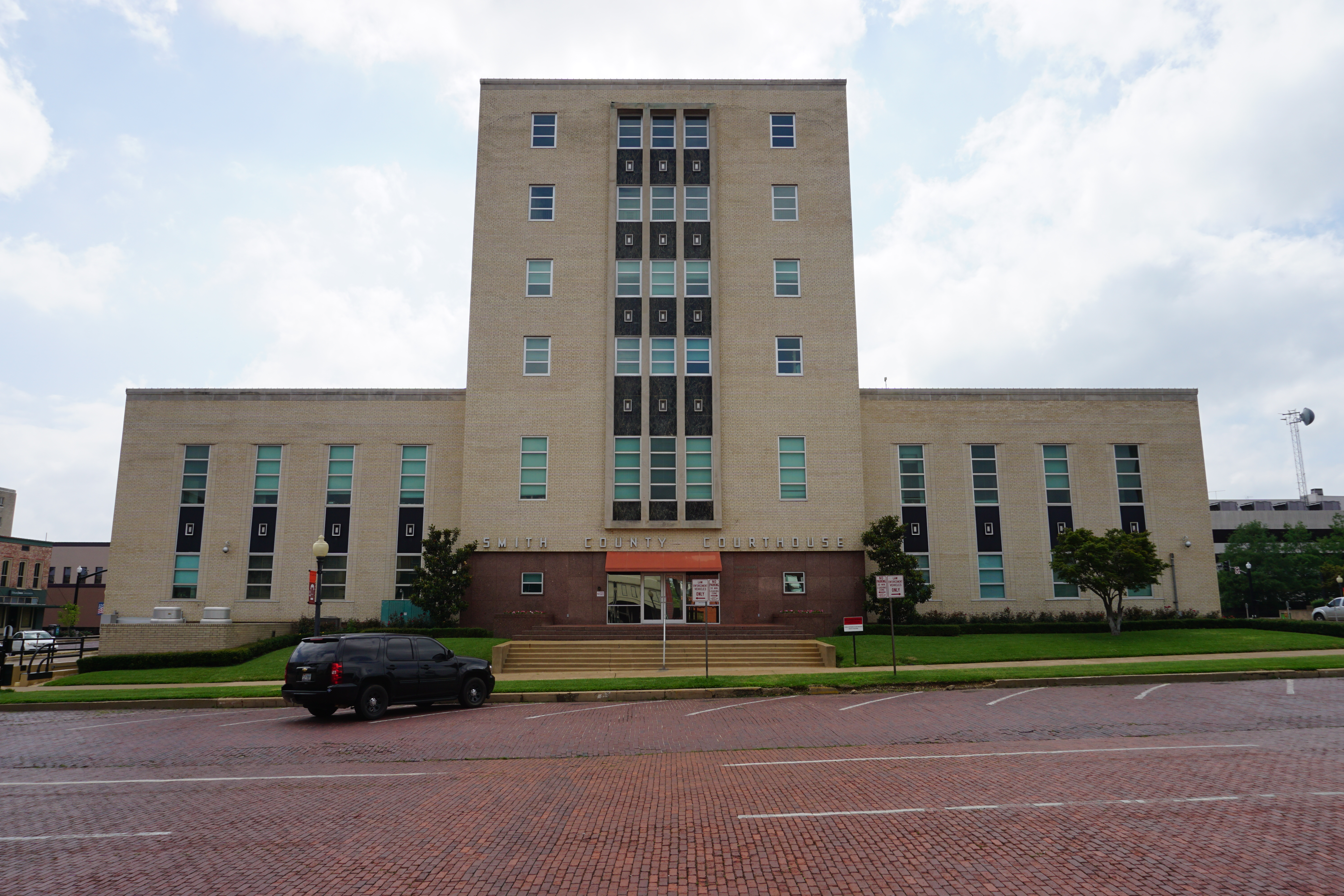
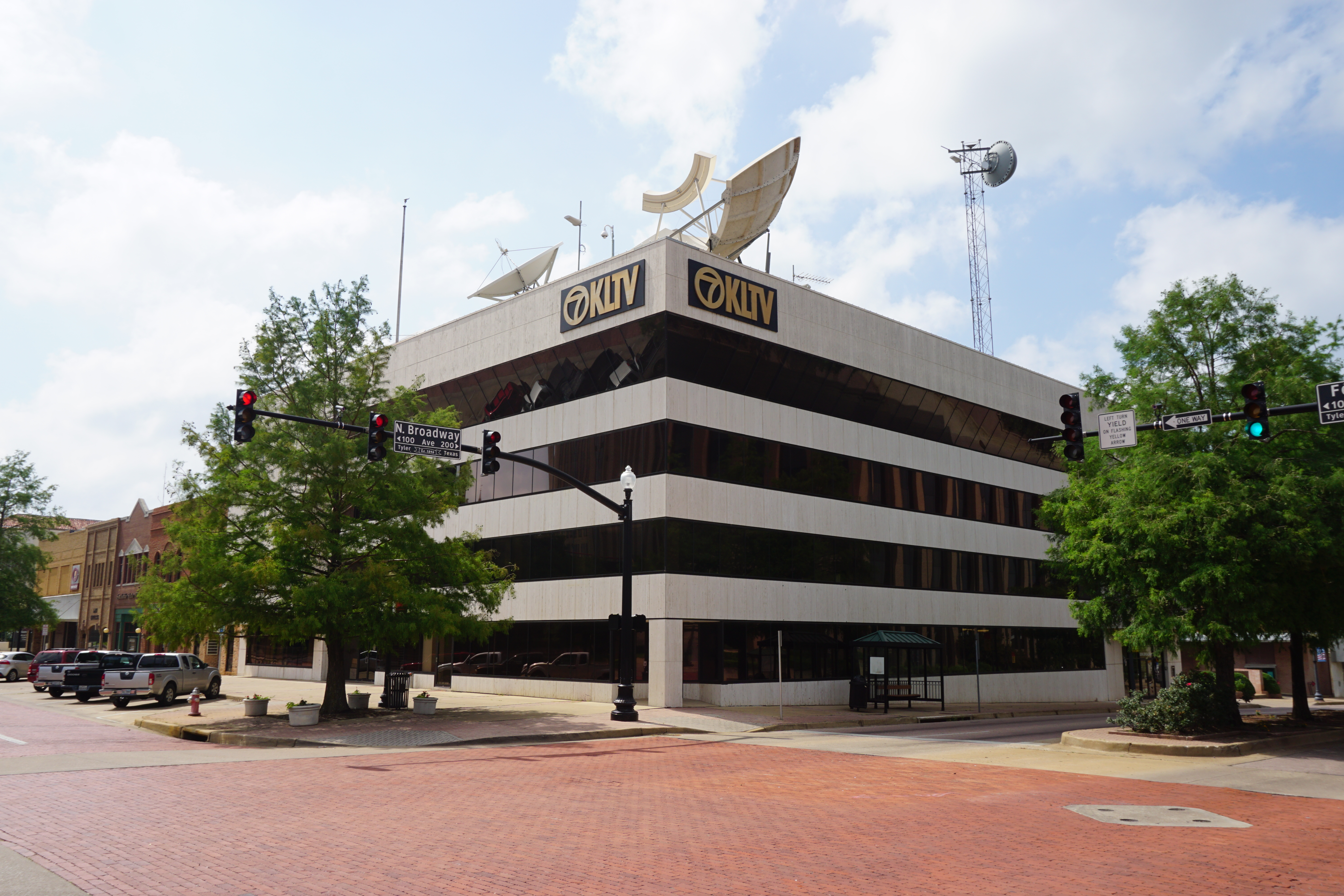
- Downtown Caldwell Auditorium City Hall Smith County Courthouse KLTV studios

- Seal
- Nicknames: Rose City, Rose Capital, Rose Capital of America
- Motto: A Natural Beauty
- Location in Smith County and Texas
- Coordinates: 32°21′05″N 95°18′04″W
- Country: United States
- State: Texas
- County: Smith
- Founded: April 11, 1846
- Incorporated: January 29, 1850
- Named for: John Tyler

Government
  - Type: Mayor–council government
  - Mayor: Stuart Hene

Area
  - City: 58.31 sq mi (151.02 km^{2})
  - Land: 57.79 sq mi (149.67 km^{2})
  - Water: 0.52 sq mi (1.34 km^{2})
- Elevation: 499 ft (152 m)

Population (2020)
  - City: 105,995
  - Estimate (2024): 112,219 ▲
  - Rank: US: 289th TX: 38th
  - Density: 1,891/sq mi (730.2/km^{2})
  - Urban: 131,028 (US: 258th)
  - Urban density: 1,607/sq mi (620.5/km^{2})
  - Metro: 241,922 (US: 198th)
  - Metro density: 263/sq mi (101.4/km^{2})
- Demonym: Tylerite
- Time zone: UTC–6 (Central (CST))
  - Summer (DST): UTC–5 (CDT)
- ZIP Codes: 75701-75709 75798-75799
- Area codes: 903 and 430
- FIPS code: 48-74144
- GNIS feature ID: 2412122
- Primary airport: Tyler Regional Airport
- Website: cityoftyler.org

Tyler is a city in and the county seat of Smith County, Texas, United States. As of 2020, the population is 105,995. Tyler is the 38th most populous city in Texas (as well as the most populous in Northeast Texas) and 289th in the United States. It is the principal city of the Tyler metropolitan statistical area, which is the 198th most populous metropolitan area in the U.S. and 16th in Texas after Waco and the College Station–Bryan areas, with a population of 233,479 in 2020. The city is named for John Tyler, the 10th President of the United States.

In 1985, the international Adopt-a-Highway movement began in Tyler. After appeals from local Texas Department of Transportation officials, the local Civitan International chapter adopted a two-mile (three kilometer) stretch of U.S. Route 69 to maintain. Drivers and other motorists traveling on this segment of U.S. 69 (between Tyler and nearby Lindale) will see brown road signs that read "First Adopt-A-Highway in the World".

Tyler is known as the "Rose Capital of America" (also the "Rose City" and the "Rose Capital of the World"), a nickname it earned from a long history of rose production, cultivation, and processing. It is home to the largest rose garden in the United States, a 14-acre public garden complex that has over 38,000 rose bushes of at least 500 different varieties. The Tyler Rose Garden Center is also home to the annual Texas Rose Festival which attracts thousands of tourists each October.

As Northeast Texas and Smith County's major economic, educational, financial, medical and cultural hub, Tyler is host to more than 20,000 higher-education students; the University of Texas at Tyler; a university health science center; and regional hospital systems. It is the headquarters for Brookshire Grocery Company and many other large employers. Tyler is also home to the Caldwell Zoo and Broadway Square Mall, and the seat of the Roman Catholic Diocese of Tyler and its Cathedral of the Immaculate Conception.

== History ==
=== Founding and Civil War (1846–1865) ===
Legal recognition of Tyler was initiated by an act of the state legislature on April 11, 1846. The Texas government created Smith County and authorized a county seat. The first plat designated a 28-block town site centered by a main square within a 100-acre (40 ha; 0.16 sq mi) tract acquired by Smith County on 6 February 1847. The new town was named for President John Tyler, who advocated for the annexation of Texas by the United States. A log building on the square's north side served as a courthouse and public meeting hall until a brick courthouse displaced it in 1852. The City of Tyler was incorporated on January 29, 1850.

Early religious and social institutions included the First Baptist Church and a Methodist church, a Masonic lodge and an Odd Fellows lodge, and Tyler's first newspaper. Though Tyler's early economy from 1847–1873 was based on agriculture, it was also well-diversified during this period. Logging was a second major industry, while complementary manufacturing included metalworking, milling wood, and leather tanning. As the seat of Smith County, the town also benefited from government activity.

The local agricultural economy relied on slave labor before the Civil War. In 1860, the population of enslaved people in Smith County was 4,982, the 4th most in east Texas. By 1860, Tyler held over 1,000 enslaved persons, which represented 35 percent of the town's population. There was strong support for secession and the Confederacy within Tyler, as a high percentage of its residents voted for secession and many of its men served in the Confederate States Army. The town was a secure enough location during the war for the Trans-Mississippi Department to establish the Tyler Ordnance Works for the resupply of its forces west of the Mississippi River.

=== Post–Civil War era (1865–1900) ===
In 1870, Bonner and Williams established Tyler's first bank. When both the Texas and Pacific Railroad and the International Railroad (Texas) originally eschewed routes through Tyler, townspeople financed the Tyler Tap Railroad to link the town to the national rail grid. Ironically, before that 21-mile line to Big Sandy, Texas was completed in 1877, Tyler had already gotten its desired rail connection when the International–Great Northern Railroad built into town in 1874. Regardless, the Tyler Tap became the seed for the 725-mile-long Texas and St. Louis Railway, which in turn formed the core of the later St. Louis Southwestern Railway, commonly known as the Cotton Belt.

On October 29, 1895, an African American suspect named Robert Henry Hillard was burned at the stake in the Smith County Courthouse Square for the alleged murder of a nineteen-year-old white woman. Denied a trial and due process, Hillard was taken from law enforcement personnel by a white mob. Hillard's executioners were never punished. Later, two entrepreneurs combined photographs from the actual lynching with others staged with actors and sold the 16-image production as a stereographic set. One of the original sets sits in the United States Library of Congress.

=== 20th century to the present day ===
Toward the end of the nineteenth century, fruit orchards emerged as an important business in the regional economy. Eighty percent of the county's agricultural revenue derived from cotton as it persisted as the dominant crop in the first decades of the twentieth century. Peaches were the principal fruit crop as the county fruit tree inventory surpassed one million by 1900. In 1912, Dan Davis, an African-American man suspected of attacking a sixteen-year-old white girl named Carrie Johnson, was burned at the stake in the Smith County Courthouse Square. Disease struck the peach trees, though, and local farmers moved toward growing roses by the 1920s. Twenty years later, most of the U.S. rose supply originated in the Tyler area.

In 1971, the University of Texas system established the University of Texas at Tyler and Broadway Square Mall opened in 1975. By 1980, the population grew to 70,508 and the Roman Catholic Diocese of Tyler and East Texas Islamic Society were established in the following years. During the 2010 East Texas church burnings, two Tyler churches were destroyed, and historic preservation city planning began in 2016 as the population increased and the city continued development.

== Geography ==
The city of Tyler is in the Southern United States, in Northeast Texas. It is sometimes considered part of the wider Ark-La-Tex region where Arkansas, Louisiana, and Texas meet. The city is approximately 38 mi (61 km) from Longview; 61 mi (98 km) from Marshall; 100 mi (160 km) from Dallas; 132 mi (212 km) from Texarkana; 230 mi (370 km) from the state capital of Austin; and 98 mi (158 km) from Shreveport, Louisiana.

Tyler is the seat of government of Smith County, and is surrounded by many suburban communities, including Whitehouse, Lindale, New Chapel Hill, Bullard, Edom, Brownsboro, Kilgore, Flint, and Chandler. According to the United States Census Bureau, the city has an area of 57.97 sq mi (150.1 km^{2}), of which 57.45 sq mi (148.8 km^{2}) is land and 0.52 sq mi (1.3 km^{2}) is covered by water. Tyler is the principal city of the Greater Tyler metropolitan area, and a principal city in the Tyler–Longview area, a conurbation of the Tyler and Longview metropolitan and combined statistical areas.

=== Cityscape ===
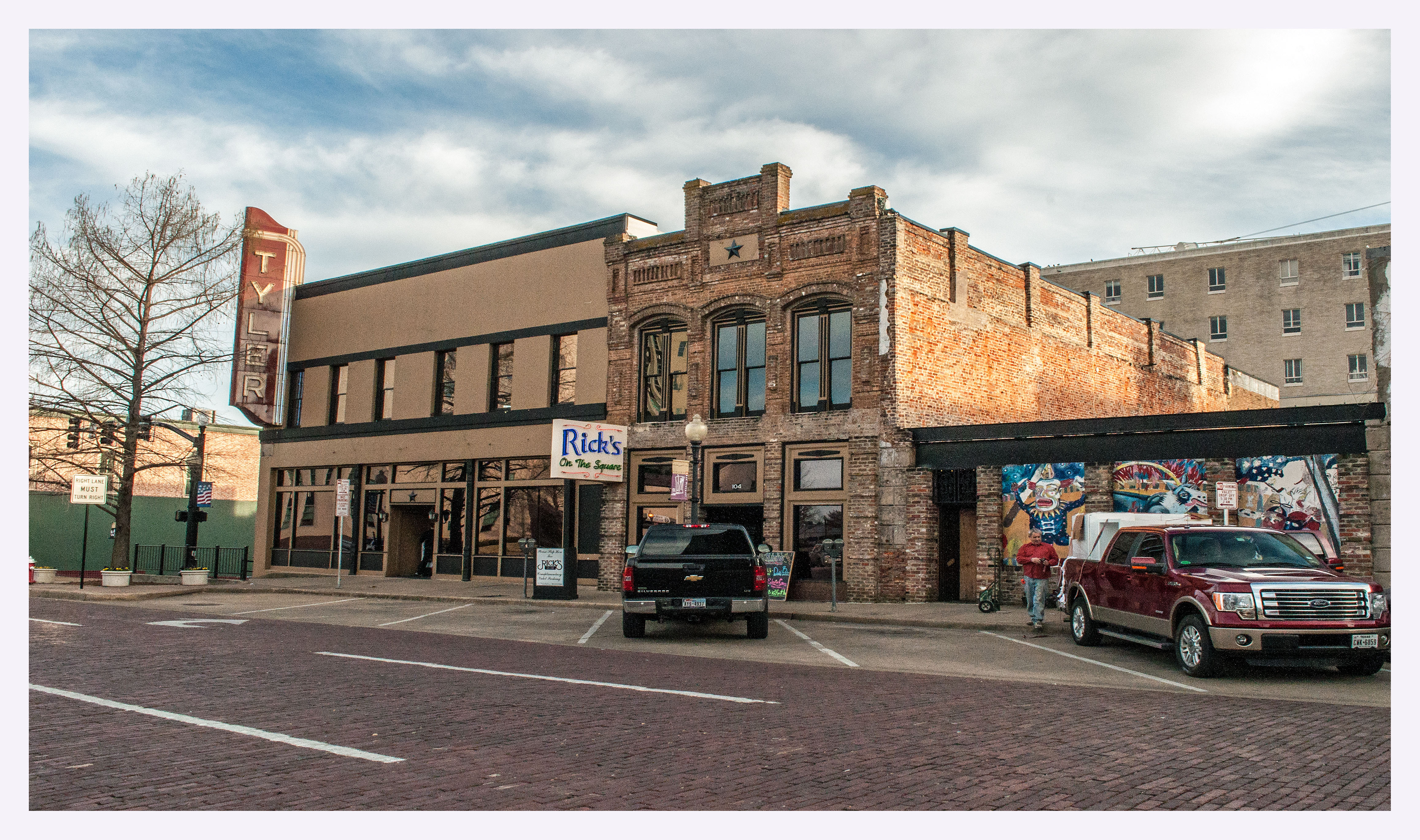
Downtown Tyler

Downtown architecture features the Art Deco and neoclassical styles, many dating from the 19th and early 20th centuries. Modernist- and postmodernist-era structures are also present throughout the cityscape.

Central Tyler is anchored by Brick Streets Historic District and Charnwood Residential Historic District, areas characterized by dense retail, restaurants, nightlife, and historic landmarks. Brick Streets Historic District is the largest geographic area of Tyler. It encompasses 29 blocks and primarily consists of buildings constructed in the 1900s. The district area is predominantly residential though it sometimes serves as a mix-use district. Brick Streets Historic District has brick-paved streets and stone-lined drainage channels. Nearby, Charnwood is Tyler's first historic district. It comprises 12 blocks of late 19th and early 20th century architecture.

=== Climate ===
Tyler experiences weather typical of East Texas. The region is located in the humid subtropical climate typical of the American South.

Severe thunderstorms with heavy rain, hail, damaging winds and tornadoes occur in the area during the spring and summer months. Summer months are hot and humid, with maximum temperatures exceeding 90 °F (32 °C) an average of 91 days per year, with high to very high relative average humidity.

The record high temperature for Tyler is 115 °F (46 °C), which occurred in 2011. The record low for Tyler is −6 °F (−21 °C) on February 16, 2021, during the February 2021 North American cold wave.

Climate data for Tyler, Texas (1991–2020 normals, extremes 1883–present)
Month	Jan	Feb	Mar	Apr	May	Jun	Jul	Aug	Sep	Oct	Nov	Dec	Year
Record high °F (°C)	87 (31)	90 (32)	92 (33)	94 (34)	102 (39)	105 (41)	108 (42)	110 (43)	109 (43)	100 (38)	88 (31)	84 (29)	110 (43)
Mean daily maximum °F (°C)	57.9 (14.4)	62.6 (17.0)	70.4 (21.3)	77.3 (25.2)	83.7 (28.7)	89.9 (32.2)	93.1 (33.9)	93.6 (34.2)	87.6 (30.9)	78.1 (25.6)	66.4 (19.1)	58.8 (14.9)	76.6 (24.8)
Daily mean °F (°C)	48.2 (9.0)	52.4 (11.3)	59.6 (15.3)	66.2 (19.0)	73.7 (23.2)	80.3 (26.8)	83.4 (28.6)	83.4 (28.6)	77.4 (25.2)	67.4 (19.7)	56.7 (13.7)	49.5 (9.7)	66.5 (19.2)
Mean daily minimum °F (°C)	38.5 (3.6)	42.2 (5.7)	48.7 (9.3)	55.2 (12.9)	63.7 (17.6)	70.7 (21.5)	73.6 (23.1)	73.2 (22.9)	67.2 (19.6)	56.7 (13.7)	47.0 (8.3)	40.2 (4.6)	56.4 (13.6)
Record low °F (°C)	−3 (−19)	−6 (−21)	13 (−11)	27 (−3)	37 (3)	47 (8)	51 (11)	47 (8)	36 (2)	24 (−4)	10 (−12)	0 (−18)	−6 (−21)
Average precipitation inches (mm)	3.95 (100)	4.26 (108)	4.25 (108)	3.99 (101)	4.32 (110)	4.78 (121)	2.72 (69)	2.92 (74)	3.23 (82)	4.72 (120)	3.84 (98)	4.68 (119)	47.66 (1,211)
Average precipitation days (≥ 0.01 in)	9.1	9.1	9.7	8.4	9.5	8.5	6.9	6.6	6.5	7.2	8.5	9.2	99.2
Source: NOAA

== Demographics ==
Historical population
Census	Pop.	Note	%±
1880	2,423		—
1890	6,908		185.1%
1900	8,069		16.8%
1910	10,400		28.9%
1920	12,085		16.2%
1930	17,113		41.6%
1940	28,279		65.2%
1950	38,968		37.8%
1960	51,230		31.5%
1970	57,770		12.8%
1980	70,508		22.0%
1990	75,450		7.0%
2000	83,650		10.9%
2010	96,900		15.8%
2020	105,995		9.4%
2024 (est.)	112,219		5.9%
U.S. Decennial Census; Texas Almanac: 1850-2000; 2020 Census

With a population of 2,423 at the 1880 census, the city of Tyler grew to become the most populous city in Northeast Texas, and remains one of the state's larger municipalities. The Tyler–Longview area had an estimated population of 416,662 in 2022, and when the U.S. Census Bureau released population estimates for 2022, Tyler was estimated to have a population of 109,286 as of July 1, 2022.

=== Racial and ethnic composition ===
According to the United States Census Bureau, the city's ethnic makeup has become increasingly diverse, owing to white flight starting in the 1940s, immigration and internal migration.

Tyler city, Texas – Racial and ethnic composition Note: the US Census treats Hispanic/Latino as an ethnic category. This table excludes Latinos from the racial categories and assigns them to a separate category. Hispanics/Latinos may be of any race.
Race / Ethnicity (NH = Non-Hispanic)	Pop 2000	Pop 2010	Pop 2020	% 2000	% 2010	% 2020
White alone (NH)	46,486	49,252	50,785	55.57%	50.83%	47.91%
Black or African American alone (NH)	22,155	23,742	24,126	26.49%	24.50%	22.76%
Native American or Alaska Native alone (NH)	198	284	254	0.24%	0.29%	0.24%
Asian alone (NH)	800	1,807	2,988	0.96%	1.86%	2.82%
Pacific Islander alone (NH)	17	18	39	0.02%	0.02%	0.04%
Some Other Race alone (NH)	52	125	352	0.06%	0.13%	0.33%
Mixed race or Multiracial (NH)	708	1,161	3,428	0.85%	1.20%	3.23%
Hispanic or Latino (any race)	13,234	20,511	24,023	15.82%	21.17%	22.66%
Total	83,650	96,900	105,995	100.00%	100.00%	100.00%

=== 2020 census ===
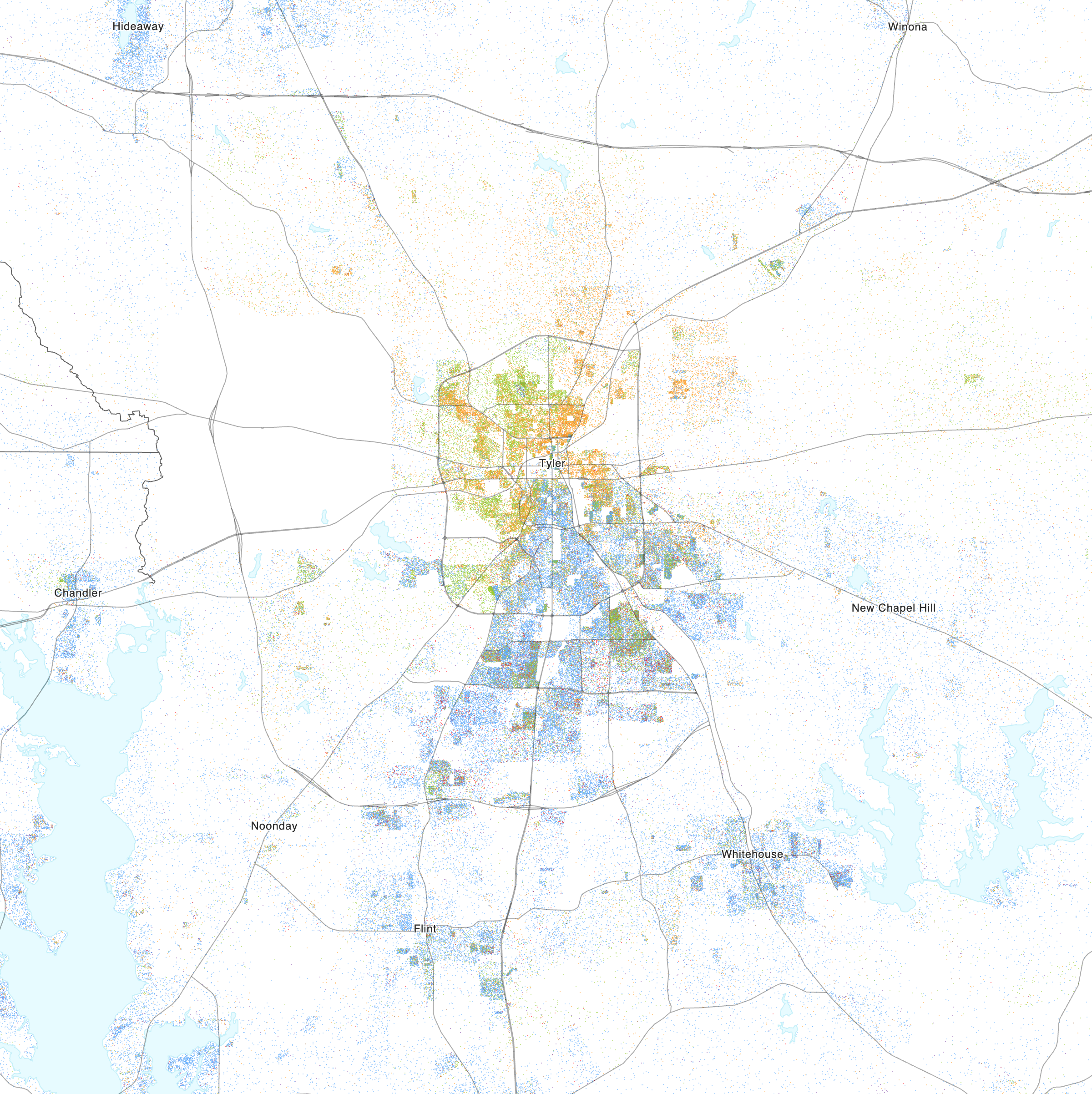
Map of racial distribution in Tyler, 2020 U.S. census. Each dot is one person: ⬤ White ⬤ Black ⬤ Asian ⬤ Hispanic ⬤ Multiracial ⬤ Native American/Other

As of the 2020 census, Tyler had a population of 105,995, making it the most populous city in Northeast Texas and the 33rd most populous in Texas. The median age was 35.4 years. 22.3% of residents were under the age of 18 and 17.7% of residents were 65 years of age or older. For every 100 females there were 89.0 males, and for every 100 females age 18 and over there were 85.4 males age 18 and over.

99.8% of residents lived in urban areas, while 0.2% lived in rural areas.

There were 41,836 households in Tyler, of which 29.0% had children under the age of 18 living in them. Of all households, 41.1% were married-couple households, 18.3% were households with a male householder and no spouse or partner present, and 35.0% were households with a female householder and no spouse or partner present. About 31.9% of all households were made up of individuals and 12.8% had someone living alone who was 65 years of age or older.

There were 46,320 housing units, of which 9.7% were vacant. The homeowner vacancy rate was 1.7% and the rental vacancy rate was 11.2%.

Tyler's metropolitan statistical area had 233,479 residents in 2020, remaining the second-largest in the region behind the Longview metropolitan area.

According to the 2020 redistricting data, there were 50,785 non-Hispanic white residents and 24,023 people of Hispanic or Latino ancestry, of any race, among a population that also included 55,594 residents identifying as White (52.4%), 24,496 as Black or African American (23.1%), 3,028 as Asian (2.9%), and 10,218 as two or more races (9.6%).

Racial composition as of the 2020 census
Race	Number	Percent
White	55,594	52.4%
Black or African American	24,496	23.1%
American Indian and Alaska Native	689	0.7%
Asian	3,028	2.9%
Native Hawaiian and Other Pacific Islander	57	0.1%
Some other race	11,913	11.2%
Two or more races	10,218	9.6%
Hispanic or Latino (of any race)	24,023	22.7%

Among the city's growing population as of 2019, there were 46,320 households and 43,733 housing units. Of the units at the 2019 American Community Survey, 37,504 were occupied and the majority were single-unit detached homes. Tylerites had a home-ownership rate of 51.7%, and renters occupied 48.3% of the housing units from 2014 to 2019's census estimates. Owner-occupied housing units had a median cost of $164,700, and the median cost with a mortgage was $1,408 while houses without a mortgage had a median cost of $487; renters paid a median of $1,011 a month, and 1,148 rental-units had no rent paid among the population. Overall, the city of Tyler is more affordable than nearby Dallas.

A predominantly middle-class community, the city of Tyler had a median income of $52,294 and mean income of $75,349. Families had a median income of $66,579; married-couple families $85,181; and non-family households $32,263. Down from a poverty rate of 16.7% in 2018, approximately 12.6% of the population lived at or below the poverty line in 2019.

=== Religion ===
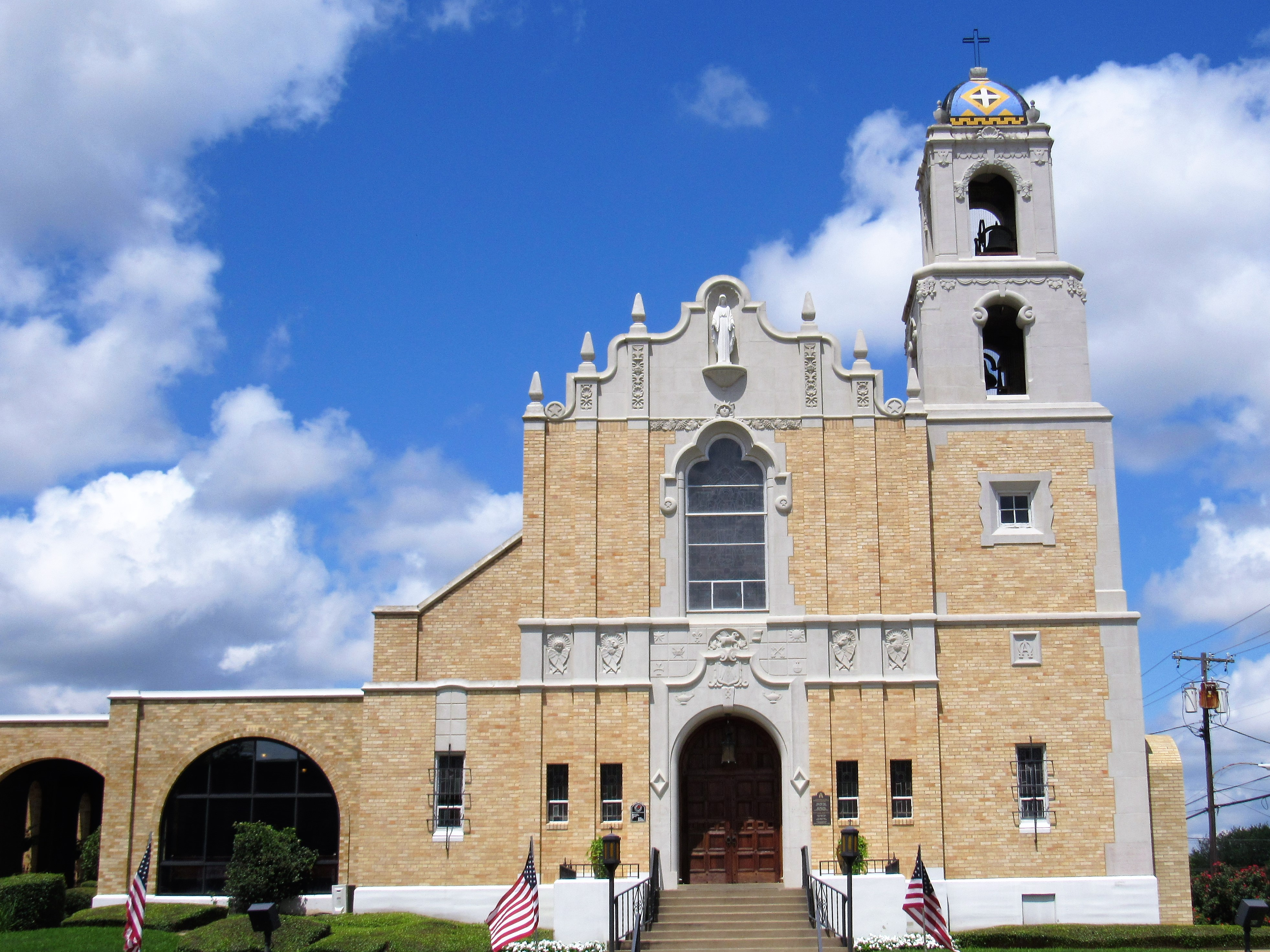
Cathedral of the Immaculate Conception, see of the Roman Catholic Diocese of Tyler

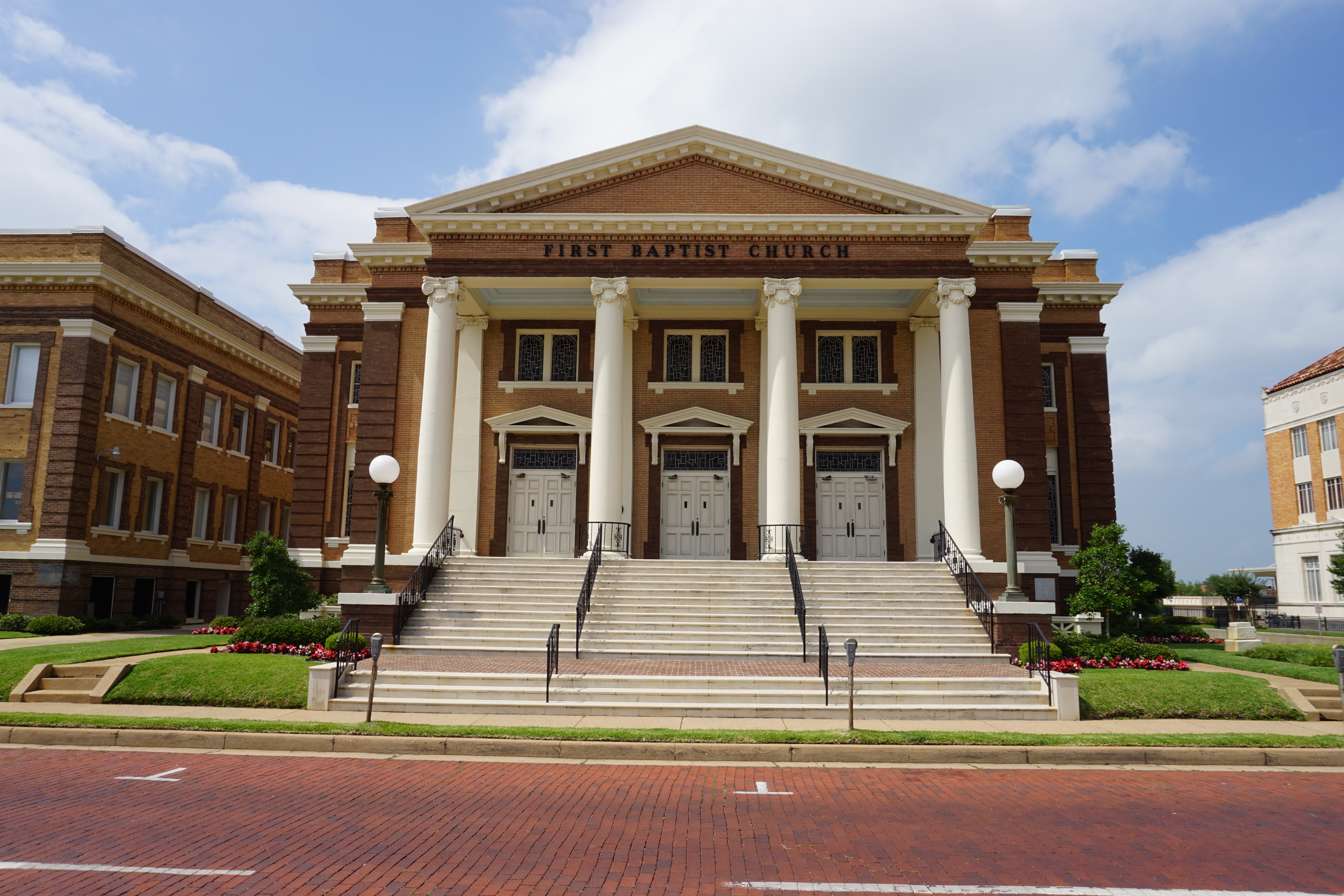
First Baptist Church of Tyler

A 2020 study by Sperling's BestPlaces found that 73.2% of residents of the Tyler area identified as religious or spiritual. Tyler is considered to be located in the Bible Belt, a region dominated by Protestant Christianity. There is also a significant Roman Catholic community. According to this 2020 study, 31.1% of Tylerite Christians identified as Baptist, primarily affiliated with the Texas Baptists, Southern Baptist Convention, National Baptist Convention, USA, Inc, National Baptist Convention of America, and Full Gospel Baptist Church Fellowship. The Roman Catholic community of Tyler and its metropolitan area have been primarily served by the Roman Catholic Diocese of Tyler. Following, 6.6% of the population were Methodists, mainly affiliated with the United Methodist Church and African Methodist Episcopal Church.

According to a separate 2020 study by the Association of Religion Data Archives, Baptists, non/inter-denominational Protestants, and Roman Catholics constituted the largest share of Christendom for Tyler metropolitan area. The same study from the Association of Religion Data Archives tabulated 11,161 Methodists divided among the African Methodist Episcopal, Christian Methodist Episcopal, and United Methodist churches.

Per Sperling's, Pentecostals formed the fourth-largest Christian group in Tyler (5.2%) and the largest Pentecostal bodies within the area as of 2020 by both separate studies are the Church of God in Christ, Assemblies of God USA and the United Pentecostal Church, prominent Trinitarian and Oneness Pentecostal denominations. An estimated 1.2% of the religiously affiliated population were Latter-day Saints. Of the Christian population, 0.9% identified as Anglicans or Episcopalians, 0.7% Presbyterian, and 0.6% Lutheran. Roughly 13.6% of Tylerites are of another Christian faith including the Eastern Orthodox Church and Jehovah's Witnesses.

The Anglican or Episcopalian community is divided between adherents of the Episcopal Church in the United States and Anglican Church in North America. The Episcopal Church USA-affiliated Episcopal Diocese of Texas has congregations in Tyler. The Anglican Church in North America also has congregations in Tyler and its metropolitan area. The Diocese of Mid-America is the ACNA's diocese in Tyler, consisting of one church as of 2020. This diocese is also a member of the Reformed Episcopal Church. Presbyterian and Lutheran bodies operating in the area include the Presbyterian Church (USA) and Presbyterian Church in America, and the Lutheran Church (Missouri Synod) and North American Lutheran Church. The Eastern Orthodox community is served by the Orthodox Church in America's Diocese of the South with its headquarters in nearby Dallas.

== Economy ==
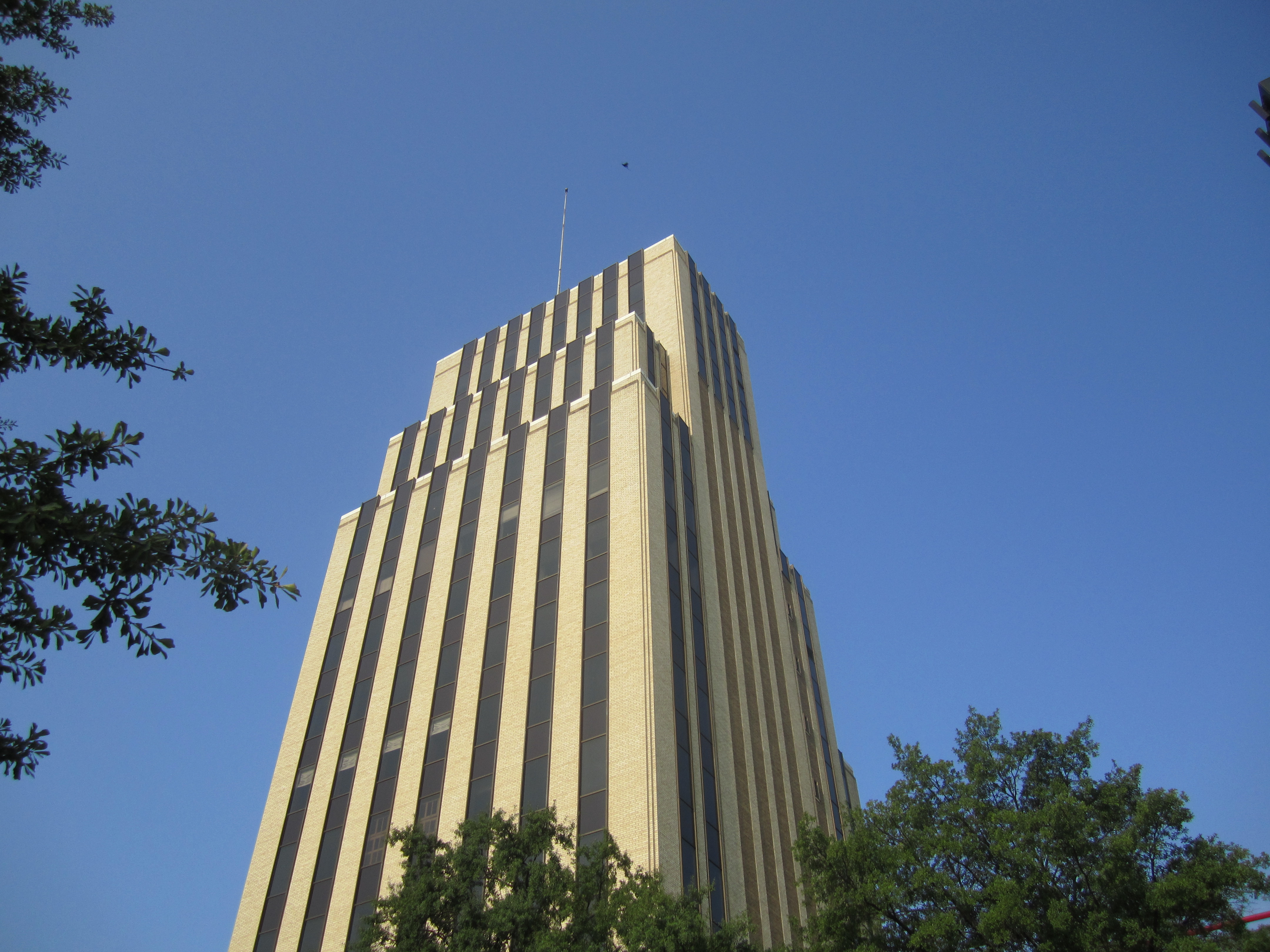
People's Petroleum building in downtown Tyler

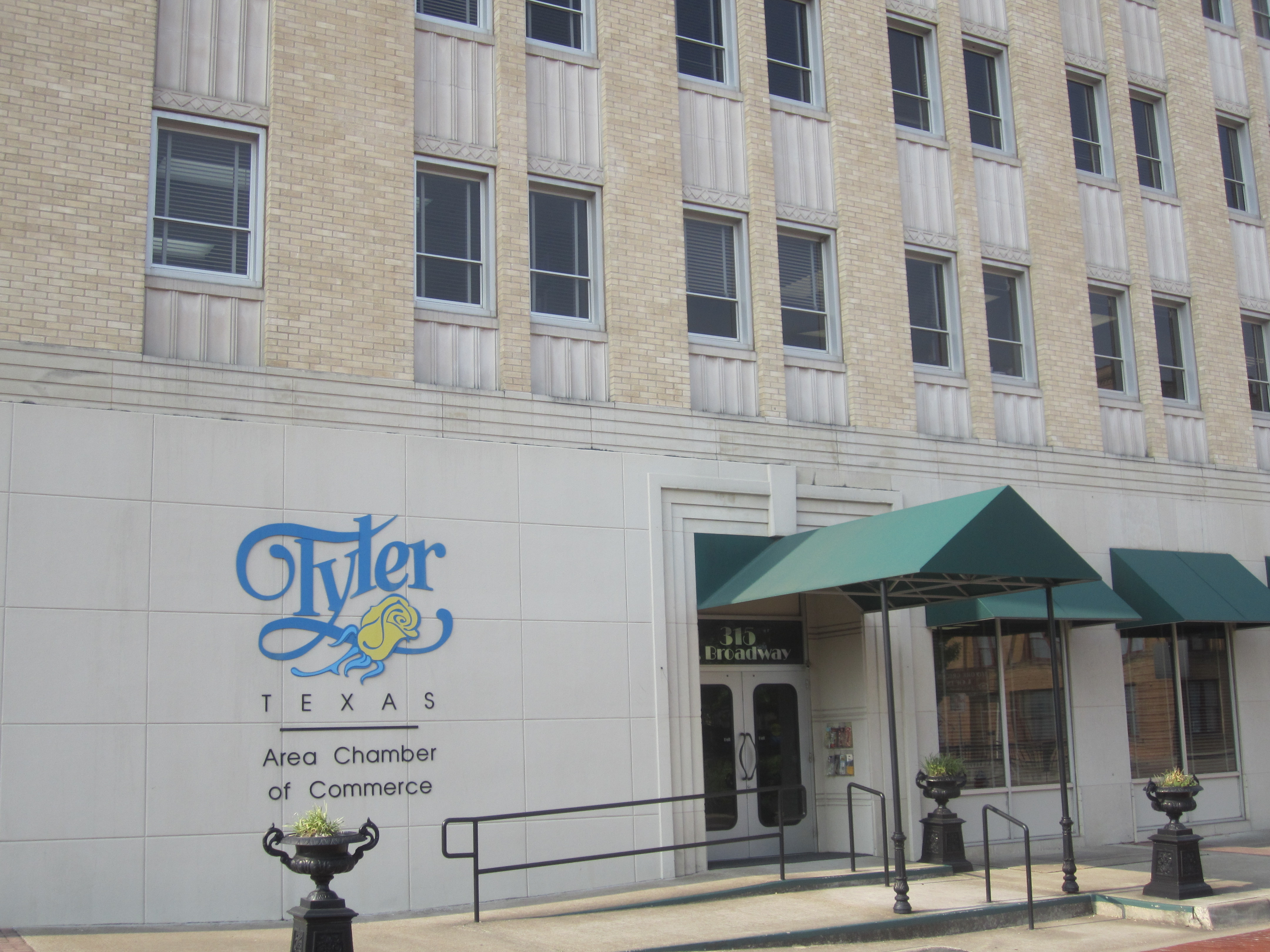
Chamber of Commerce office in downtown Tyler

In addition to the city's role in the rose-growing industry, Tyler is the headquarters for Brookshire Grocery Company, which operates Brookshire's, Fresh, Super 1 Foods, and Spring Market supermarkets in the Ark-La-Tex and parts of Dallas–Fort Worth. The company's main distribution center is in south Tyler, while SouthWest Foods, a subsidiary that processes dairy products, is just northeast of the city.

The city and metropolitan area also has a growing manufacturing sector including: Tyler Pipe, a subsidiary of McWane Inc. that produces soil and utility pipe products; Trane Technologies, formerly a unit of American Standard Companies, which manufactures air conditioners and heat pumps (this plant was originally built in 1955 by General Electric); Delek Refining, formerly La Gloria Oil and Gas Co (a Crown Central Petroleum subsidiary); PCSFerguson, an operating company of Dover Corporation that specializes in equipment for the measurement and production of natural gas using the plunger lift method; DYNAenergetics Tyler Distribution Center, part of DYNAenergetics USA, which manufactures perforating equipment and explosives for the oil and gas industry; and Vesuvius USA, a manufacturer of refractory ceramics used in the steel industry.

According to the city's 2022–2023 Comprehensive Annual Financial Report, the city's top ten employers were:

#	Employer	Employees
1	Christus Trinity Mother Frances Health System	5,000
2	UT Health East Texas	3,500
3	Tyler Independent School District	2,550
4	Sanderson Farms	1,750
5	Walmart	1,500
6 (tie)	Trane Technologies	1,450
6 (tie)	Brookshire Grocery Company	1,450
6 (tie)	The Health Science Center at UT Tyler	1,450
7	University of Texas at Tyler	1,200
8	Optimum Communications	1,150
9 (tie)	John Soules Foods	1,000
9 (tie)	Tyler Junior College	1,000
9 (tie)	Target Distribution Center	1,000
10 (tie)	City of Tyler	850
10 (tie)	Smith County	850

== Recreation and tourism ==
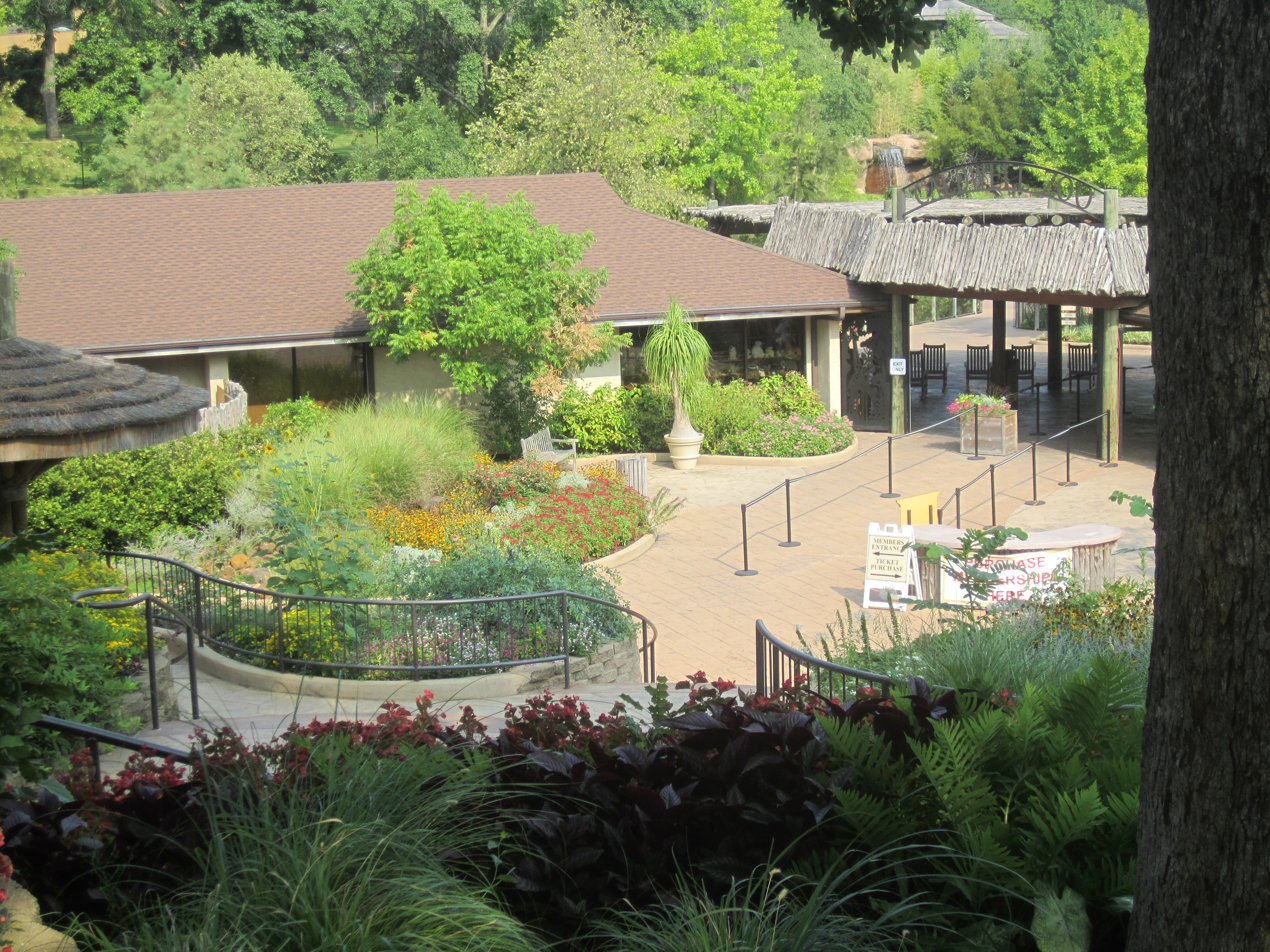
Caldwell Zoo entrance

Annually, the Texas Rose Festival draws thousands of tourists to Tyler. The festival, which celebrates the role of the rose-growing industry in the local economy, is held in October and features a parade, the coronation of the Rose Queen, and other civic events. The Rose Museum is within the Tyler Municipal Rose Garden and features the history of the festival.

Tyler is home to Caldwell Zoo, several local museums, Lake Bellwood, Lake Palestine, Lake Tyler, and numerous golf courses and country clubs. A few miles away in Flint, Texas is The WaterPark @ The Villages, a year-round, indoor water park.

An "Azalea Trail" in Tyler consists of two officially designated routes within the city that showcase homes or other landscaped venues adorned with azalea shrubs. The Azalea Trail is home to a long-standing tradition of official greeters known as the Azalea Belles. Young women are chosen to fill the role each year from Tyler-area high schools or home school families in the Tyler area, and dress in antebellum gowns.

Tyler State Park, a few miles north of the city limits, attracts visitors with opportunities to camp, canoe, and paddle boat on the lake. Other available pastimes include picnicking, boating (motors have a 5 mph (8.0 km/h) speed limit), boat rentals, fishing, birding, hiking, mountain biking, hiking trails, lake swimming (in an unsupervised swimming area), and nature study.

The Smith County Historical Society operates a museum and archives in the old Carnegie Library. The East Texas State Fair is held annually in Tyler. Harvey Convention Center, the largest building at Tyler's fairgrounds is slated for demolition in August 2021. Lake Tyler was the location of the HGTV Dream Home contest in 2005. The 6,500 sq ft (600 m^{2}) house helped to boost tourism and interest in the community and surrounding areas. It was subsequently sold at public auction in January 2008, for US$1,325,000 (equivalent to $1,981,356 in 2025).

=== Juneteenth ===
Juneteenth (celebrating the freedom and emancipation of African Americans from slavery) has become a major cultural and educational observance in Tyler, with events organized primarily by the Juneteenth Association of Tyler. Since at least 2024, the Association has hosted a weekend of community-focused programming that celebrates emancipation, promotes heritage awareness, and supports youth through scholarships.

Annual events include a children’s “Power Wheel Parade” at Woldert Park, gospel concerts, a community parade down West Martin Luther King Boulevard, and a festival with live music, food, booths, and educational activities. In 2025, the Association also distributed scholarships to local high‑school students as part of the holiday observances.

Local news coverage emphasizes that Juneteenth in Tyler goes beyond celebration—it centers on empowerment, with educational outreach, community unity, and recognition of progress in civil rights and schooling. As a result, Juneteenth has taken on the role of “Freedom Day” in Tyler, blending cultural pride, historical remembrance, and civic investment.

=== Historical ===
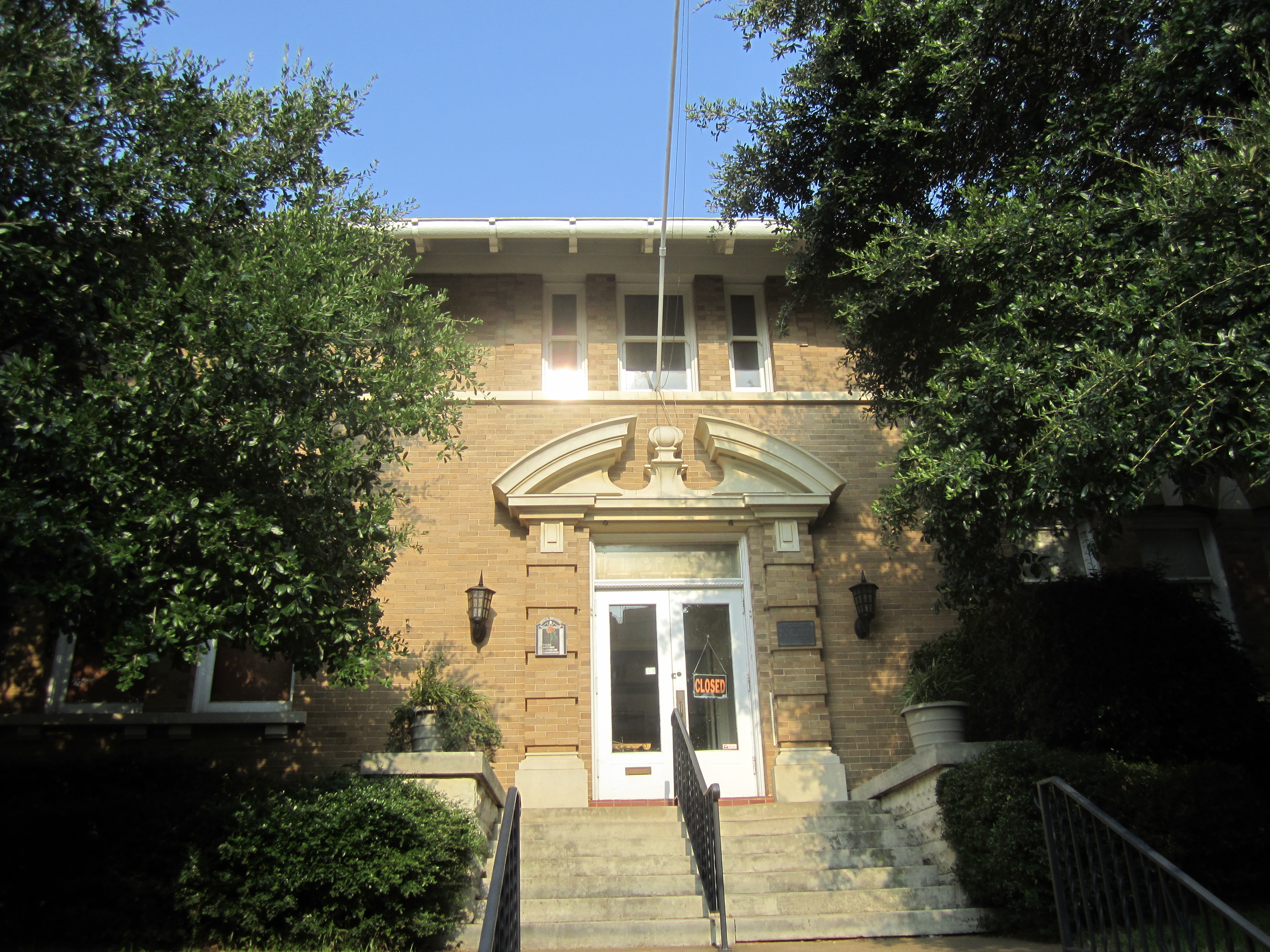
The Smith County Historical Society building is across the street from the Tyler Public Library

Tyler is home to the Cotton Belt Railroad Depot Museum, located near the Chamber of Commerce office.

Individuals and business firms dedicated to discovering, collecting, and preserving data, records, and other items relating to the history of Smith County, Texas, founded The Smith County Historical Society, a 501(c)(3) non-profit organization, in 1959. The society operates a museum and archives in the former Carnegie Public Library building in downtown Tyler. Permanent museum exhibits include life-size dioramas of Smith County history, with topics ranging from the Caddo Indians to the 20th century.

Other items from the society's collections are showcased in revolving, temporary exhibits. The society's archival library contains historical artifacts of Smith County, including newspapers, city directories, school records, photographs, maps, historical papers, and rare books. The archives are open to the public for research on a limited schedule with volunteer staff on duty. The society is also the official caretaker of Camp Ford Historic Park.

Camp Ford was the largest Confederate Prisoner of War camp west of the Mississippi River during the American Civil War. The original site of the camp stockade is a public historic park managed by the Smith County Historical Society. The park contains a kiosk, paved trail, interpretive signage, a cabin reconstruction, and a picnic area. It is on Highway 271, 0.8 mi (1.3 km) north of Loop 323.

== Sports ==
=== College and university teams ===
UT Tyler women's basketball team

- University of Texas at Tyler Patriots (NCAA Division II)
- Texas College Steers (NAIA; HBCU)
- Tyler Junior College Apaches (NJCAA)

=== Baseball teams ===
- Tyler Elbertas (1912)
- Tyler Trojans (1924–1929, 1931, 1935–1940, 1946–1950)
- Tyler Sports (1932)
- Tyler Governors (1933–1934)
- Tyler East Texans (1950–1953)
- Tyler Tigers (1954–1955)
- Tyler Wildcatters (1994–1997)
- Tyler Roughnecks (2001)
- Tyler Knockouts (2026–present)

=== Football ===
- East Texas Twisters (2004)

=== Road races ===
- Fresh 15 Road Race (Annual)

=== Soccer ===
- Tyler FC (2016–present)

=== Disc golf ===
- Tyler features fifteen disc golf courses and seven leagues, and the surrounding area features a total of thirty-six courses and seventeen leagues. For these reasons, users of the disc golf app UDisc ranked Tyler as the second best disc golf destination in Texas and third best in the United States.

== Government ==
=== Local government ===
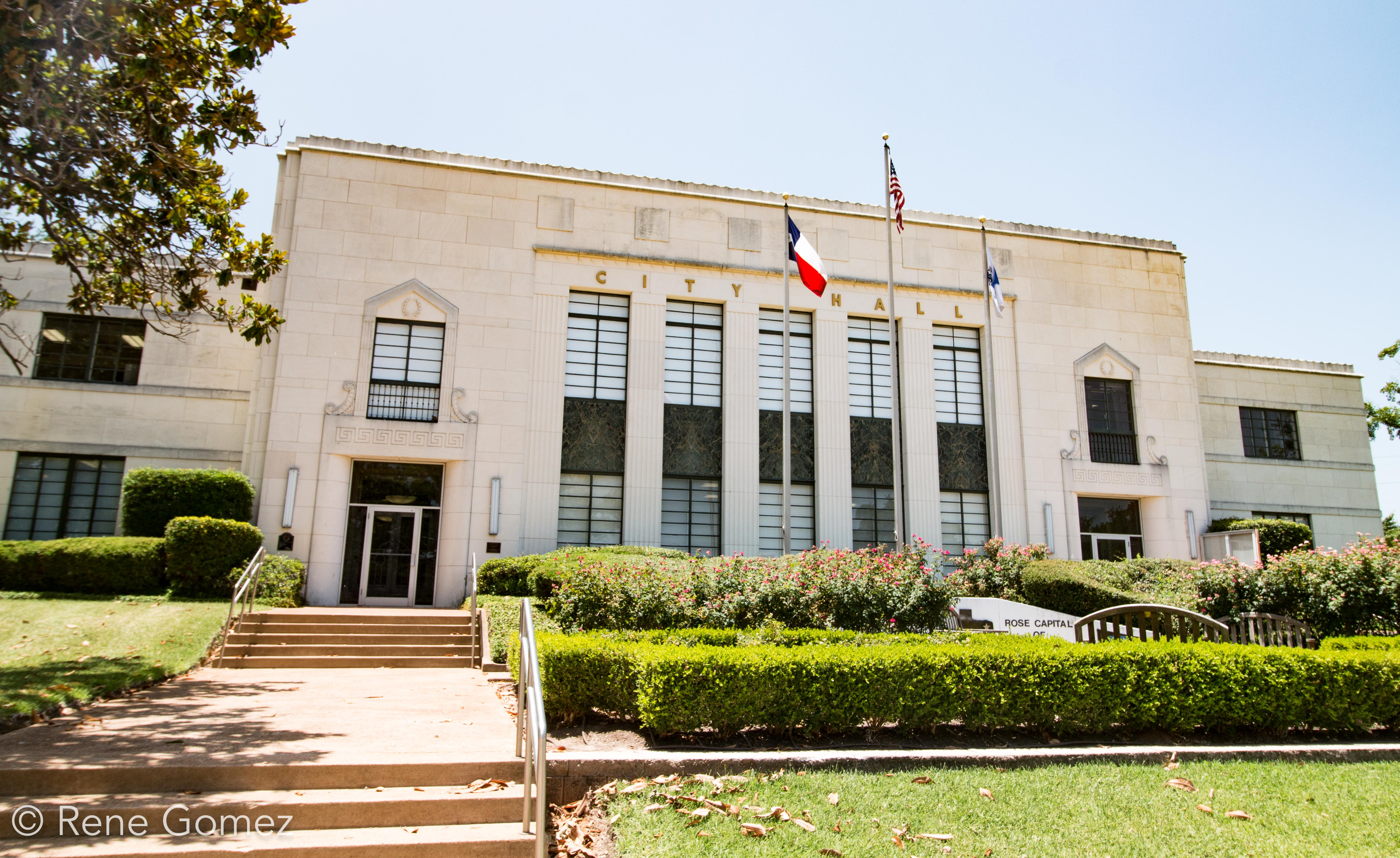
City Hall

According to the city's 2022–2023 Comprehensive Annual Financial Report, the city had $93.9 million in revenues, $89.9 million in expenditures, $884.8 million in total assets, $328.3 million in total liabilities, and $241.1 million in cash and investments.

List of mayors of Tyler, Texas
- McDonald Lorance, 1846
- William Bartlett, c. 1848
- ?
- Thomas Jefferson Dobbs, c. 1890
- ?
- Oscar Burton, c. 1937
- Zeb J. Spruiell, c. 1955
- ?
- Murph Wilson, 1967
- ?
- Jack H. Halbert, 1970–1976
- ?
- Norman Shtofman, 1982–1984
- Smith Reynolds Jr., (1990–1996)
- Kevin Eltife, c. 1996–2002
- Joey Seeber, 2002–2008
- Barbara Bass, 2008–2014
- Martin Heines, 2014–2020
- Don Warren, 2020–present

The Northeast Texas Public Health District is a political subdivision under the State of Texas established by the City of Tyler and Smith County. In place for nearly 70 years, the Health District became a separate entity in 1994, with an administrative Public Health Board. With a stated vision "To be the Healthiest Community in Texas", the district has a full-time staff of over 130 employees. The Health District has a broad range of services and responsibilities dedicated to their mission: "To Protect, Promote, and Provide for the Health of Our Community."

=== State government ===
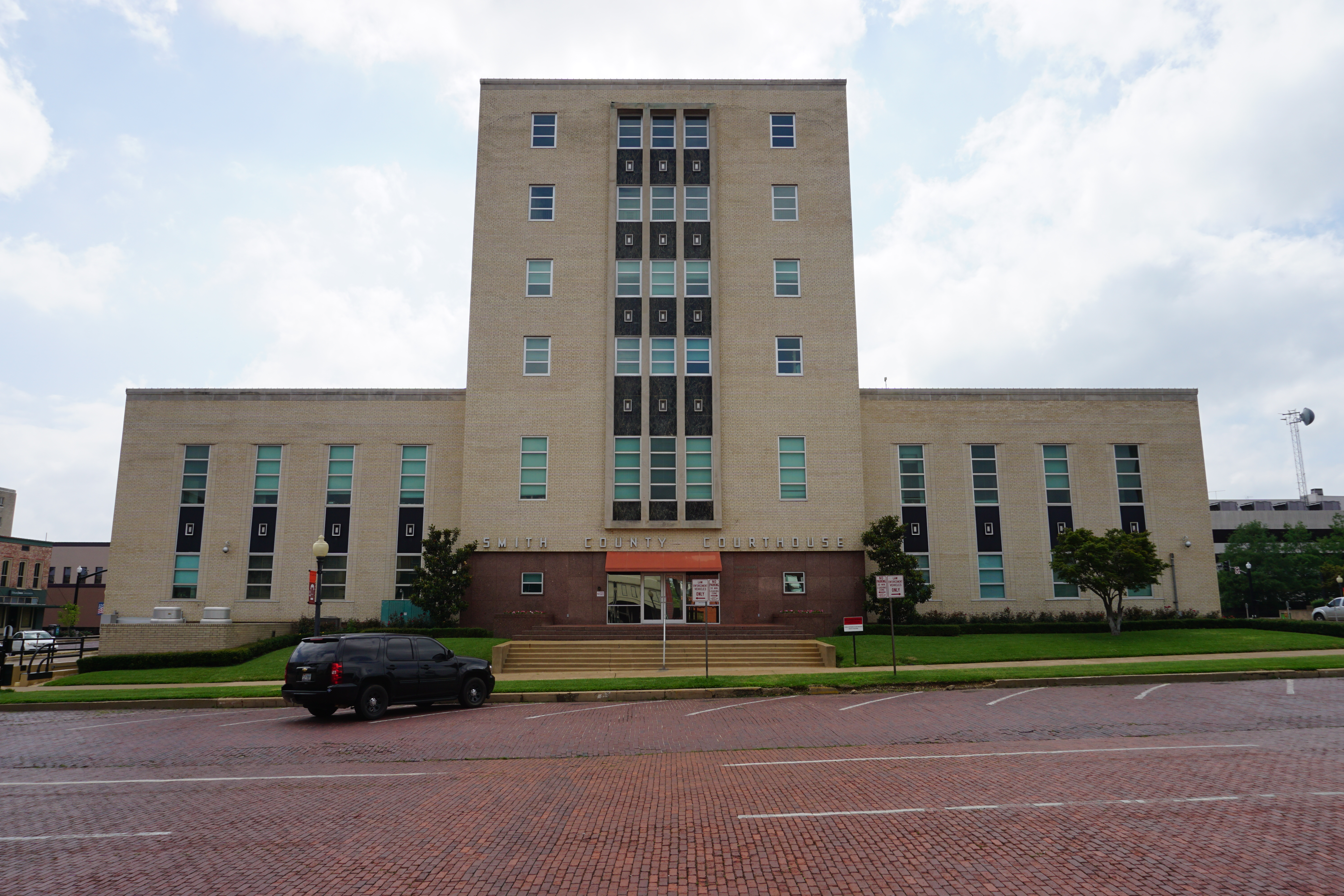
Smith County Courthouse

Tyler is represented in the Texas Senate by Republican Bryan Hughes, District 1, and in the Texas House of Representatives by Republican Matt Schaefer, District 6. The Texas Twelfth Court of Appeals is in Tyler. The Texas Department of Criminal Justice operates the Region I Parole Division Office and the Tyler District Parole Office in Tyler.

=== Federal government ===
The two U.S. senators from Texas are Republicans John Cornyn and Ted Cruz. Tyler is part of Texas's 1st congressional district, which is currently represented by Republican Nathaniel Moran. Tyler is one of the divisions of the United States District Court for the Eastern District of Texas. The United States Postal Service operates several post offices in Tyler, including Tyler, Azalea, Southeast Crossing, and the South Tyler Annex.

== Education ==
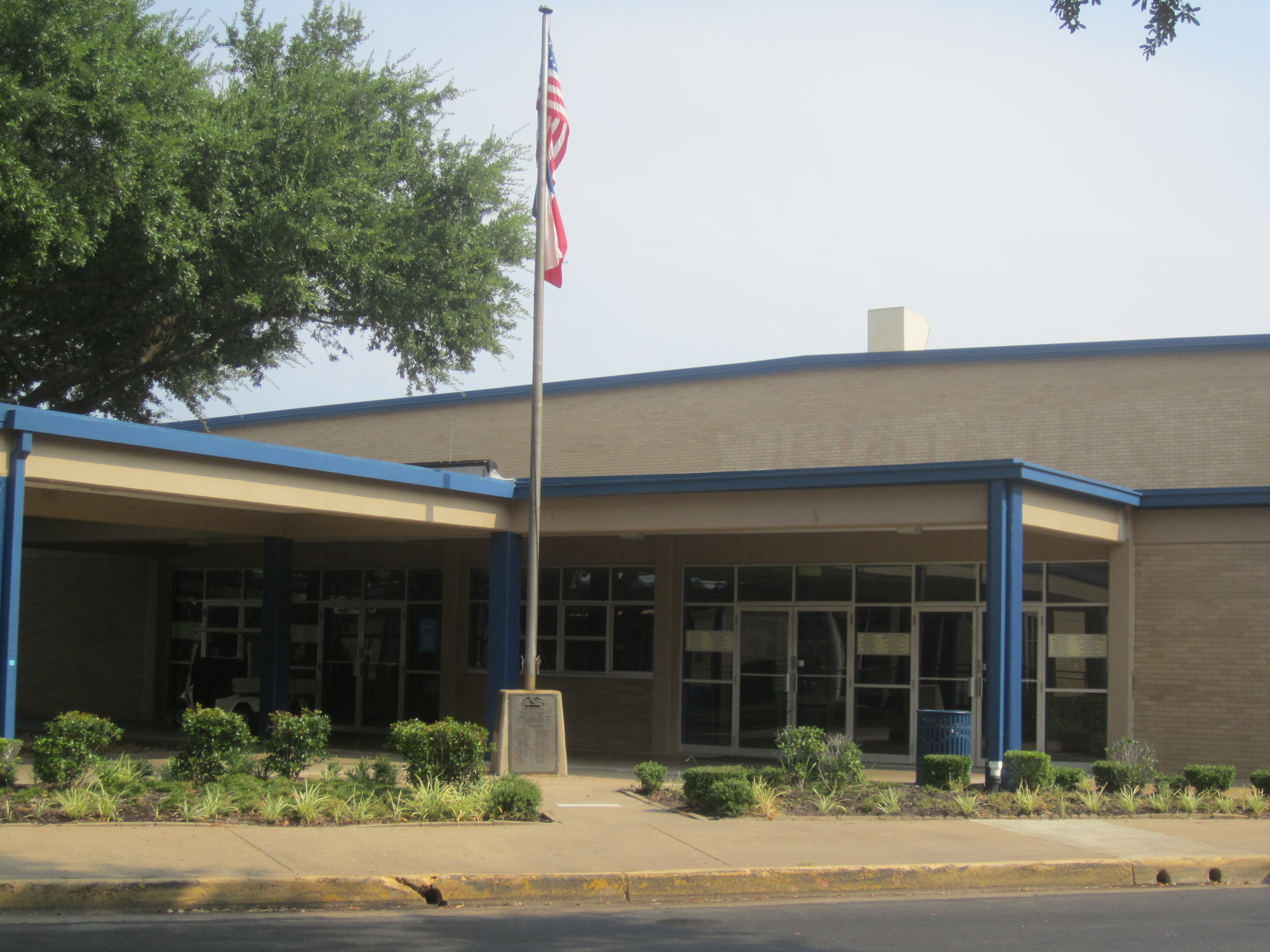
Tyler High School

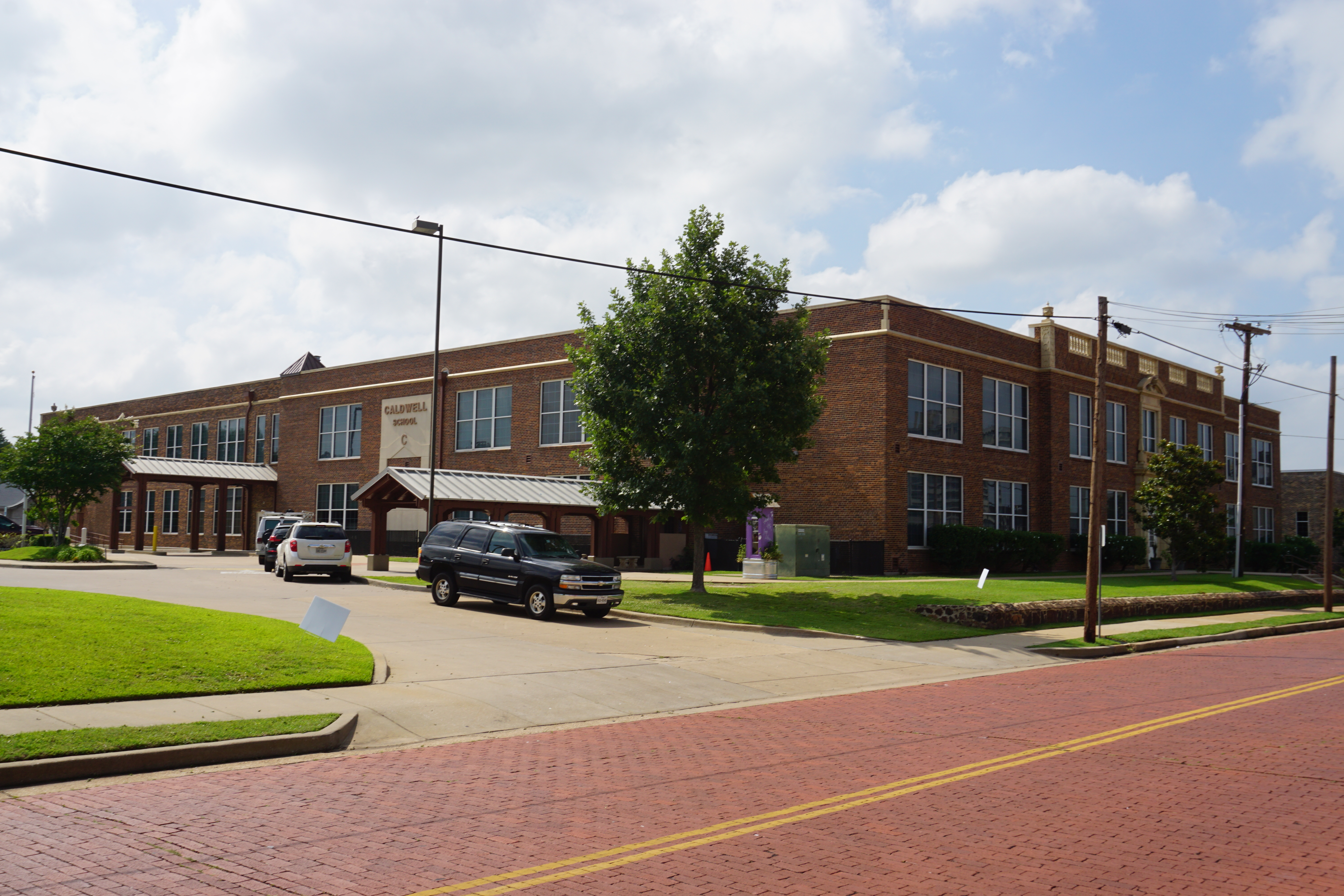
Caldwell Elementary School Arts Academy

=== Colleges and universities ===
Tyler's higher education institutions include the University of Texas at Tyler and the University of Texas Health Center at Tyler, both part of the University of Texas System, as well as Texas College, the city's only HBCU, and Tyler Junior College.

=== Primary and secondary schools ===
Public primary and secondary education for much of the city is provided by the Tyler Independent School District, which includes high schools Tyler High School (previously known as John Tyler High School) and Tyler Legacy High School (previously known as Robert E. Lee High School), as well as Tyler ISD Early College High School, Premier High School of Tyler, a public charter school (Cumberland Academy). Several Tyler schools offer international baccalaureate and advanced placement programs.

Tyler has several magnet schools with expanded educational opportunities. These schools include:

- Caldwell Arts Academy – K–8 – National Blue Ribbon school providing arts-infused curriculum
- Birdwell Dual Language Immersion School – K–8 – focuses on biliteracy, bilingualism, and sociocultural capital
- Moore Middle School – 6–8 – offers specialized curriculum for exceptional STEM students
- Early College High School – 9–12 – students can earn a high school diploma and a college degree at the same time in partnership with Tyler Junior College. Ranked in 2024 as the #1 academic high school in East Texas.

Tyler is also home to the University of Texas at Tyler University Academy at Tyler, a K–12 public charter operated by the University of Texas at Tyler since 2012 that offers university courses to students in grades 9–12.

Portions of incorporated Tyler are served by surrounding school districts. These include sections of southeast Tyler, served by the Whitehouse Independent School District, and some sections in the east which are served by the chapel Hill Independent School District.

=== Private schools ===
There are also private schools in Tyler, including Grace Community School (Texas), All Saints Episcopal School, Seventh-day Adventist Church School, King's Academy Christian School, Kingdom Life Academy (in the same building but not affiliated with King's Academy), Christian Heritage School, East Texas Christian Academy, and Good Shepherd Reformed Episcopal School. The Brook Hill School in nearby Bullard, TX, also serves the Tyler area. The Tyler Catholic School System of the Catholic Diocese of Tyler consists of St. Gregory Cathedral School and Bishop Thomas K. Gorman Regional Catholic Middle and High School.

== Media ==
Tyler has 24 media outlets and one newspaper. There are many others in the surrounding area.

=== Newspaper ===
- Tyler Morning Telegraph

=== Television ===
VHF/UHF Channel	Call Letters	Network
7	KLTV	ABC; Telemundo (DT3)
19	KYTX	CBS; The CW Plus (DT2)
51	KFXK-TV	Fox; MyNetworkTV (DT2)
54	KCEB	Fubo Sports Network
56	KETK	NBC

=== Radio ===
==== AM stations ====
Frequency	Call Letters	Format	Name
600	KTBB	News/Talk	
1330	KGLD	Gospel	The Light
1490	KYZS	Classic Hits	K-DOK (relay of KDOK Kilgore)

==== FM stations ====
Frequency	Call Letters	Format	Name
88.7	KZLO	Christian Contemporary	KLOVE
89.5	KVNE	Christian Contemporary	Encouragement FM
91.3	KGLY	Religious	Lift 91.3
92.1	KRWR	Sports	92.1 The Team
93.1	KTYL	Hot Adult Contemporary	Mix 93.1
94.3	KZWL	Christian Teaching	The Well
96.1	KKTX	Classic Rock	Classic Rock 96.1
96.7	KOYE	Regional Mexican	La Invasora
97.5	KTBB-FM	News/Talk	KTBB
99.3	KAPW	Spanish Pop	Mega 99.3
99.7	KFRO-FM	Classic Hits	East Texas Greatest Hits 99.7 KFRO
101.5	KNUE	Country	Today's Country 101.5 KNUE
102.3	KLFZ	Spanish Christian	Fuzíon 102.3
102.7	KBLZ	Urban Contemporary	102.7 The Blaze
104.1	KKUS	Classic Country	104.1 The Ranch
106.5	KOOI	Variety Hits	106.5 Jack FM
107.3	KISX	Urban Adult Contemporary	107.3 Kiss-FM

== Healthcare ==
Hospitals in Tyler include UT Health Tyler, Trinity Mother Frances Health System, UT Health North Campus Tyler, and Texas Spine & Joint Hospital. There are also many clinics including the Direct Care Clinic.

== Transportation ==
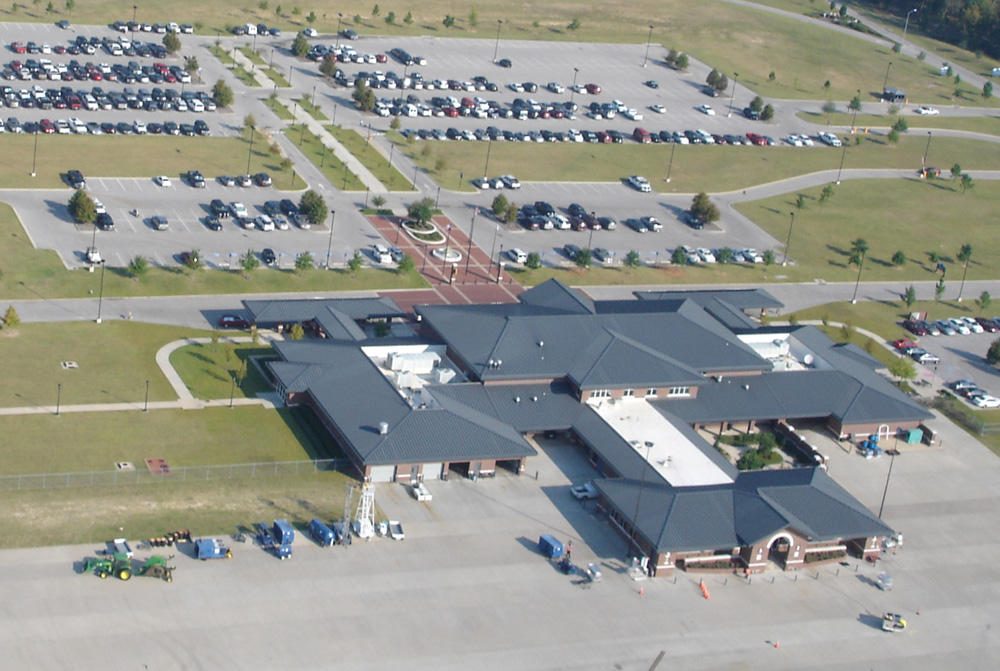
Aerial photo of Tyler Pounds Regional Airport

The most common form of transportation is the motor vehicle. Tyler is a nexus of several major highways. Interstate 20 runs along the north edge of the city going east and west, U.S. Highway 69 runs north–south through the center of town and State Highway 64 runs east–west through the city. Tyler also has access to U.S. Highway 271, State Highway 31, State Highway 155, and State Highway 110. Loop 323 was established in 1957 and encircles the city, which has continued to grow outside of this loop. Loop 49 is a limited access "outer loop" around the city and currently runs from State Highway 110 south of Tyler to US 69 northwest of Tyler near Lindale. Loop 124 is 1.524 mi (2.453 km) in length.

=== Public transportation ===
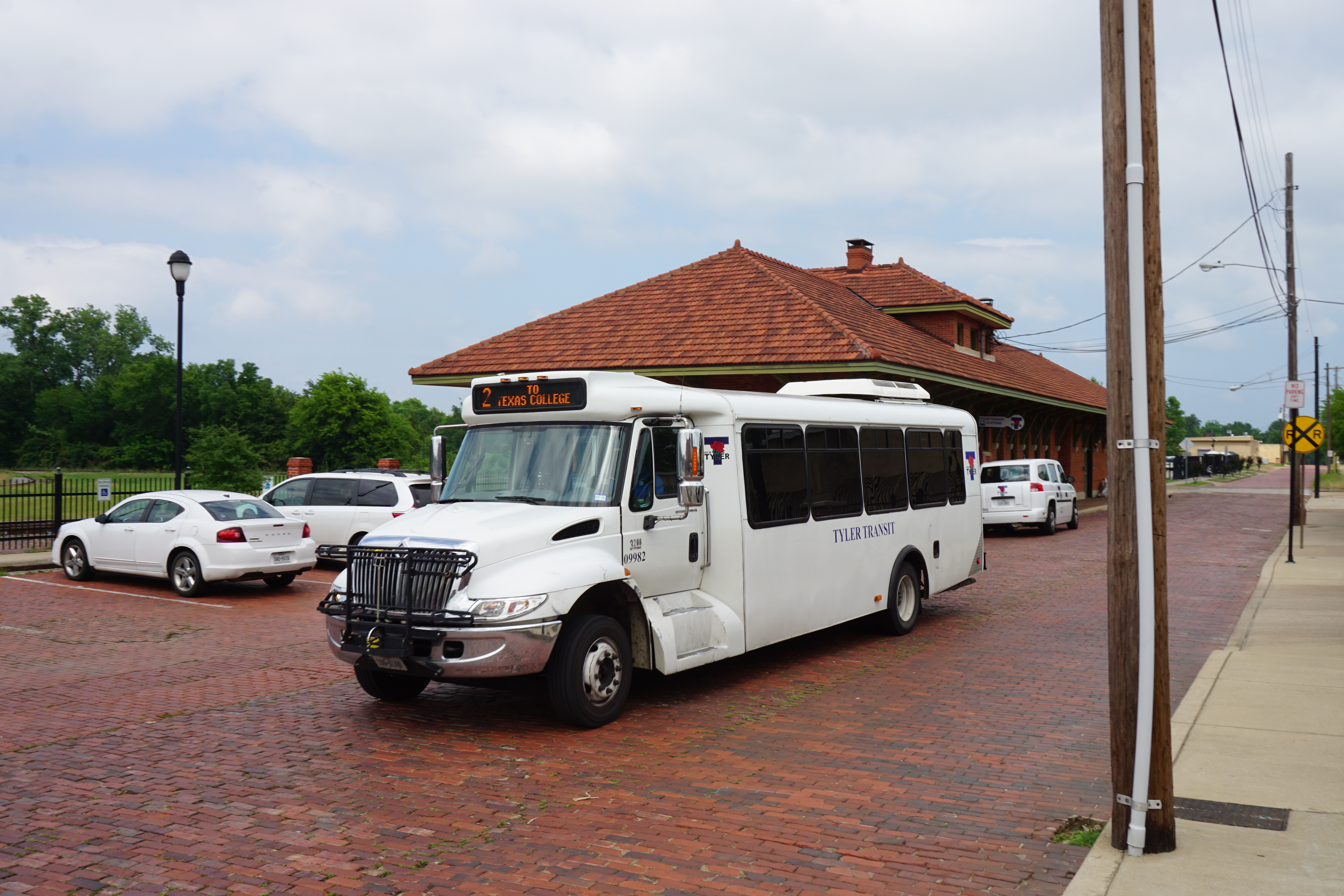
Tyler Transit shuttle

Tyler Transit provides customers with public transportation service within the City of Tyler. The buses run daily, excluding Sundays and holidays. Tyler Transit offers customers the option to purchase tickets, tokens, or passes at the Tyler Transit office, at 210 E. Oakwood Street inside the Cotton Belt Railroad Depot at the main transfer point. The City of Tyler paratransit service is a shared-ride, public transportation service. Requests for service must be made the day before the service is needed. Trips can be scheduled up to 14 days in advance. ADA compliant paratransit service is provided to all origins and destinations within the service area defined as the city limits of Tyler. Greyhound Lines bus service is available through a downtown terminal.

=== Air ===
Tyler Pounds Regional Airport offers service to and from Dallas–Fort Worth International Airport via American Eagle, providing service with Embraer ERJ-135 and ERJ-145 and CRJ-700 regional jets. General Aviation services are provided by two fixed-base operators, Johnson Aviation and the Jet Center of Tyler.

=== Train ===
Tyler was the hub for a series of short-line railroads which later evolved into the St. Louis Southwestern Railway, better known as "The Cotton Belt Route", with the city last being a stop on the unnamed successor to the Morning Star between St. Louis and Dallas. This line later became part of the Southern Pacific Railroad, which itself merged with the Union Pacific Railroad, which continues to serve the city today with freight traffic. No passenger train service to Tyler has occurred since April 1956, but Amtrak's Texas Eagle runs through the city of Mineola, a short distance north of Tyler.

=== Walkability ===
A 2014 study by Walk Score ranked Tyler with a walkability score of 32 (out of 100) with some amenities within walking distance.

== Notable events ==
- Fragments of the Space Shuttle Columbia landed near Tyler in 2003, following its breakup in the atmosphere.
- On the evening of February 2, 2009, a fire engulfed a number of historic buildings in downtown Tyler. Eight different fire departments responded to the fire.
- The 1982 Supreme Court case Plyler v. Doe, which prohibited denial of schooling to immigrant children, originated in the Tyler Independent School District.
- The Tyler courthouse shooting occurred in 2005, when David Arroyo fatally shot his ex-wife and a man in the Tyler Square inside the Smith County Courthouse.

== Sister cities ==
Tyler's sister cities are:

- Lo Barnechea, Chile
- Jelenia Góra, Poland
- Liberia, Costa Rica
- San Miguel de Allende, Mexico
- Yachiyo, Japan

Formerly :

- Metz, France (1983-1986)

== See also ==
- Cotton Belt Depot Train Museum
- List of museums in East Texas
- Tyler Museum of Art
- Whitaker-McClendon House
