= Caldwell Zoo =

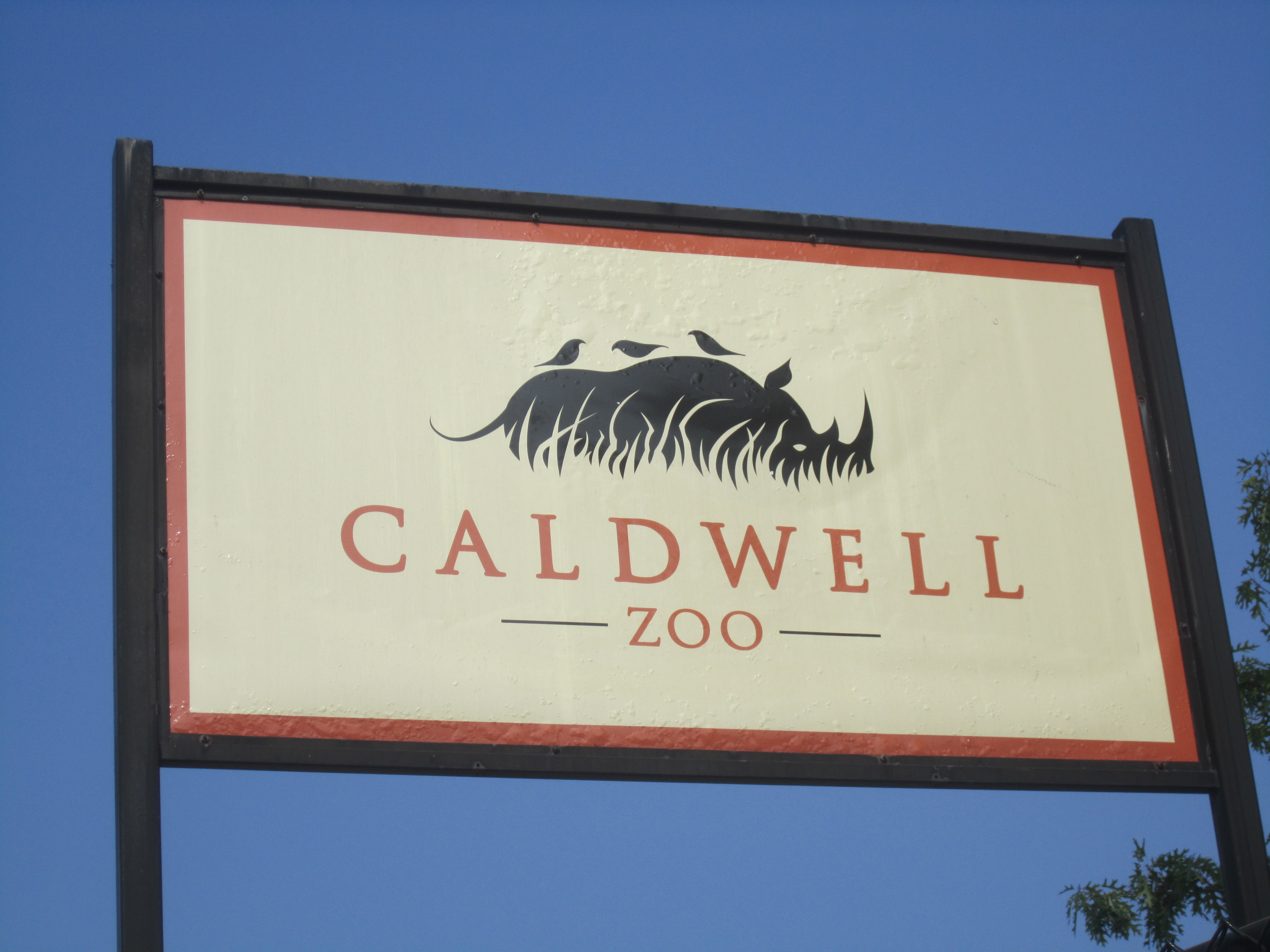
- Logo

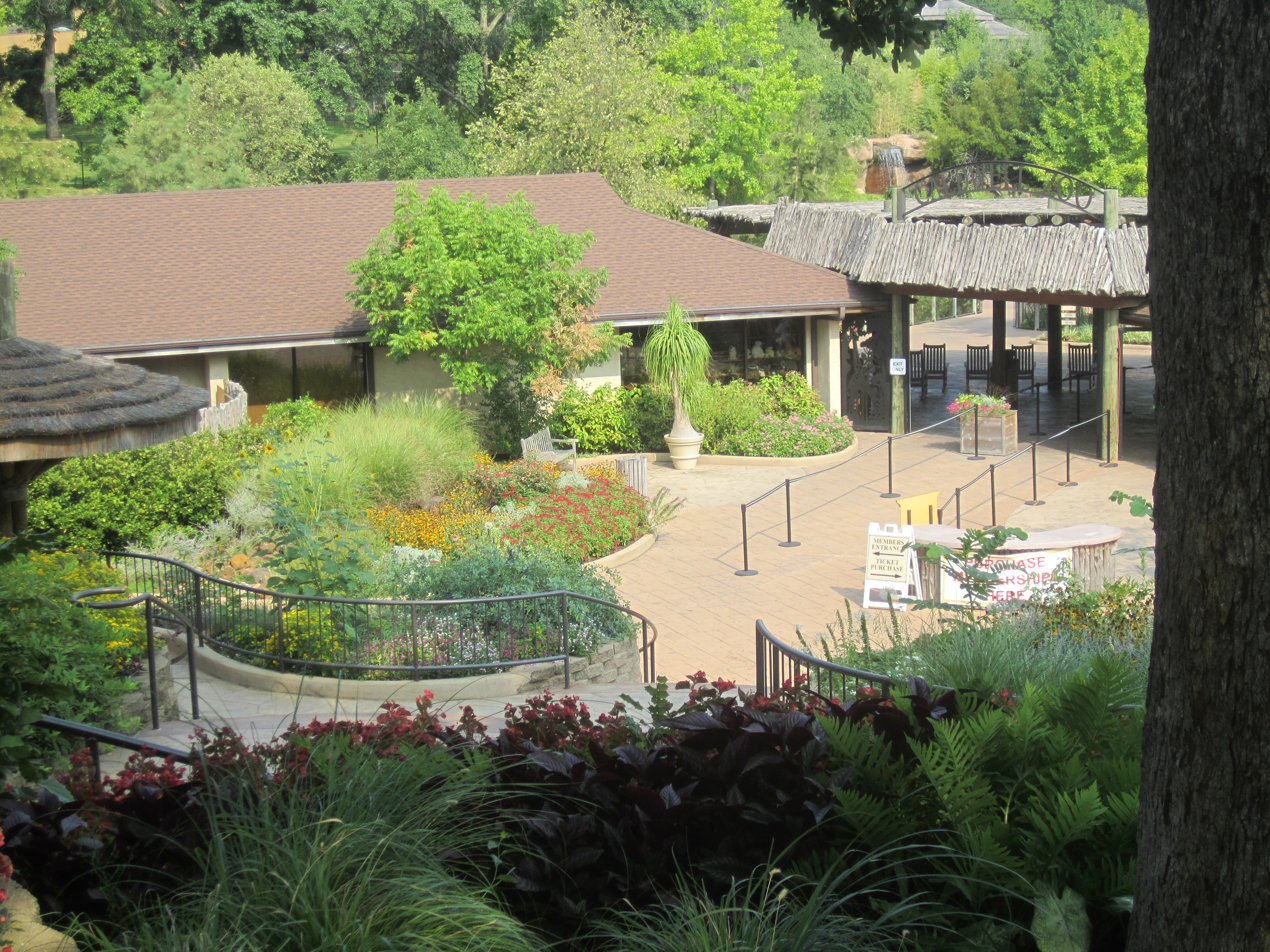
- Front entrance
- Interactive map of Caldwell Zoo
- 32.3704°N 95.3268°W
- Date opened: 1953
- Location: Tyler, Texas
- Land area: 85 acres (34 ha)
- No. of animals: 2,000
- Memberships: AZA, WAZA
- Website: caldwellzoo.org

The Caldwell Zoo is an 85-acre (34 ha) zoo located in the city of Tyler, Texas. It features animals from all over the world. The Caldwell Zoo is a zoological park that aims to educate the public and cultivate an appreciation for wildlife. Established over 70 years ago, it exhibits a collection of animal species from around the world.

The Caldwell Zoo is accredited by the Association of Zoos and Aquariums (AZA) and is a member of the World Association of Zoos and Aquariums (WAZA).

== History ==
The zoo had its origins in the Child Development Laboratory, which was started in 1937 and was operated by the Hogg Foundation and the American Association of University Women of Tyler. It was run by David King Caldwell and his wife, who brought in many animals for the enjoyment of the children.

The zoo was officially opened on its current site in 1953. By 1967, the zoo featured over 500 animals from 87 different species. In 1970, the zoo was broken into, and several animals were killed. This prompted the children of the area to collect money to help restore things. Enough money was raised for the zoo to acquire an African elephant and was the catalyst to modernize the entire zoo. The city granted an additional 40 acres (16 ha) to the zoo in 1976, and a large, long-term expansion project was undertaken. A new elephant enclosure was built, and giraffes were added in 1978. In 1983 a 15-acre (6.1 ha) native Texas area was opened, and in 1984 reptile and aquarium sections were opened. In 1987 major reconstruction of the African exhibits was completed, creating large pasture areas and an overlook. Throughout the 90s, more improvements were added. In 2002, a new veterinary hospital was completed, along with brooding areas, and a quarantine facility. The zoo now houses a "Wild Bird Walkabout" featuring over 400 parakeets and cockatiels. Bird, otter and penguin presentations have also expanded, allowing for the further education of the public.

Two white tigers, Meka and Willie King, were traded from the Alexandria Zoo in Louisiana in 2007 and have now been declared permanent displays, though they were originally only supposed to stay until the beginning of September 2007.

== Breeding ==
As a member of the AZA, the Caldwell Zoo participates in many breeding projects. Animals born at the zoo include reticulated giraffes, flamingoes, black rhinoceros, jaguars, giant anteaters, and many others. The zoo also participated in the first cheetah born through artificial insemination. African penguins are now being bred as well and will probably have young as soon as the currently owned penguins reach sexual maturity.

Under one of these AZA breeding programs, the zoo had a litter of four lion cubs born in January 2014. It is the first time in 20 years that the zoo has had a litter of lion cubs.
