= Julie V. Philley =

American academic administrator and pulmonologist

6th President of the University of Texas at Tyler
- Incumbent
- Assumed office June 1, 2024
- Preceded by: Kirk Calhoun

Personal details
- Born: Julia Vallery Philley Overton, Texas, U.S.
- Education: Texas Woman's University (BSN); McGovern Medical School (MD)
- Medical career
- Profession: Pulmonologist; academic administrator
- Field: Critical care, internal, and pulmonary medicine
- Institutions: University of Texas Southwestern Medical Center; UT Health East Texas; University of Texas at Tyler

Julia "Julie" Vallery Philley is an American academic administrator and pulmonologist who is the sixth president of University of Texas at Tyler and the first woman to lead the university.

== Life ==
Philley was born in Overton, Texas. She earned a bachelor's degree from Texas Woman's University. She received a M.D. from McGovern Medical School. She completed an internal medicine residiency at Johns Hopkins School of Medicine and Sinai Hospital. Philley conducted a fellowship at University of Texas Southwestern Medical Center.

In 2012, Philley became an assistant professor at UT Health East Texas. She researches nontuberculous mycobacteria and bronchiectasis. She later chaired the department of medicine at The Health Science Center at UT Tyler. Philley was the executive vice president for health affairs at the University of Texas at Tyler and became its vice provost in 2022. On June 1, 2024, she become the president of UT Tyler, succeeding Kirk A. Calhoun.
