= Sidecar (disambiguation) =

A sidecar is a one-wheeled device attached to the side of a motorcycle, scooter, or bicycle. Sidecar may also refer to:

== Beverages ==
- Sidecar (cocktail), an alcoholic drink
- Sidecar (sparkling water), a small glass of sparkling water served with an espresso; or an item served beside a drink, such as a snack or an extra drink.

== Computing ==
- Sidecar (Apple), an Apple technology for Mac computers
- Amiga Sidecar, an expansion hardware device for the Amiga 1000 personal computer
- Sidecar file, a computer file format
- Sidecar pattern, a software design pattern

== Other uses ==
- Sidecar Health, an American health insurance company
- Sidecar (company), a defunct transportation network company that was based in San Francisco
- Reinsurance sidecar, a type of insurance
- Blackburn Sidecar, an early aircraft
- Sidecar TT, a motorcycle sidecar road race
- The U.S. Forest Service calls side-by-sides sidecars.
