= Welsh, Carson, Anderson & Stowe =

American private equity firm

- Type: Limited liability company
- Industry: Private equity
- Founded: 1979; 47 years ago
- Founder: Patrick Welsh; Russell Carson; Bruce Anderson; Rick Stowe
- Headquarters: New York, New York, United States
- Key people: Anthony de Nicola (President & Managing Partner); D. Scott Mackesy (Managing Partner); Jon Rather (CFO/COO)
- Products: Leveraged buyout and Growth capital
- Total assets: US$27 billion
- Number of employees: 90
- Website: www.welshcarson.com

Welsh, Carson, Anderson & Stowe (WCAS), also referred to as Welsh Carson, is a private equity firm. WCAS was formed in 1979 and focuses on investing the industries of technology and healthcare, primarily in the United States. WCAS has a current portfolio of approximately 30 companies and has organized 17 limited partnerships with total capital of over $27 billion, consisting of 13 equity partnerships and four subordinated debt partnerships. WCAS is currently investing equity funds, including WCAS XII, L.P. and WCAS XIII, L.P.

WCAS has approximately 90 employees, including 15 general partners. The firm also has a Resources Group, which is composed of approximately 20 operating partners. The Resources Group assists the firm's portfolio companies by identifying and implementing initiatives focused on growth and operational improvement. The Resources Group works with the firm's investment professionals and portfolio company management teams to develop value maximization plans ("VMPs") for each new investment. These VMPs are unique for each portfolio company and encompass a wide range of strategic initiatives, including revenue enhancement and cost management strategies, corporate governance, motivation of key management team members, financial reporting dashboards, as well as potential acquisitions and integration timelines.

== History ==
WCAS was formed in 1979 by three founders, Patrick Welsh, Russell Carson, and Bruce Anderson. Patrick Welsh and Russ Carson had previously served as president and Chairman of Citicorp Venture Capital. Bruce Anderson was formerly Executive Vice President of Automatic Data Processing. WCAS was originally a venture capital firm, and WCAS's first Equity Partnership totaled $33 million in commitments. In 1979, Richard Stowe joined WCAS as a General Partner, having worked previously at New Court Securities Corporation, now Rothschild Inc.

WCAS has been in business for over four decades, having raised over US$27 billion of capital as of 2019 in 13 equity partnerships and four subordinated debt partnerships. Of the total capital raised, US$8 billion has been devoted to the healthcare sector. WCAS has 15 General Partners, who work in New York and San Francisco offices.

In 2018, WCAS was fined by the Securities and Exchange Commission (SEC) for a conflict of interest involving receipt of professional services fees between 2012 and 2016.

Also in 2018, WCAS began development of a government services platform.

== Leadership ==
As of 2019, Anthony (Tony) de Nicola is the President and a Managing Partner of WCAS, and serves as a member of the Management Committee. He focuses on the information/business and communications industry. de Nicola joined WCAS in 1994, becoming a General Partner the same year, after working in the Mergers and Acquisitions Department of Goldman Sachs. He received an MBA from Harvard Business School in 1990.

In addition to de Nicola, the other Managing Partner of the firm is D. Scott Mackesy, also a member of the firm's Management Committee. Mackesy co-leads the firm's healthcare practice. Mackesy received a BBA from The College of William & Mary in 1991 and joined WCAS in 1998, becoming a General Partner in 2001.

== Portfolio investments ==
There are 40 current or former public companies in WCAS's two core industries that can trace their roots to the firm. The combined market capitalization of these companies exceeds $100 billion.

=== Technology sector ===
- Absorb Software
- Alert Logic
- Alliance Data Systems
- American Residential
- Avetta—WCAS acquired a majority stake in the firm from Northwest Venture Partners in 2018. Northwest retained a minority stake, and TCV at the same time acquired a minority stake. Avetta is a risk management software vendor based in Irvine, California.
- BISYS Group
- Card Establishment Services
- Ceridian
- Clearwater Analytics—This is a financial technology firm that provides software as a service offerings.
- Cohesive Network Systems
- Decision One
- Centennial Communications Corp.
- DriveCam
- Electronic Evidence Discovery
- General Computer Corporation—Company based in Twinsburg, Ohio producing health care computer systems, acquired by GenCC, a WACS fully owned subsidiary, in 1994. The initial action in 1994 was the purchase of a sub-majority stake which would be followed by full acquisition through purchase of all outstanding shares. General Computer had been traded on the NASDAQ exchange under ticker symbol GCCC, but the 1994 sale took the company private.
- GlobalCollect
- Global Knowledge Network
- Green Street Advisors – research, data and analytics company acquired from Golden Gate Capital in July 2019 for an undisclosed amount.
- JCPenney Business Services—In 1996, WACS acquired this subsidiary of J. C. Penney which provided credit services and electronic network transaction processing.
- MedE America
- Mobile Mini (Nasdaq:MINI)
- NEWAsurion
- Ozburn-Hessey Logistics
- Paycom—As of 2014, WCAS held a majority stake in the firm's outstanding stock. The company's decision to go public was in part to raise funds to repay loans provided by WCAS.
- Peak 10
- QwestDex—With The Carlyle Group, WCAS acquired the yellow pages directory unit from Qwest in 2002 through a competitive auction.
- QuickBase
- Retrievex
- Revel systems
- Ruesch International
- Service Repair Solutions
- Titan Outdoor Holdings
- TransFirst
- United Vision Logistics
- US Investigations Services
- Walsh International
- Windstream Yellow Pages—In 2006, Windstream spun out its directory publishing unit and arranged for its sale to WCAS, which completed in 2007.

==== Former holdings in technology ====
- Amdocs—WCAS at one time held as much as 35% of this firm. As of September 2003, WCAS had completed distributing all holdings in the firm to its partners, leaving it with no direct holdings.
- Bridge Information Systems—This company was acquired in 1995, after which the unit purchased a number of other companies, ultimately filing for bankruptcy in 2001, leading to the sale of its units to several entities, including Reuters.
- Windstream—In 2006, WCAS sold its 4.1% stake in this telecommunications company back to the company as part of its acquisition of Windstream Yellow Pages.

=== Healthcare sector ===
- Accredo Health
- Aptuit
- Ardent Health Services
- AGA Medical
- AmComp
- AmeriPath
- Bausch & Lomb
- CareSpot Express Healthcare
- Concentra
- Emerus Holdings Inc.
- Hawk Medical Supply
- K2M
- Kindred Healthcare —As part of a consortium including Humana and TPG Capital, WCAS acquired the company in 2018. The acquisition included Kindred's long term acute care hospitals, inpatient rehabilitation facilities and contract rehabilitation services, but did not include other parts of Kindred collectively referred to as Kindred at Home.
- LabOne
- Lincare Holdings (Nasdaq:LNCR)
- Matrix Medical Network
- MedAssets
- Medcath—With Kohlberg Kravis Roberts & Company, WCAS acquired the company in 1998.
- MemberHealth
- MultiPlan
- National Dentex
- NaviHealth
- Norstella
- Onward Healthcare
- Pediatrix Medical Group
- Quorum Health Group which was acquired by Triad Hospitals, Inc.
- Renal Advantage
- Select Medical Corporation (NYSE: SEM)
- SHPS
- Smile Brands
- Solstas Lab Partners
- Springstone
- United Surgical Partners International aka USPI—sold majority stake in 2015 for US$400 million, with plans to sell remainder by 2020.
- Universal American Financial (NYSE:UAM)
- U.S. Acute Care Solutions—launched by WCAS in 2015 as capital partner, in collaboration with Emergency Medicine Physicians, an Ohio-based concern. U.S. Acute Care Solutions acquired Ergentus Emergency Service Physicians of Denver in July 2016. Solutions had previously acquired Emergency Physicians at Porter Hospitals in Denver, Colorado; APEX Emergency Group in Colorado; MEP Health in Maryland; and Tampa Bay Emergency Physicians in Florida. Solutions is majority owned by the physicians of the concern.
- U.S. Anesthesia Partners aka USAP—WCAS became a major backer of this Fort Lauderdale, Florida-based concern in 2013. Partners acquired in July 2016 East Texas Anesthesiology Associates, aka ETAA, of Tyler, Texas, which president is Dr. Shawn Thomas.
- US Oncology
- US Radiology Specialists
- Valeritas
- Westminster Healthcare

== Investment funds ==
In July 2019, WCAS closed its 13th fund at $4.3 billion. Investors in the fund include the California State Teachers' Retirement System, the Minnesota State Board of Investment and the Board of Education Retirement System of the City of New York. Since its founding in 1979, WCAS has raised thirteen private equity funds and four mezzanine capital funds:

Private Equity

- 1979 – WCAS I ($33 million)
- 1980 – WCAS II ($32 million)
- 1983 – WCAS III ($81 million)
- 1985 – WCAS IV ($178 million)
- 1989 – WCAS V ($371 million)
- 1993 – WCAS VI ($604 million)
- 1995 – WCAS VII ($1.4 billion)
- 1998 – WCAS VIII ($3.0 billion)
- 2000 – WCAS IX ($3.8 billion)
- 2005 – WCAS X ($3.3 billion)
- 2008 – WCAS XI ($3.9 billion)
- 2015 – WCAS XII ($3.3 billion)
- 2018 – WCAS XIII ($4.3 billion)

Mezzanine Debt

- 1987 – WCAS Capital Partners ($209 million)
- 1990 – WCAS Capital Partners II ($354 million)
- 1997 – WCAS Capital Partners III ($1 billion)
- 2004 – WCAS Capital Partners IV ($1 billion)
