= Ardent Health =

American healthcare company

Ardent Health, Inc.
- Type: Public
- Founded: 1993
- Founder: Edward Stack
- Headquarters: Brentwood, Tennessee, United States
- Key people: Dave Caspers, CEO; Alfred Lumsdaine, CFO
- Owner: Equity Group Investments (54.0%); Pure Health (21.1%); Ventas (6.5%)
- Number of employees: 15,300
- Website: www.ardenthealth.com

Ardent Health, Inc., formerly known as Behavioral Healthcare Corporation is a for-profit healthcare company based in Brentwood, Tennessee, United States.

== History ==
The Behavioral Healthcare Corporation was founded in 1993 by Edward Stack. Until 2001, it was a privately held company owned by Kindred Healthcare and Welsh Carson Anderson & Stowe and several individual investors and focused owning and operating behavioral health facilities. It currently owns and operates hospitals in Tulsa, Oklahoma, Albuquerque, New Mexico, Amarillo, Texas, Pocatello, Idaho, Topeka, Kansas, 2 in New Jersey and, as of March 1, 2018, UTHET in Tyler, Texas.

By 2001, the private equity firm Welsh, Carson, Anderson & Stowe became majority shareholders and changed the name of the company.

The company sold its behavioral health operations to Psychiatric Solutions, Inc. in 2005.

In 2015, Ventas acquired the company for $1.75b through a traditional sale-leaseback transaction where Ventas remained the owner of essentially all of Ardent's real property interests while a joint venture between Equity Group Investments, Ventas and several members of management acquired its hospital operations.

In February 2018, Ardent Health Services acquired the East Texas Medical Center (ETMC) hospital system, and created the Tyler Regional Hospital, LLC, purchased the name-rights of the University of Texas Health Sciences Brand, and created a Doing-Business-As name of "UT Health Tyler." Tyler Regional Hospital, LLC continues operating under the UT Health Brand but is not currently under the University of Texas umbrella of administration. Currently, the University of Texas system owns a 30% share in the hospital while Ardent Health owns a 70% share.

In February 2020, Ardent Health Services president and CEO David T. Vandewater announced his plans to retire from the company. He remained president and CEO until a successor was named.

In August 2020, Ardent Health Services appointed Martin J. Bonick as president and CEO. Today the company has 26,000 employees, 30 hospitals, and over 200 sites of care in six states.

In January, the company sold HealthFirst, its third-party administrator, to American health care company Imagine360.
