= Benefis Health System =

American nonprofit health care system

- Type: Nonprofit
- Industry: Health care
- Founded: 1996
- Headquarters: Great Falls, Montana, United States
- Area served: North-Central Montana
- Key people: John Goodnow (CEO); Steve Ballock (CFO)
- Revenue: $5.9 million (2009)
- Net income: -$1.1 million (2009)
- Number of employees: 3200
- Website: http://www.benefis.org

Benefis Health System is a nonprofit independent health care system based in the city of Great Falls in the state of Montana in the United States. The system owns 516-bed Benefis Hospital, Sletten Cancer Institute, Benefis Mercy Flight (a fixed-wing and helicopter emergency medical evacuation service), 146-bed Benefis Extended Care Center (for both rehabilitation and long-term nursing care), 12-bed Peace Hospice of Montana, Benefis Quick Care (an ambulatory care facility), and Benefis Physician Associates. As of March 2011, it was Montana's largest hospital.

== Formation ==
The forerunner of Benefis Health System was Benefis Healthcare. Benefis Healthcare was formed when 145-bed Columbus Hospital (a Catholic Church-owned hospital founded in 1892) and 339-bed Montana Deaconess Medical Center (a hospital founded in 1898 by the Methodist Episcopal Church) merged in July 1996. The two hospitals first considered merging in 1994, but a traditional merger was held up by prolonged disagreements (which lasted 20 months) with state and federal antitrust officials over the legality of the merger.

The hospitals finally merged in July 1996 under a so-called "certificate of public advantage" (COPA), a provision in Montana state antitrust law which permitted hospitals to merge prior to examination of the merger under state antitrust laws, provided that the state issued a certification that the merger met public need (the COPA) and further provided that the merging hospitals agreed to certain conditions imposed by the state. The U.S. Federal Trade Commission dropped its objections to the merger after the COPA was signed. Columbus and Deaconess hospitals were the first hospitals in the United States to merge under a state COPA statute. The name "Benefis" was chosen because, although it was not a word found in any dictionary, it sounded similar to words such as beneficence, beneficial, and benefit.

A number of conditions on the merger were required by both state and federal governments. These included a limit on excess revenues ("profits"), that $86 million in cost savings be passed on to consumers, and a prohibition on certain anti-competitive behaviors. Another restriction prohibited Benefis from entering into any joint ventures which would permit existing services to be transferred to the joint venture (thus enabling Benefis to skirt the COPA agreement).

The merged entity was originally named Benefis Healthcare.

== Corporate history ==
Just a year after its formation, Benefis challenged the construction of specialty surgical centers in Great Falls. Both the Central Montana Surgery Center (an ambulatory care facility founded in 1996 by local Great Falls businessman Harold Poulsen) and the Great Falls Clinic (a physician-owned group practice founded in 1917) announced they intended to build outpatient surgery centers in the city. The Clinic had explored building its center as a joint venture with Benefis, but the COPA agreement prohibited it. Both companies sought a certificate of need (CON) for their surgery centers, but Benefis challenged these filings. Both companies then altered their plans, saying they would build specialty surgical centers instead (as permission was not needed under the state's CON law). The state subsequently approved both plans. Benefis filed suit in state district court as well as filed a protest with the state over the decision not to seek a certificate of need for either proposed facility.

In late December 1997, Benefis, Central Montana Surgery Center, and the Great Falls Clinic agreed to settle their differences out of court and to drop their administrative dispute with the state of Montana. Central Montana Surgery Center and the Great Falls Clinic agreed to abandon plans to build surgical hospitals and to build outpatient surgery centers instead. Benefis agreed to close its own outpatient surgery center, and become a 49 percent owner in the Clinic's center. The Montana State Attorney General's office, which approved the settlement, said Benefis would be permitted to charge the costs of closing its center to the $86 million in cost savings owed to the community.

Benefis reported excess revenues of $7 million on income of $140 million in 1997. In early 1999, Benefis announced it was suffering serious financial losses that were imperiling its ability to provide health care. In January 1999, the company reported a loss of $3 million on revenues of $128 million in 1998, and projected a doubling of that loss in 1999 with no appreciable growth in revenues. Benefis claimed its COPA agreement did not account for the costs of consummating the merger of Columbus and Deaconess hospitals, and did not provide for adjustments to the agreement in the event competition forced changes to its business plan. The company cut costs by $17 million, saw construction costs increase by $17 million, and had not yet implemented any staff reductions. Benefis predicted losses totaling $25.7 million by 2003 unless changes to the COPA were made. After two months of negotiations, the state amended the COPA to allow Benefis to raise prices faster than originally permitted (generating $12 million in revenues), and reduce cost savings returned to the community by $39.5 million. The term of the COPA (its initial terms were to end in 2006) was not changed.

In January 2000, Benefis reported that it had generated $9.1 million in excess revenues in 1999 because of the changes. The company also doubled its charity care expenditures from $2 million to $4.8 million, inpatient prices were 6 percent lower than pre-merger prices, and outpatient prices were 15 percent lower than pre-merger prices. That same year, Benefis received a $7 million gift from a group of anonymous donors, permitting it to build a 25,000 square feet (2,300 m^{2}) hospice (now known as Peace Hospice) near its east campus. In August 2000, Benefis signed an agreement with Treasure State Healthcare Network, an independent practice association (IPA) representing about 30 percent of the physicians practicing in Great Falls. The agreement created a 50-50 for-profit partnership which marketed Benefis and the IPA to large employers and health care trusts.

Despite these changes, Benefis faced continuing financial pressures. The company had excess revenues of $3.3 million in 2000, but said it would only break even in 2001. It sought a second revision to the COPA agreement, but the state refused to reopen the terms.

In 2001, Benefis again sought state permission to revise the terms of the COPA. That year, Harold Poulsen, owner of Central Montana Surgery Center, announced he would build a 20-bed, 24,000-square-foot (2,200 m^{2}), $5.3 million inpatient specialty surgical hospital (to be called Central Montana Surgical Hospital). (Instead, Poulsen ended up transforming his existing outpatient center into a hospital.) Benefis sought to reopen the COPA before Poulsen's announcement, but its pleas became more urgent after the competitor's plans were announced. But once more the state turned down the request.

In October 2005, Benefis sought to disaffiliate from Providence Services. A dispute between the local health system and its parent organization first arose in 2003, when Providence Services asked Benefis to change its corporate constitution and bylaws to permit the parent organization to veto any joint venture that the local system might enter into, review and veto capital spending plans, and power to reject any chief executive officer the system might attempt to hire. Benefis refused, and in 2004 Providence Services declined to issue a corporate bond that would have financed construction of a new cancer center in Great Falls. According to Standard & Poor's, a bond rating agency, Benefis contributed 16 percent of Providence Services' total assets, 17 percent of its operating revenues, and 30 percent of its net operating income. In the last week of December 2005, Benefis opened its $20 million Sletten Cancer Institute.

In early 2006, Benefis sought to stop the Great Falls Clinic from purchasing 20-bed Central Montana Surgical Hospital. The clinic had partnered with Essentia Health, a non-profit healthcare system based in Minnesota and North Dakota, to purchase Harold Poulsen's outstanding stock in Central Montana Surgical Hospital and gain a controlling interest in the surgical hospital. Benefis sued to prevent the transaction, arguing that the new owners intended to run the facility as a specialty hospital in contravention of a 2005 state law banning further construction of these types of facilities and that the Clinic and Essentia did not apply for the required health care facility license. The health system won a temporary restraining order. Benefis also said it stood to lose $4 million a year in revenues if Central Montana Surgical Hospital was licensed as a general hospital. The company said it would likely close its renal dialysis unit, suspend Mercy Flights, shutter its nursing home, and end outpatient psychiatric and chemical dependency services. Benefis also said it would lose several million dollars a year in federal payments as well. On March 24, the injunction was lifted. Benefis filed an emergency motion with the Montana Supreme Court three days later, appealing the district court's ruling. The state of Montana then issued a six-month provisional license to Central Montana to operate as a general hospital. But on October 4, 2006, the Montana Supreme Court ruled 4-to-3 to uphold the district court's dismissal of the temporary injunction. However, the state supreme court declined to rule on other issues raised by Benefis' lawsuit, and left open the door for the company to continue litigation in the district courts. On November 6, 2006, Benefis declined to appeal the high court's ruling and said it would not bring the other issues back to the district court. In February 2007, the Clinic sued Benefis to recover its legal fees. A state judge ruled in September 2007 that Benefis must pay these fees.

Also in 2006, the Clinic bought out Benefis' 49 percent ownership in the Great Falls Clinic Surgery Center.

Benefis also began a number of construction projects in 2006. It began work on an 80,000-square-foot (7,400 m^{2}), three-story, $14 million medical office building and 22 private rooms in the old Deaconess building at a cost of $4 million. Benefis also consolidated its rehabilitation and physical therapy units into one space at its east campus, and moved its skilled nursing unit to its west campus. It moved the Montana Orthopedic, Neurologic and Rehabilitative Care Center (MONARC) sports injury center and its behavioral health unit into the old nursing home space, expanded its emergency room waiting area, and remodeled its pediatric unit. In January 2006, Benefis partnered with Diversified Clinical Services to open the Benefis Wound Care and Hyperbaric Medicine Center, the only like it in the state of Montana at the time. In August 2006, Benefis' Sletten Cancer Institute added a CyberKnife nuclear radiosurgery system for treating tumors and other medical conditions (at the time, making Benefis the only hospital to own a cyberknife in the Idaho, Montana, Oregon, Washington, and Wyoming areas).

Benefis' separation from Providence Services was finalized on September 30, 2006. Benefis was forced to make a donation of $10 million to cover goodwill, and repay loans made to the company by Providence Services. Both the Vatican and the Montana Attorney General's Office approved the disaffiliation. The company said it saved $100,000 a month in corporate overhead costs, although it incurred an equal amount of cost because it now had higher interest payments on its debt. The same year, Benefis founded the Northcentral Montana Healthcare Alliance, a consortium of 14 hospitals and long-term care facilities whose goal was to promote the general economic well-being of its member institutions. Benefis also gave Cascade County 3.5 acres (1.4 ha) near on Benefis Court in exchange for 2.6 acres (1.1 ha) of land near 15th Avenue South and 25th Street in September 2006. A month later, the United States Department of Agriculture's Rural Development grant program awarded $380,000 to Northcentral Montana Healthcare Alliance to expand telehealth throughout the area, a grant which was matched by a $700,000 grant from Benefis.

On February 7, 2007, a Benefis Mercy Flight Beechcraft Super King Air 200 twin-engine fixed-wing aircraft crashed a short distance from Gallatin Field Airport (near Bozeman, Montana) around 9 p.m., killing the pilot, a registered nurse, and a paramedic. Members of the victims' families contended the contractor which operated the flight, Metro Aviation, failed to adhere to safety and training procedures. In June 2007, Metro Aviation reached a confidential, out-of-court settlement with the family of paramedic Paul Erickson. In April 2009, the family of nurse Darcy Dengel also reached an out-of-court settlement with Metro Aviation.

In March 2007, Benefis and the Great Falls Clinic began exploring ways to collaborate in cardiac care. These talks continued for two years, and expanded to include discussions that included Benefis buying the Clinic outright. But although the talks continued into February 2010, the Clinic eventually rejected the confidential purchase price and terms offered by Benefis.

2008 saw Benefis expand even further. It opened its new Hi-Line Sletten Cancer Center in Havre in August. The same month, it partnered with the 10-physician Great Falls Orthopedic Associates to break ground on the $17 million, 72,000 square feet (6,700 m^{2}) Orthopedic Center of Montana, an ambulatory and outpatient surgical center offering physical therapy, sports medicine, and urgent care services. The new building permitted Benefis Quick Care, an existing urgent care center, to move into larger quarters on the health system's west campus. In December, Benefis began construction, cost, and marketing studies aimed at building a continuous-case retirement community on 60 acres (24 ha) south of its east campus. The first phase of the project (which would replace its traditional nursing home, built in the early 1980s) would construct several seven-to-10 person cottages over a four-year period to provide long-term nursing care, dining facilities, and recreation. The company said it intended to build an independent and assisted living facilities as well. Ground was broken on the first phase of this project in November 2010.

In 2009, Republican Congressman Denny Rehberg secured federal spending earmarks for Benefis that included $300,000 to subsidize construction of the pediatric care areas, $900,000 for the cardiac care suites in the new tower, and $143,000 for electronic medical recordkeeping and telehealth.

Benefis began construction of a $17 million, four-story, 79,000 square feet (7,300 m^{2}) medical office building next to the Orthopedic Center of Montana on its east campus in August 2010. The building was intended to house Benefis Medical Group (formerly called Benefis Physician Associates), a group of 53 physicians and 18 other healthcare providers the health system created in late 2007. In September of that year, it also outsourced its medical records functions to Precyse, a medical records transcription, coding, and filing company in Pennsylvania.

In April 2011, Benefis announced it would build a $5.5 million, 40-unit low-income housing project for senior citizens. The health care company sought housing tax credits from the Montana Board of Housing for the project (only the third time since 1996 that such credits had been sought for a project in Great Falls). Benefis said Mountain Plains Equity Group of Billings would invest in the project as well, which would be built on 3 acres (1.2 ha) next to its existing 66-acre (27 ha) senior campus (under construction at the time). The project, to be called The Grandview at Benefis, would break ground in fall 2011. Benefis also said that the cost of its long-term care cottages and assisted living housing, which began construction in November 2010, would be about $21.5 million. The cost of the independent living housing had not yet been determined, but would break ground in 2012. This second phase, Benefis said, would now include 33 stand-alone homes as well.

Benefis also said in April 2011 that it would spend $3.5 million to expand and renovate its Peak Health & Wellness facility, a for-profit joint venture with private investors.

== Ownership changes ==
Under the terms of the merger, Benefis affiliated with Providence Services, a Catholic-owned health care system based in Spokane, Washington, and founded by the Sisters of Providence. A local board of directors provided leadership and oversight for Benefis, although the Providence Services maintained some corporate control.

In July 2008, a holding company known as Benefis Health System was created to hold title to the growing variety of services offered.

=== Deregulation battle ===
The COPA permitting the merger of Columbus and Deaconess hospitals in 1996 was due to expire in 2006. However, the state had the option of renewing the agreement at that time, if the state believed not enough strong competition had emerged to keep Benefis from engaging in monopolistic behaviors.

In October 2006, Montana Attorney General Mike McGrath ruled that although some competition for certain services had emerged, not enough competition existed in enough areas to justify releasing Benefis from its obligations under the COPA. On December 3, citing internal studies which showed Benefis could lose $2.4 million a year due to competition, Benefis asked McGrath to reconsider his decision. McGrath declined to do so and said he would neither affirm or overturn his decision until the upcoming legislative session ended.

A legislative effort to repeal the COPA agreement began in January 2007. State Senator Jesse Laslovich, a Democrat from Anaconda, sponsored a bill that would limit COPA agreements to 10 years and which would make this limitation retroactive (so it would apply to the Benefis agreement). Benefis focused its lobbying efforts on prices, and pledged to keep its prices in the lower 50th percentile for large Montana hospitals. At legislative hearings in the state senate, more than 20 individuals testified for three and a half hours about the merits of the bill. The bill passed the state senate by a vote of 39-to-11. The state house passed the bill 93-to-6 on March 20.

On April 2, 2007, Montana Governor Brian Schweitzer signed the legislation ending state oversight of Benefis through the COPA process.

Benefis said in 2008 that it saved $300,000 to $600,000 a year in interest rate payments on its bonds after being freed from the COPA requirements. It also saw another $120,000 a year in savings by no longer having to engage in COPA reporting and oversight, or for reimbursing the state for COPA oversight.

However, in early 2011, representatives from school employee health care trust funds, nursing associations, community health clinics, and others accused Benefis of raising prices 16 percent in 2010 and 30 percent overall since removal of the COPA agreement. But Benefis also said its costs fell 2 percent in the 2008-2009 period, and another 8 percent in 2010. Benefis denied the accusation, saying the 16 percent figure was overstated because much of that number came from a discontinuation of health care price breaks the health system used to provide. Benefis officials also said their charges for inpatient care were still 2.6 percent below those of its peers, while charges for outpatient service were 29.2 percent lower. Benefis also said it would implement no price increase in 2011, and hoped to reduce costs another 5.2 percent.

== Market size and economic impact ==
In 2006, two-thirds of all Benefis patients came from Cascade County, Montana, with the remainder coming from the remaining counties in north-central Montana. The region is five times the size of the state of New Jersey.

Benefis has more of an economic impact on the city of Great Falls than any other industry or employer. In 2008, it was the north-central Montana region's largest private employer.

As of 2008, Benefis was considered the "sole community provider" by the Centers for Medicare and Medicaid Services, which resulted in a $1.5 million annual federal payment to the health system. If total hospital admissions at any other healthcare facility in the community rises above 8 percent, Benefis would be required to share that payment equally with the other provider(s). The same year, Benefis said Medicare patients accounted for 48 percent of the health system's admissions, but contributed only 40 percent of its revenues. Patients with private insurance represented 26 percent of admissions but accounted for 40 percent of revenues. Benefis said that it lost money on its dialysis, emergency room, and inpatient mental health services.

Benefis Health System was the largest hospital in Montana as of March 2011.

== Cardiac services ==
In July 2005, Benefis announced it was partnering with MedCath Corp. to construct an $11 million cardiac hospital on its east campus. MedCath owned 49 percent of the cardiac hospital, and had the option to invest in the physical property as well.

The tower was originally expected to cost $50 million, but by mid-2006 the cost had risen to a "staggering" $75.2 million. Construction on the now seven-story medical tower began in September 2006. Although only a year had passed since announcement of the MedCath deal, the tower's purpose had radically changed. Benefis said the tower, which would have 88 private rooms and connect with the operating room tower and medical building via an existing skyway, would provide space for obstetrics, neonatal intensive care, and pediatrics in addition to cardiology. The new medical tower opened on August 25, 2009, at a final cost of $85 million. Private donations paid for $3.5 million of the cost, while federal earmarks contributed another $1.2 million.

== Charity care ==
In 2008, a report on the amount of public benefit hospitals returned to the community, released by the Montana Attorney General's office, said that Benefis ranked eighth out of 11 hospitals in the state. The report said Benefis received $7.5 million in tax breaks in 2006, but donated less than $4.7 million in charity care. Benefis disagreed with the report, noting that the document says the company broke even on Medicaid but that the hospital actually lost $3.2 million on providing the service. If the correct figure were used, Benefis officials said, the health system would have ranked fifth.

The following year, the Attorney General's office reported that Benefis received $5.7 million in tax exemptions in 2007. Although Benefis gave charity care to more people (4,082) in 2007 compared to 2006 (3,493), it donated $4.68 million in charity care (a decrease of $11,000 from the previous year).

By 2008, charity care constituted 2.95 percent of Benefis' operating budget (up from 1.5 percent in 2006). Based on the ratio of charity care to operating budget, Benefis ranked fourth-highest among nonprofit hospitals in the state.

== Accreditation ==
Since its founding, Benefis had been accredited by the Joint Commission on Accreditation of Healthcare Organizations (JCAHO) (which is now known as the Joint Commission). Under federal law and in most states, JCAHO accreditation was a condition of licensure and permitted a health care facility to receive Medicaid, Medicare, TRICARE, or Indian Health Service reimbursement. However, Section 125 of the Medicare Improvement for Patients and Providers Act of 2008 (MIPPA) changed JCAHO's accreditation authority. As of July 15, 2010, JCAHO had to seek approval from a federal agency, the Centers for Medicare & Medicaid (CMS), for it to retain its accrediting power. CMS was required under MIPPA to also permit at least two other accrediting agencies to "deem" healthcare facilities ready to receive federal healthcare funds, and to offer accreditation directly to healthcare facilities. As of 2011, the Joint Commission accredited 82 percent of the hospitals in the United States.

In January 2012, Benefis announced it would no longer seek accreditation by JCAHO, saving the hospital roughly $80,000 every three years. Benefis said it would seek direct accreditation from CMS, which was provided free of charge.

== Awards ==
Benefis has received numerous awards for its provision of health care. In 2005, HealthGrades (a company which ranks quality of care) listed Benefis as among the top 5 percent of hospitals in the nation for the quality of its care. In 2006, HealthGrades listed Benefis' cardiology and gastrointestinal services "number one" in Montana. HealthGrades also listed Benefis among the top 5 percent of hospitals in the country for the quality of its orthopedic services, and in the top 10 percent nationally for joint-replacement surgery and treatment of stroke. Benefis also won a Specialty Excellence Award recipient for its orthopedic, joint replacement, and stroke care. It also gave the hospital five-star ratings (for above-average patient outcomes) in the areas of bowel obstruction, pneumonia, respiratory failure, sepsis, and stroke. In 2006 and again in 2007, Benefis was once again listed in the top 5 percent of hospitals delivering high-quality health care.

In 2006, the American Society for Bariatric Surgery gave Benefis its Bariatric Surgery Center of Excellence designation, recognizing it for the quality of its care and the high percentage of positive patient outcomes.

The Sletten Cancer Institute received the Outstanding Achievement Award from the American College of Surgeons for the quality of its cancer care. It won the accolade a second time in 2008, one o only 66 cancer centers in the entire United States to achieve the honor.

== Bibliography ==
- American Bar Association. State Antitrust Enforcement Handbook. Chicago, Ill.: American Bar Association, 2003.
