= Jan Sundell =

Swedish Professor in Building Science

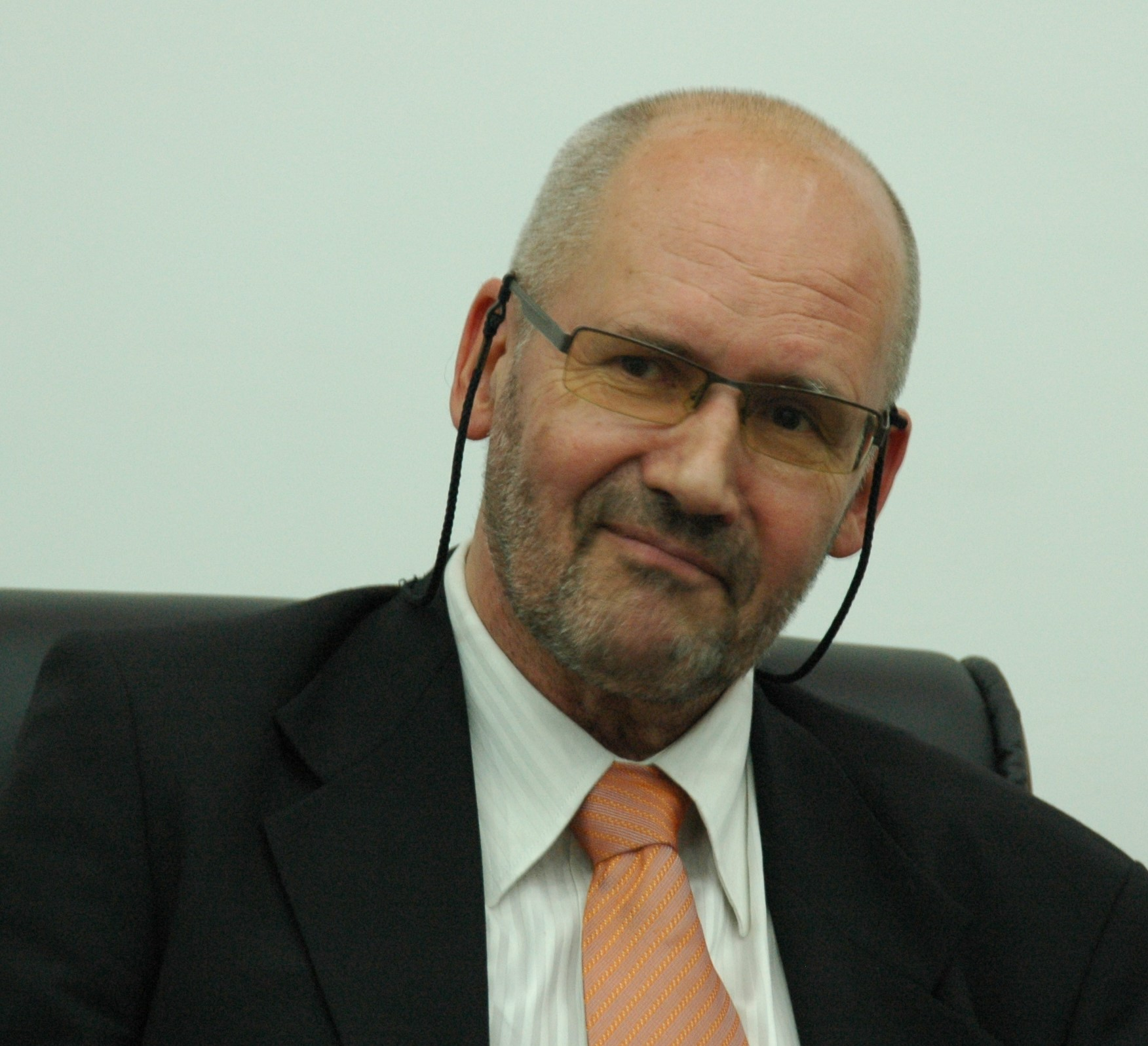
- Born: 10 July 1943; Östersund
- Died: 27 May 2019 (aged 75); Stockholm

Jan Sundell (10 July 1943 – 27 May 2019) was a Swedish Professor in Building Science, affiliated with Technical University of Denmark, University of Texas at Tyler, USA, Tsinghua- and Tianjin Universities in China.

== Biography ==
Jan Sundell was born and grew up in Östersund, in the northern Swedish province of Jämtland. In 1961 he graduated from Högre Allmäna Läroverket. After military service, in 1963, he moved to Stockholm to attend Royal Institute of Technology in Stockholm and for studies at Stockholm University. After obtaining a master's degree in engineering from KTH, he worked for the Swedish authorities, with building codes and regulations for building ventilation. He worked at the National Board of Urban Planning and Building and the National Board of Occupational Safety and Health, where he was Head of section for Ventilation and Thermal Climate. In 1994 he defended his PhD-thesis in medical sciences at Karolinska Institutet.

Both as a scientist and a government official he was a driving force in developing the research area of Indoor Air. He took part in founding the International Society of Indoor Air Quality and Climate (ISIAQ), and conferences Indoor Climate in Copenhagen 1978, Indoor Air in Stockholm 1984 and Healthy Buildings in Stockholm 1988, and he served as editor in chief for the Indoor Air Journal. He initiated and took active part in large national and international studies like the Dampness in Buildings and Health (DBH) in Sweden where the same concept later on have been used in Bulgaria, Denmark, USA, Singapore, Taiwan, and China, as well as the SELMA-study (Swedish Environmental Longitudinal, Mother and child, Asthma and allergy study). He published more than 150 peer reviewed articles. Over time he served on many committees and working groups, such as ASHRAE Environmental Health Committee, WHO - expert groups on indoor Air Quality and Health, and European Multidisciplinary Scientific Consensus Group on Ventilation and Health. He won several prizes, among them The Rockwool Prize in 2004 and the Pettenkofer Gold Medal in 2011.
