= UT Health East Texas =

- UT Tyler Health Science Center; Ardent Health Services

Geography
- Location: East Texas

Organisation
- Affiliated university: University of Texas at Tyler School of Medicine

Services
- Beds: 500+ (UT Health Tyler)

History
- Former name: East Texas Medical Center Regional Healthcare System
- Opened: March 1, 2018

Links
- Website: www.uthealtheasttexas.com

UT Health East Texas (UTHET) is a for-profit hospital system based in Tyler, Texas founded February 2018. The system is jointly owned by the University of Texas System (30%) and Ardent Health Services (70%), and was formed following a merger of the East Texas Medical Center and the University of Texas Health Science Center at Tyler. The hospital system's legal name is "Tyler Regional Hospital, LLC". which operates under the doing-business-as name of "UT Health Tyler", after purchasing the naming rights of the University of Texas system in the merger.

Currently, the University of Texas system does not include the UT Health Tyler hospital and associated satellite clinics under its umbrella of direct administration; however, as of September 2023, UTHET has begun a direct collaboration project with the University system in the construction of a new teaching hospital adjacent to the primary location. The final administration and accreditation of the teaching hospital is pending but likely to include the University system, particularly the University of Texas at Tyler institution.

UTHET operates ten hospitals, 50 physician's clinics, 13 rehabilitations centers, and six Olympic fitness centers. UTHET also operates the only CAAS accredited EMS service in East Texas with 45 ambulances (while competitor CHRISTUS EMS is certified by the IAED organization), AIR 1 with 4 helicopters, and HealthFirst Companies which includes a third-party administrator, proprietary East Texas network across 9 counties, medical management company, and a CVO, Centralized Credentialing Services.

UTHET's direct competition is the Not-For-Profit Christus Health System in Tyler, and indirect competition includes the hospital systems in Dallas, Houston and Shreveport.
