= Reference price =

A reference price (RP) is the price that a purchaser announces that it is willing to pay for a good or service. It is used by high-volume purchasers to inform suppliers.

RP requires consumers to have access to price and quality information, which is not general practice in many industries. Further, it does not help consumers with urgent needs, cognitive and/or other impairments.

Reference pricing requires sufficient competition. Otherwise, consumers have no choice about providers, who in turn face less pricing pressure. Reference pricing could encourage lower quality.

"Reference price" in this context is distinct from its use in behavioral pricing scholarship. In that literature, a "reference price" refers to a mental standard of comparison or a posted statement of "normal" prices used to judge whether an offered price is good deal, such as "was $100; now $70." Reference prices in this context are related to work by Nobel Prize winner Richard Thaler on "transaction utility" in his theory of mental accounting.

== Applications ==
=== Health care ===
Some insurers use reference pricing to reduce their provider costs. The insurer announces prices that it is willing to pay for specific surgical procedures, pharmaceuticals and other services. If the provider charges a higher price, the patient is responsible for the balance. One study estimated that about 40 percent of health care spending is for services for which patients could shop. Appropriate services include hip and knee replacement, colonoscopy, magnetic resonance imaging (MRI) of the spine, computerized tomography (CT) scan of the head or brain, nuclear stress test of the heart, and echocardiogram because they have relatively uniform protocols and are less likely to experience variation in quality.

In health care, a more common alternative is to limit patients to a specific network of providers who have accepted the pricing and other terms specified by the insurer. RP provides consumers a broader choice of providers. Further, some large employers contract with regional "centers of excellence," such as Cleveland Clinic.

Several countries are using RP, such as external reference pricing, to compare the national drug prices against other countries' or other formulations of a similar therapeutic class.

On May 2, 2014, the Obama administration published its approval for large/self-insured firms to use RP for health care services and to use the price of generic drugs as the RP for other drugs, which would encourage patients to favor generics over non-generics. Costs that exceed the RP are not counted for ACA's out-of-pocket limits.

In May 2026, the Trump administration proposed allowing "non-network" health insurance plans to be offered beginning in 2027 on the Affordable Care Act marketplace. Those plans, like those offered by Sidecar Health and Imagine360, employ reference-based pricing or cash-pay models. As of that month, unsubsidized ACA marketplace healthcare premiums are the most expensive for those without employer-sponsored insurance coverage.

==== Reference Based Pricing (RBPs) Plans ====
Reference-Based Pricing (RBP) has become an alternative health insurance reimbursement model that has been adopted by employers to reduce health benefit costs. Unlike PPOs or HMOs, which rely on negotiated rates with provider networks, RBP plans sets reimbursement rates based on external benchmarks, most commonly a multiple of Medicare rates. RBP plans typically have few or no established contracts with health care providers and set maximum payment rates at 120% to 200% of Medicare rates, well below the 254% average payment rates paid by large health plans with negotiated payment rates.

If a provider does not accept the RBP reimbursement rate, they may bill the patient for the remaining balance. Many hospitals, physician groups and other provider organizations refuse to accept patients in RBP plans. Balance billing can lead to debt collection, credit score damage, and even litigation, posing serious financial risks to employees. The federal No Surprises Act (NSA), effective January 1, 2022, provides protections against balance billing for emergency services and certain non-emergency services at in-network facilities. However, these protections may not cover all scenarios under RBP plans, especially when services are received from out-of-network providers without prior agreements.

==== CalPERS ====
In 2011 California Public Employees' Retirement System (CalPERS) adopted reference pricing for 450,000 members. The approach was used for knee and hip replacement surgery, arthroscopy, colonoscopies, cataract removal surgery and other elective procedures. For example, the RP for a knee or hip replacement surgery was $30,000. As before, the patient was responsible for 20 percent of the first $15,000, paying a maximum of $3,000. The insurer covered the next $15,000. However, if the procedure cost $40,000, the patient was responsible for the final $10,000. Initially 41 of the hundreds of hospitals provided knee and hip replacement procedures at or below the RP with acceptable quality. Some hospitals charged more than $100,000. Multiple studies found that patients sought out the lower cost facilities. Prices for knee and hip replacements and cataract surgery fell by an average 20%. Other procedures fell by similar percentages. Many higher price facilities lowered their prices. Quality was apparently unaffected. By contrast, prices paid by employer-sponsored plans rose by about 5.5 percent.

CalPERS reduced cost-sharing for patients who chose a (lower cost) outpatient surgical center, instead of a (higher cost) hospital.

==== Vermont ====
In 2023, Vermont had the most expensive employer-sponsored single coverage health care within the United States. In 2025, Vermont passed The Equal Educational Opportunity Act (Act 68), with the goal of reducing hospital costs by requiring state officials to develop a statewide health care delivery plan and the oversight of an independent agency, Green Mountain Care Board, to implement Medicare-based reference-based pricing in Vermont hospitals by 2027.

=== Energy ===
The Canadian province of Alberta operates an RP scheme for natural gas. It is a monthly, weighted average of the consumer price in Alberta and a price at the Alberta border, with transporting and marketing adjustments. The system became effective in 1994.
