= Quickbase =

American software company

Quickbase, Inc.
- Company type: Private
- Industry: Platform as a service Digital transformation Enterprise Software
- Founded: 1999
- Headquarters: Boston, Massachusetts, U.S.
- Products: Quickbase platform
- Revenue: ▲$200 Million(2022)
- Number of employees: 780 (2025)
- Website: www.quickbase.com

Quickbase, Inc., is a software company headquartered in Boston, Massachusetts spun off from Intuit in March 2016. In January 2019, Vista Equity Partners, a private equity firm, acquired a majority stake in Quickbase from Welsh, Carson, Anderson & Stowe for a reported $1 billion.

Quickbase's platform is intended for building business applications without the need for extensive coding knowledge.

== History ==
In 1999, Joe Rice, Jim Salem, and Claude von Roesgen developed OneBase, a web-based multi-tenant service to enable consolidation and sharing of easily accessible business information. In fall of 1999, Intuit added OneBase to its product portfolio, which includes QuickBooks and TurboTax. In 2000, Intuit renamed OneBase and launched Quickbase, described at the time as a "web-based tool for sharing information that will revolutionize how small businesses and workgroups collaborate with employees, vendors and customers".

In 2005, Quickbase was chosen as PC Magazine Editors' Choice. The same year, Quickbase won the SIIA Codie Award for "Best Business Software Product or Service." In 2015, Intuit announced plans to divest itself from Demandforce, Quickbase, and Quicken operations. Quickbase won the SIIA CODiE Award for Best Real Estate/Construction Management Solution and finalist for Best Cloud Platform as a Service.

In 2016, Welsh, Carson, Anderson & Stowe completed its acquisition of Intuit Quickbase.Vista Equity Partners purchased the majority equity in the company for more than $1B in January 2019. Welsh, Carson, Anderson & Stowe remained a minority stakeholder. In August, Quickbase bought Cloudpipes, which provides integration and automation tools for business applications through a cloud-based platform.

== Services ==
Quickbase is a low-code platform that allows non-technical developers to build, customize and connect secure cloud applications without compromising IT governance and control.
