= John H. Jessen =

John H. Jessen is recognized internationally as an innovator in the fields of computer forensics and electronic evidence discovery. Jessen has been quoted in The Wall Street Journal, The New York Times, The Boston Globe, Le Monde, Newsweek, Forbes, Wired magazine, and on CBS’ 60 Minutes, ABC's 20/20 and the Discovery Channel. He has been called the "best of the breed" of electronic evidence experts by the American Bar Association (ABA) Journal and "the nation’s foremost authority on secret or deleted computer files" by Entrepreneur magazine.

EED Inc. founder Jessen is a technical advisor on electronic discovery to the Sedona Conference, the legal industry's premier forum dedicated to the advanced study of law and policy.

Jessen is the chairman of the Sedona Conference executive committee. He is also on the steering committee of and technical expert to the Sedona Conference Working Group on Electronic Document Retention and Production.
