= Daticon EED =

Daticon EED, Inc.
- Formerly: Electronic Evidence Discovery, Inc.
- Type: Privately Owned
- Industry: Electronic discovery
- Founded: 1987
- Founder: John H. Jessen
- Defunct: 2010
- Fate: Acquired
- Successor: Document Technologies, Inc.
- Headquarters: Kirkland, Washington, United States
- Key people: Tom Haug (President), Chris Maconi (CTO)
- Products: Electronic discovery services and software for law cases, process consulting
- Parent: Welsh, Carson, Anderson & Stowe
- Website: www.daticon-eed.com

Daticon EED, formerly Electronic Evidence Discovery, was an American company that provided electronic discovery for legal use by its clients. After being founding in 1987 by John H. Jessen, the company contributed to many innovations in the industry and significantly expanded its service offerings and altogether worldwide presence.

It was headquartered in Kirkland, WA with regional operations in Chicago, New York, Connecticut, Washington, D.C., California and the United Kingdom. It was acquired by Document Technologies, Inc. in 2010.

== History ==
John H. Jessen founded the company as Electronic Evidence Discovery in 1987 to address the need for electronic evidence discovery after a lawyer hired him to examine a home computer. Following its founding, the company was responsible for many industry firsts in the field of electronic discovery, including forensic collection software in 1987 and an online review application in 1994.

In February 2008, the company formed a partnership with IBM to provide process design consulting and corporate litigation readiness services to IBM customers and reactive services for individual outsourced litigations. Daticon EED also developed an eDiscovery process manager for IBM's Electronic Content Management (ECM) platform on top of IBM's Filenet P8 platform.

In June 2008, EED acquired Daticon LLC, a Connecticut-based provider of early case assessment, electronic discovery, consulting and archive services and changed its brand name to Daticon EED.

In 2010, Daticon EED was acquired by Document Technologies, Inc.

== Industry Involvement ==
Daticon EED was the founding sponsor of both the Electronic Document Retention and Production workgroup and the International Electronic Information Management Discovery and Disclosure workgroup of the Sedona Conference.

Launched in May 2005, the Electronic Discovery Reference Model (EDRM) project was created to deal with the lack of standards and guidelines in the electronic discovery market. Daticon EED participated in the following EDRM projects:

- EDRM Metrics: To provide a standard approach and a generally accepted language for measuring the full range of electronic discovery activities.
- EDRM XML: To develop an XML schema to facilitate movement of electronic information from one stage of the electronic discovery process to the next, one software program to the next, and one organization to the next.
