= Debra Cafaro =

American lawyer

Debra A. Cafaro
- Born: December 15, 1957 (age 68); Pittsburgh, Pennsylvania, US
- Occupation: Businessperson
- Spouse: Terrance K. Livingston (m. 1983)
- Children: 2

Debra A. Cafaro (born December 15, 1957) is an American business executive who has been CEO of Ventas, Inc. since 1999. She is the longest-serving female CEO of an S&P 500 company.

== Personal life ==
Cafaro was born in Pittsburgh, Pennsylvania to a working class Catholic family. She has one younger sister. Her mother, Dee Francis, was first-generation Lebanese who grew up in an Arabic speaking household in Washington, Pennsylvania. Her father was born in Pittsburgh to a first-generation Italian family with 11 children. His immigrant father and mother owned restaurants and bars; her father worked as a letter carrier for the US Postal Service. Cafaro married Terrance K. Livingston in 1983. They have two adult children and reside in suburban Chicago.

== Education and career ==
Cafaro received her B.A. in government economics magna cum laude from the University of Notre Dame in 1979 and her J.D. cum laude in 1982 from The University of Chicago Law School. During Law School, she was the research assistant for Edward H. Levi, the former President of the university and Attorney General of the United States. She had summer associate stints at the law firms Jones Day in Cleveland (1980), Debevoise & Plimpton in New York (1981) and Cleary Gottlieb in New York (1982). In 1982–83, Cafaro served as a judicial clerk to the Hon. J. Dickson Phillips, United States Court of Appeals for the Fourth Circuit. From 1983 to 1997, Cafaro practiced real estate, corporate and finance law, while she also taught real estate transactions and finance as an adjunct professor at Northwestern University Law School from 1988 to 1992. She joined Ambassador Apartments Inc. (NYSE:AAH), a multifamily REIT, as president and a director, in 1997 where she helped sell the company.

Cafaro was hired as president and chief executive officer to rescue Ventas, a healthcare REIT, in 1999. Her initial actions at Ventas were to restructure the bank debt and lead a global consensual restructuring of its main tenant, Vencor, so Vencor could emerge from bankruptcy (renamed Kindred Healthcare, Inc.)

At the time of Cafaro’s hiring in 1999, Ventas’s equity valuation was $200 million. As of 2009 this had risen to $7 billion, and it has continued to more than $30 billion in 2025. Throughout the 2008 financial crisis Cafaro led Ventas though a defensive investment cycle, which helped the company fundraise and recover faster than peers.

Cafaro has since overseen Ventas’ ownership of approximately 1,350 properties in North America and the United Kingdom. This includes over 800 senior housing communities, making it one of the largest senior-housing owners in the country, along with other outpatient medical buildings, research centers and healthcare facilities.

Cafaro has appeared on CNBC and been quoted in The Wall Street Journal describing real estate trends for senior housing and aging demographics.

She has also served on the board of PNC Financial Services since August 2017 and is a member of The University of Chicago’s Board of Trustees.

=== Professional sports ownership ===
In 2016, Cafaro became an owner and member of the management committee of the Pittsburgh Penguins, a National Hockey League team, who won back-to-back Stanley Cup championships in 2016 and 2017.

She is also part of the ownership group of the National Women’s Soccer League Chicago Red Stars and part owner of Major League Baseball’s Baltimore Orioles.

=== Awards, honors and recognition ===
In 2011, Cafaro was named a Top 50 Woman in World Business by the Financial Times. In 2016 and 2017 she was also named in Forbes’ list of the World's 100 Most Powerful Women.

Cafaro was listed as one of the best performing CEOs in the world for six years by the Harvard Business Review, up until the list was discontinued in 2020.

In 2022, she received the Order of Lincoln Award from The Lincoln Academy of Illinois’, the state’s highest honor for professional achievement and public service.

In 2026, the Chicago History Museum selected Cafaro for the Cyrus McCormick Making History Award for Historic Corporate Achievement.
