= University of Texas Rio Grande Valley School of Medicine =

Medical school of University of Texas Rio Grande Valley

UTRGV School of Medicine
- Type: Public
- Established: 2014
- Dean: Everardo Cobos, MD, FACP
- Location: Edinburg, Texas, United States; 26.308574°N 98.175362°W
- Campus: Rural
- Website: uthealthrgv.org
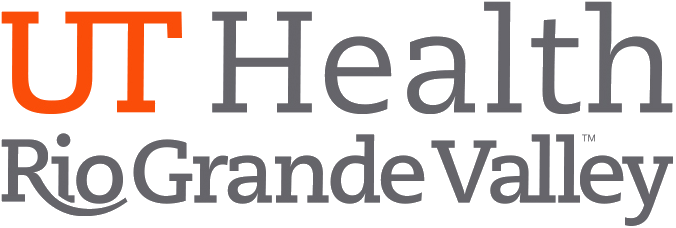

The University of Texas Rio Grande Valley School of Medicine is a public medical school of University of Texas Rio Grande Valley located in Edinburg, Texas. It is fully accredited by the Liaison Committee on Medical Education (LCME). The UTRGV School of Medicine was established by the Texas Legislature in May 2013. The medical school enrolled its first class of 50 first-year medical students in the fall of 2016.

== History ==
On February 14, 2014, The University of Texas System announced Dr. Francisco Fernandez as the founding dean of the UTRGV School of Medicine.

On July 10, 2014, University of Texas Board of Regents unanimously approved the establishment of a doctor of medicine degree.

Dr. Everardo Cobos was appointed dean in February 2026, after serving as interim dean since summer 2025.
