= University of Texas System =

Public university system in Texas

The University of Texas System
- Motto: Disciplina Praesidium Civitatis
- Motto in English: Cultivated mind is the guardian genius of democracy.
- Type: Public university system
- Established: 1876; 150 years ago
- Endowment: $47.47 billion (FY2024)
- Budget: $36.6 billion (FY2027, operating)
- Chancellor: John M. Zerwas M.D.
- Faculty: 24,812 (fall 2022)
- Administrative staff: 11,796 (fall 2023)
- Total staff: 135,210 (fall 2023)
- Students: 256,783 (fall 2023)
- Undergraduates: 192,853 (fall 2023)
- Postgraduates: 60,141 (fall 2023)
- Location: 210 West 7th Street, Austin, Texas, U.S.
- Website: www.utsystem.edu

The University of Texas System (UT System) is a public university system in the U.S. state of Texas. It includes thirteen institutions across Texas. The UT System is headquartered in Downtown Austin. It is the largest university system in Texas with 270,000+ enrolled students, 160,000+ health care professionals, faculty, researchers and support staff. The UT System's endowment is the largest of any public university system in the United States.

== Component institutions ==
University of Texas System Locations.

=== Academic institutions ===
The University of Texas System includes nine academic institutions, each of which confers its own degrees.

Official name	Abbrev.	Location	Estab.	Joined system	Total Enrollment (Fall 2022)	Undergrad Enrollment (Fall 2022)	Graduate Enrollment (Fall 2022)	Team name	Athletic conference	Endowment (Fall 2022)	Refs
Stephen F. Austin State University	SFA	Nacogdoches	1923	2023	11,232	9,772	1,460	Lumberjacks & Ladyjacks	Southland; NCAA D-I FCS	$106,762,909	
The University of Texas at Arlington	UTA; UT Arlington	Arlington, Fort Worth	1895	1965	40,942	29,366	11,576	Mavericks	United; NCAA D-I (non-football) (Note: The United Athletic Conference plays football in Division I FCS, but UT Arlington has not fielded a football team since 1985.)	$203,134,018	
The University of Texas at Austin	UT; UT Austin	Austin	1883		52,384	41,309	11,075	Longhorns	SEC; NCAA D-I FBS	$18,795,792,115	
The University of Texas at Dallas	UTD; UT Dallas	Richardson, Dallas	1961	1969	31,570	21,311	10,259	Comets	Lone Star; NCAA D-II (non-football)	$746,071,702	
The University of Texas at El Paso	UTEP; UT El Paso	El Paso	1913	1967	23,880	20,165	3,715	Miners	Mountain West; NCAA D-I FBS	$353,327,002	
The University of Texas Rio Grande Valley	UTRGV; UT Rio Grande Valley	Edinburg, Brownsville	2015		31,559	26,434	5,125	Vaqueros	Southland; NCAA D-I FCS	$162,179,991	
The University of Texas at San Antonio	UTSA; UT San Antonio	San Antonio	1969		33,557	28,590	4,967	Roadrunners	American; NCAA D-I FBS	$264,163,030	
The University of Texas at Tyler	UTT; UT Tyler	Tyler	1971	1979	9,064	6,960	2,104	Patriots	Lone Star; NCAA D-II (non-football)	$188,738,734	
The University of Texas Permian Basin	UTPB; UT Permian Basin	Odessa	1973		5,250	4,288	962	Falcons	Lone Star; NCAA D-II	$64,244,334	

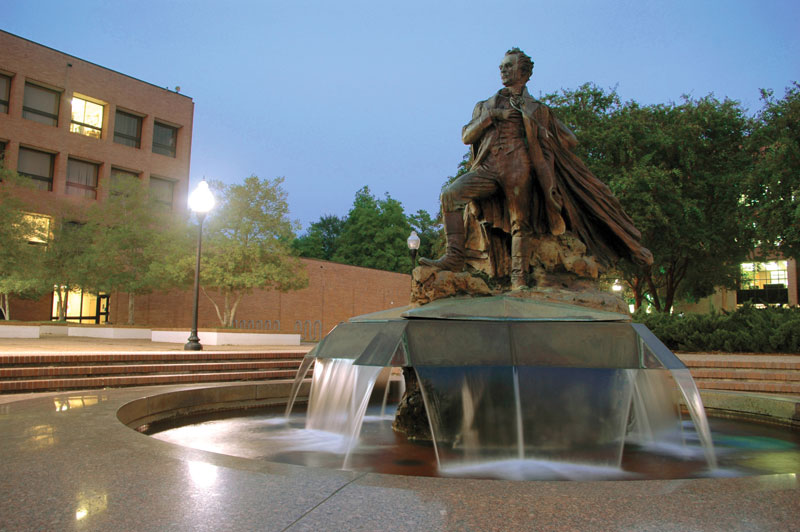
Stephen F. Austin

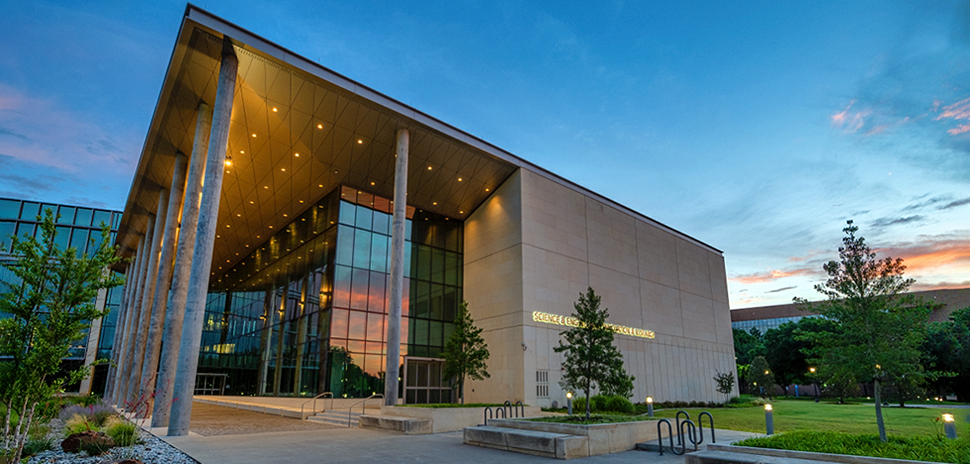
UT Arlington

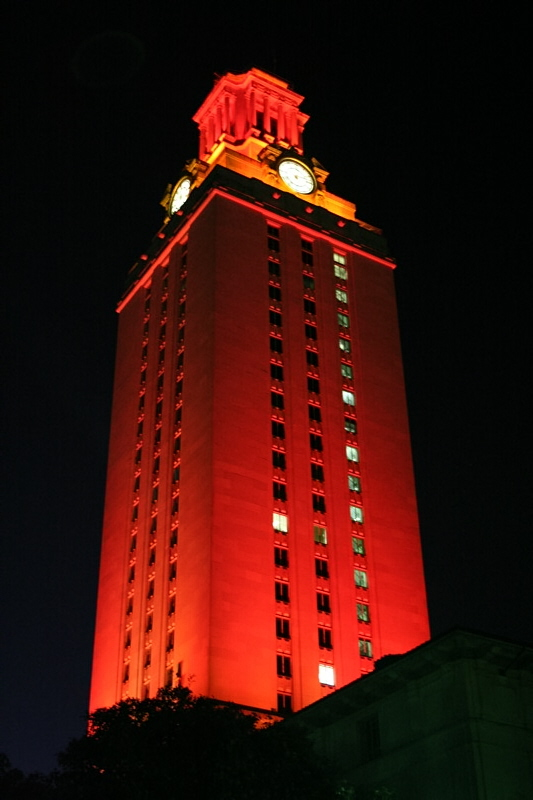
UT Austin

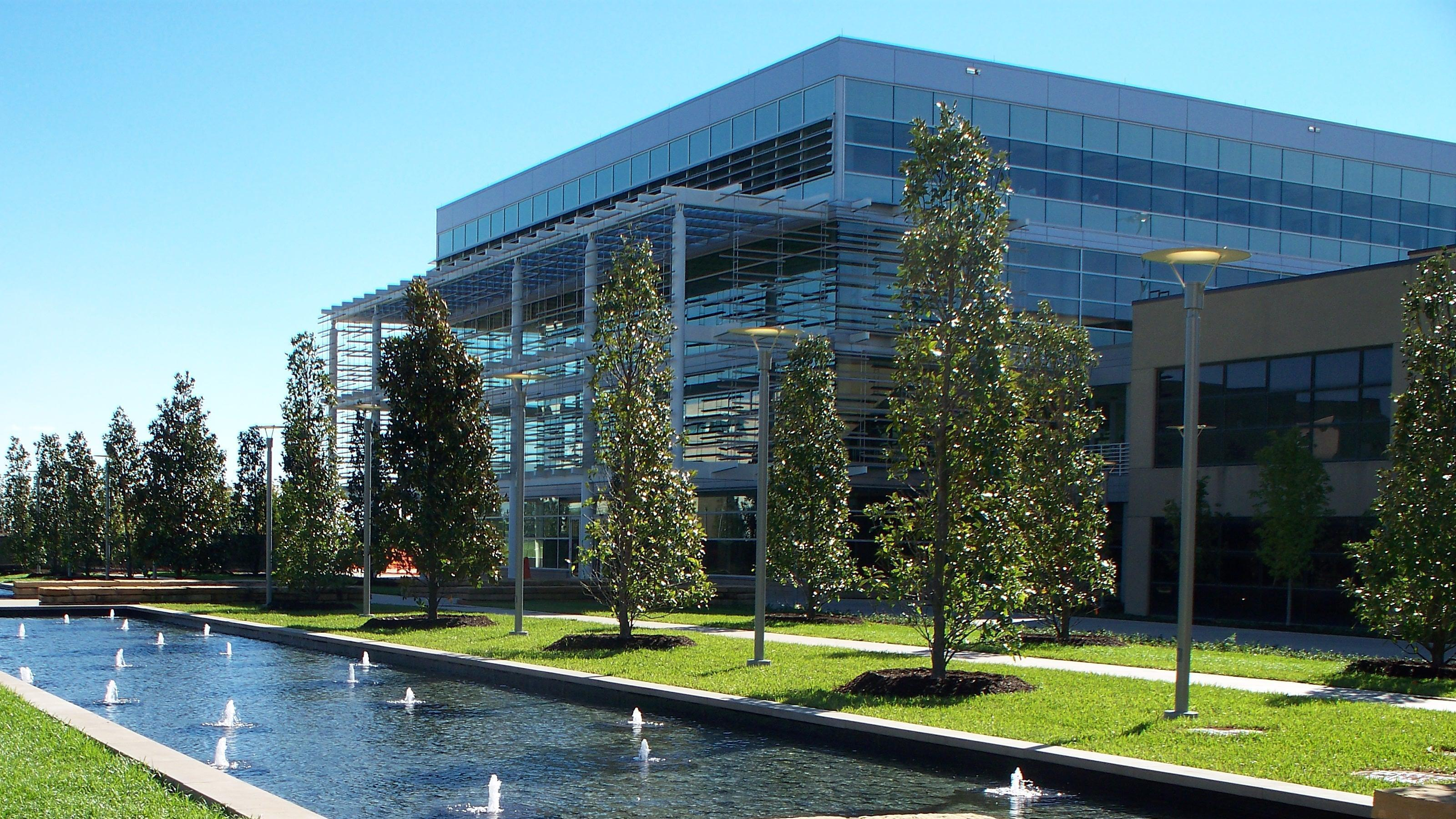
UT Dallas

UT El Paso

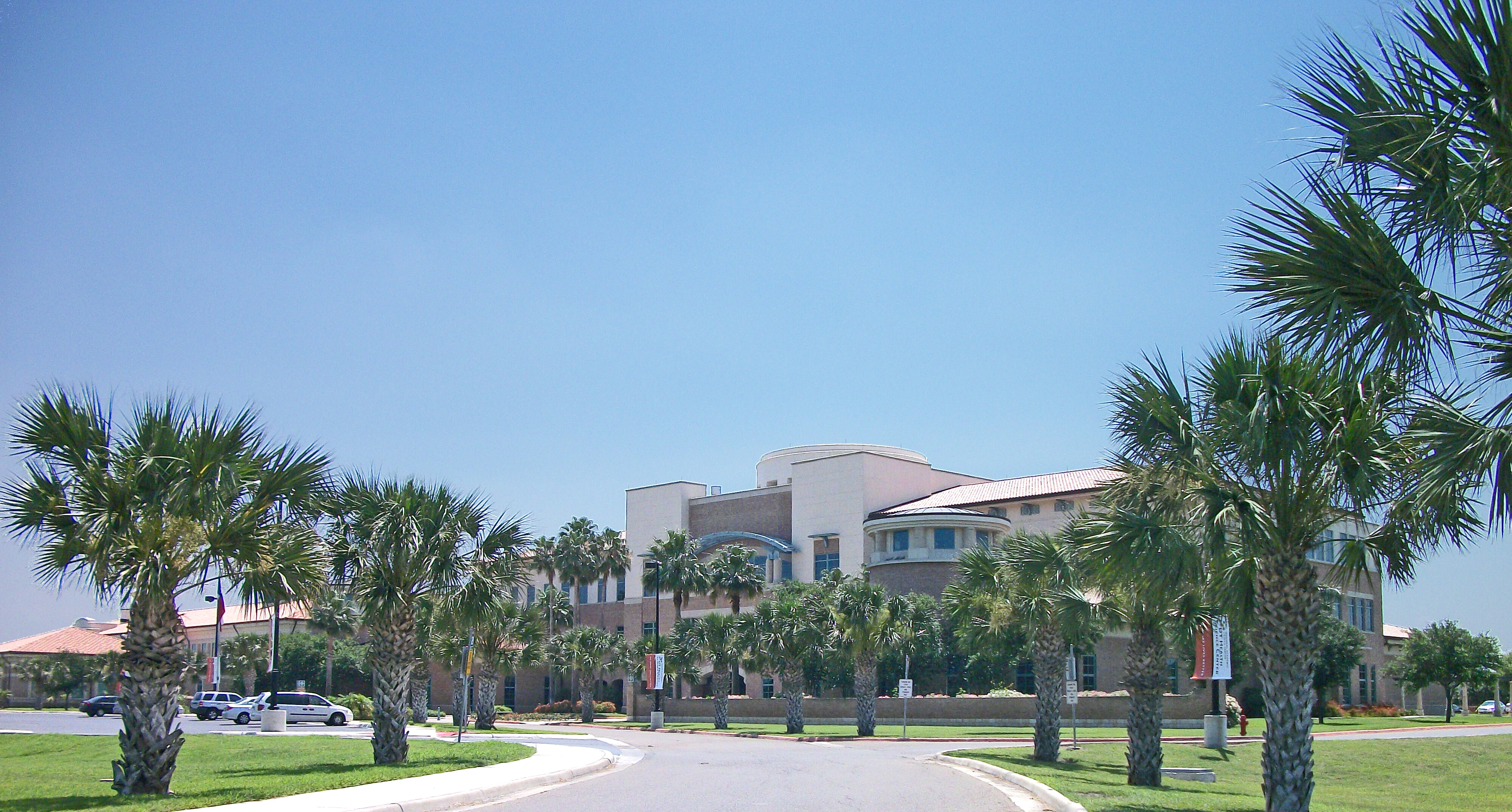
UT Rio Grande Valley

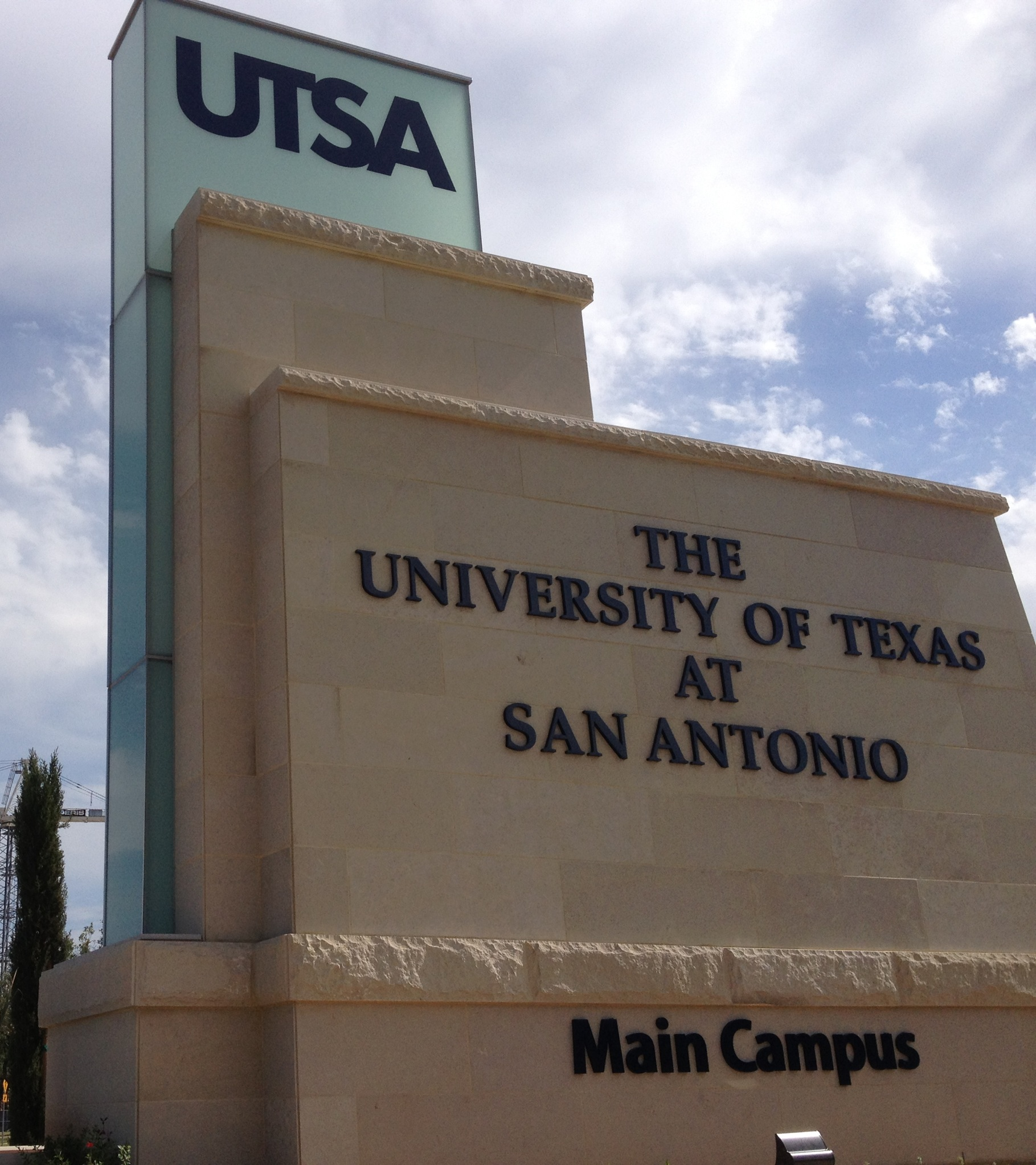
UT San Antonio

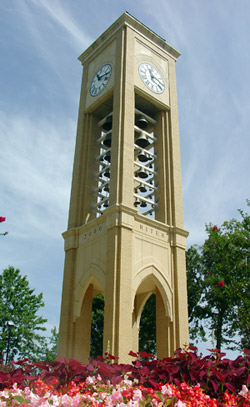
UT Tyler

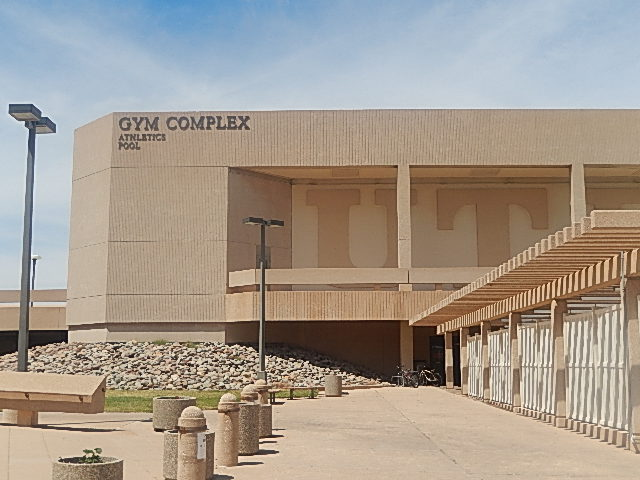
UT Permian Basin

==== Addition of Stephen F. Austin State University ====
On November 29, 2022, the Board of Regents of Stephen F. Austin State University (SFA) announced their decision to accept an invitation to join the UT System. This decision occurred following an announcement at the start of the fall semester by SFA President Steve Westbrook that the board was considering joining a system. At the time, Stephen F. Austin was one of two independent public universities in Texas, alongside Texas Southern University. The Texas A&M University System, the Texas Tech University System, and the Texas State University System all extended invitations as well. The decision to join the UT System was made following a process that included faculty, staff, student, and alumni input. Stephen F. Austin's addition to the UT System was approved by the Texas Legislature during the 2023 session. The identically worded House and Senate bills that would formally add SFA to the UT System specified that SFA would retain its name, but with the phrase "a member of The University of Texas System" appended to the legal school name. They also stated that SFA would be technically dissolved and then immediately reconstituted as a member of the UT System. The Senate unanimously passed its bill on April 16, 2023, and the House passed its version on April 26. Governor Greg Abbott signed the measure into law on May 10.

==== UT Brownsville and UT Pan American (UTRGV) merger ====
On June 14, 2013, Texas Governor Rick Perry signed a law officially approving the creation of a new university in South Texas within the UT System and replacing UT Brownsville and UT Pan American. The initiative resulted in a single institution, including a medical school, spanning the entire Rio Grande Valley, with a presence in each of the major metropolitan areas of Brownsville, Edinburg, Harlingen, and McAllen. On December 12, 2013, the UT Board of Regents voted to name the new university the University of Texas Rio Grande Valley. The new university began full operation in the 2015–16 school year.

Official name	Official abbreviations	Location	Founded	Joined system	Merged	Refs
The University of Texas at Brownsville	UTB UT Brownsville	Brownsville	1973	1991	2015 (merged to form The University of Texas Rio Grande Valley)	
The University of Texas–Pan American	UTPA UT Pan American	Edinburg	1927	1989	2015 (merged to form The University of Texas Rio Grande Valley)	

==== UT Tyler and UTHSC Tyler merger ====
In December 2019, the UT System Board of Regents unanimously agreed to merge The University of Texas Health Science Center at Tyler (UTHSCT) under The University of Texas at Tyler (UTT), creating a single unified institution. Two months later, the UT System formally announced its intention to establish a new medical school that would be added under the new unified UT Tyler administration. It was to be the first medical school in the East Texas region.

On December 8, 2020, The Southern Association of Colleges and Schools Commission on Schools approved a plan to merge UT Tyler and UTHSCT. UTHSCT would retain its status as a health-related institution but come under the administration of UT Tyler. The UT System Board of Regents met in late December 2020 and took action on the implementation of the merger which began on January 1, 2021.

On January 4, 2021, the Board of Regents installed Kirk A. Calhoun, M.D. as president of the newly aligned UT Tyler and UTHSCT. As of January 4, these two institutions officially became one, and on January 15, 2021 the institution publicly named the new line of executive leadership for the merged institution.

The medical school opened in 2023.

Official name	Official abbreviations	Location	Founded	Joined system	Merged	Refs
The University of Texas at Tyler	UTT UT Tyler	Tyler	1971	1979	2021 (merged as The University of Texas at Tyler)	
The University of Texas Health Science Center at Tyler	UTHSCT UT Health Tyler	Tyler	1943	1977	2021 (merged as The University of Texas at Tyler)	

==== UTSA and UTHSCSA merger ====
In 2010, a study was commissioned to explore the possibility of merging UT San Antonio and UT Health San Antonio. Officials ultimately decided against it, citing significant costs, administrative challenges, and different university cultures. In 2016, an op-ed published in the San Antonio Express-News urged the UT System Board of Regents to reconsider their decision. It was announced in August 2024 that the Board of Regent voted to merge the two into one university, a merger completed on September 1, 2025

Official name	Official abbreviations	Location	Founded	Joined system	Merged	Refs
The University of Texas at San Antonio	UTSA UT San Antonio	San Antonio	1969		2025 (merged as University of Texas at San Antonio)	
The University of Texas Health Science Center at San Antonio	UTHSCSA UT Health San Antonio	San Antonio	1959	1967	2025 (merged as University of Texas at San Antonio)	

=== Health institutions ===
The University of Texas System has 4 independent health institutions — UT Health Houston, UT Medical Branch, UT MD Anderson and UT Southwestern. UT Health San Antonio is now part of UT San Antonio, since September 1, 2025.

Additionally, there are medical schools at UT Austin, UT San Antonio and UT Rio Grande Valley that are not independent health institutions. The fourth medical school organized under an academic institution is UT Tyler Medical School, which began operations in 2023, and will graduate its first cohort in 2027. UTSA and UTHSA completed their merger in 2025.

==== Independent UT Health institutions ====
Official name	Abbrev.	Medical school	Location	Estab.	Total Enrollment (Fall 2022)	Undergrad Enrollment (Fall 2022)	Graduate Enrollment (Fall 2022)	Endowment (Fall 2022)	Refs
The University of Texas Health Science Center at Houston	UTH or UTHSCH UTHealth or UT Houston	McGovern Medical School	Houston	1972	5,319	554	4,765	$899,272,216	
The University of Texas MD Anderson Cancer Center	UTMDA MD Anderson	N/A (associated with UT Houston)	Houston, Katy, League City, Memorial City, Sugar Land, The Woodlands	1941	364	337	27	$1,729,114,508	
The University of Texas Medical Branch at Galveston	UTMB UT Galveston	John Sealy School of Medicine	Galveston	1891	3,291	581	2,710	$779,202,806	
The University of Texas Southwestern Medical Center	UTSW UT Southwestern	UTSW Medical School	Dallas, Fort Worth, Frisco, Irving, Richardson	1943	2,351	N/A (Graduate students only)	2,351	$3,157,125,475	

==== Medical schools within academic institutions ====
Medical school	Academic institution affiliation	Location	Estab.	Refs
Dell Medical School	UT Austin	Austin	2013	
UTRGV School of Medicine	UT Rio Grande Valley	Harlingen, Brownsville, Edinburg	2013	
Long School of Medicine	UTSA	San Antonio	1959 (merged with UTSA in 2025)	
UT Tyler School of Medicine	UT Tyler	Tyler	2023	

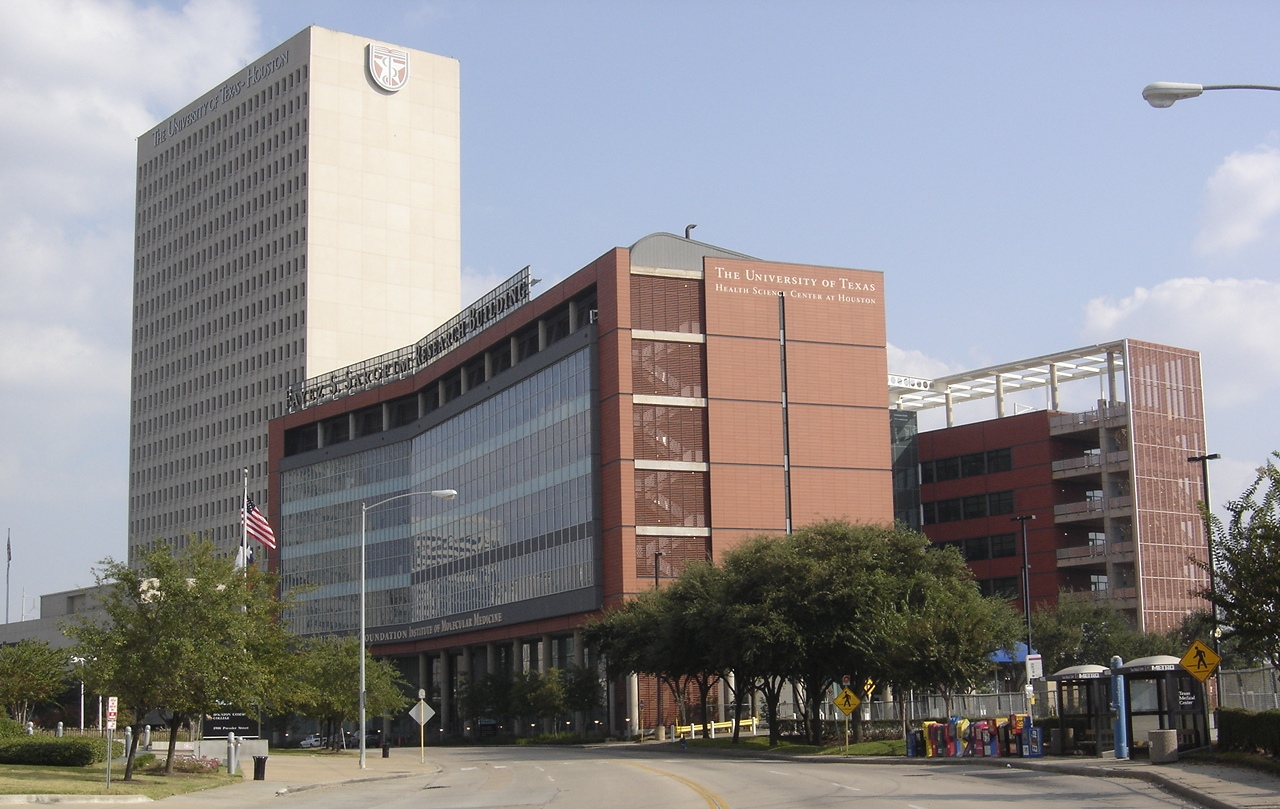
UT Health Science Center - Houston

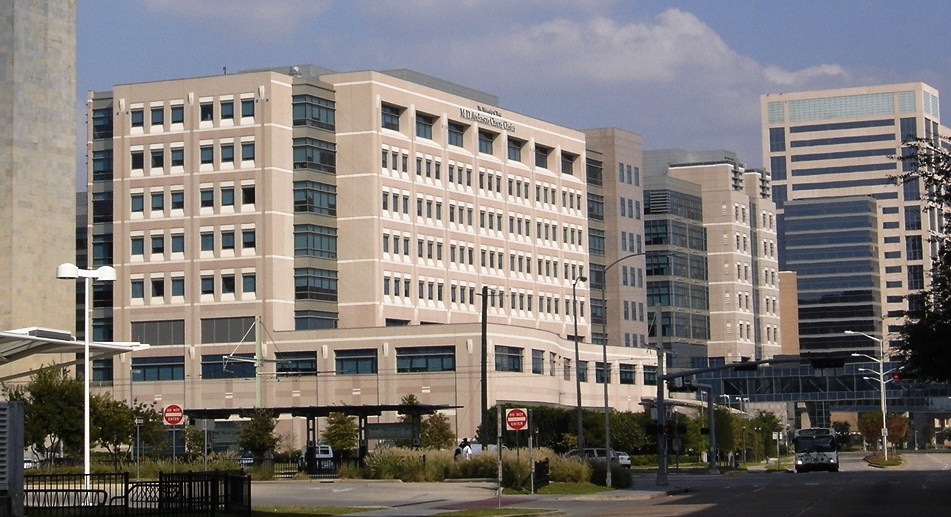
UT MD Anderson Cancer Center (Houston, TX)

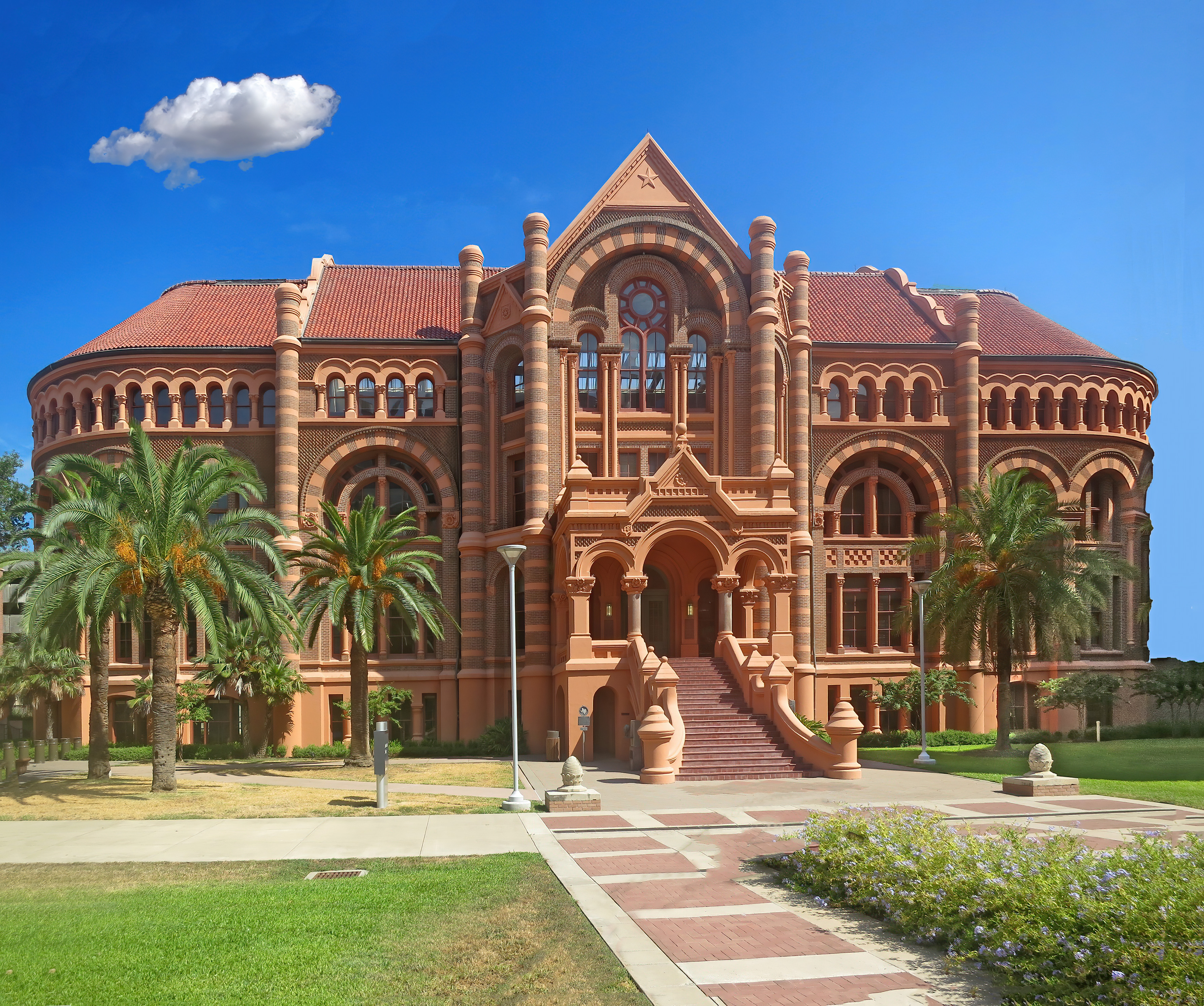
UT Medical Branch at Galveston

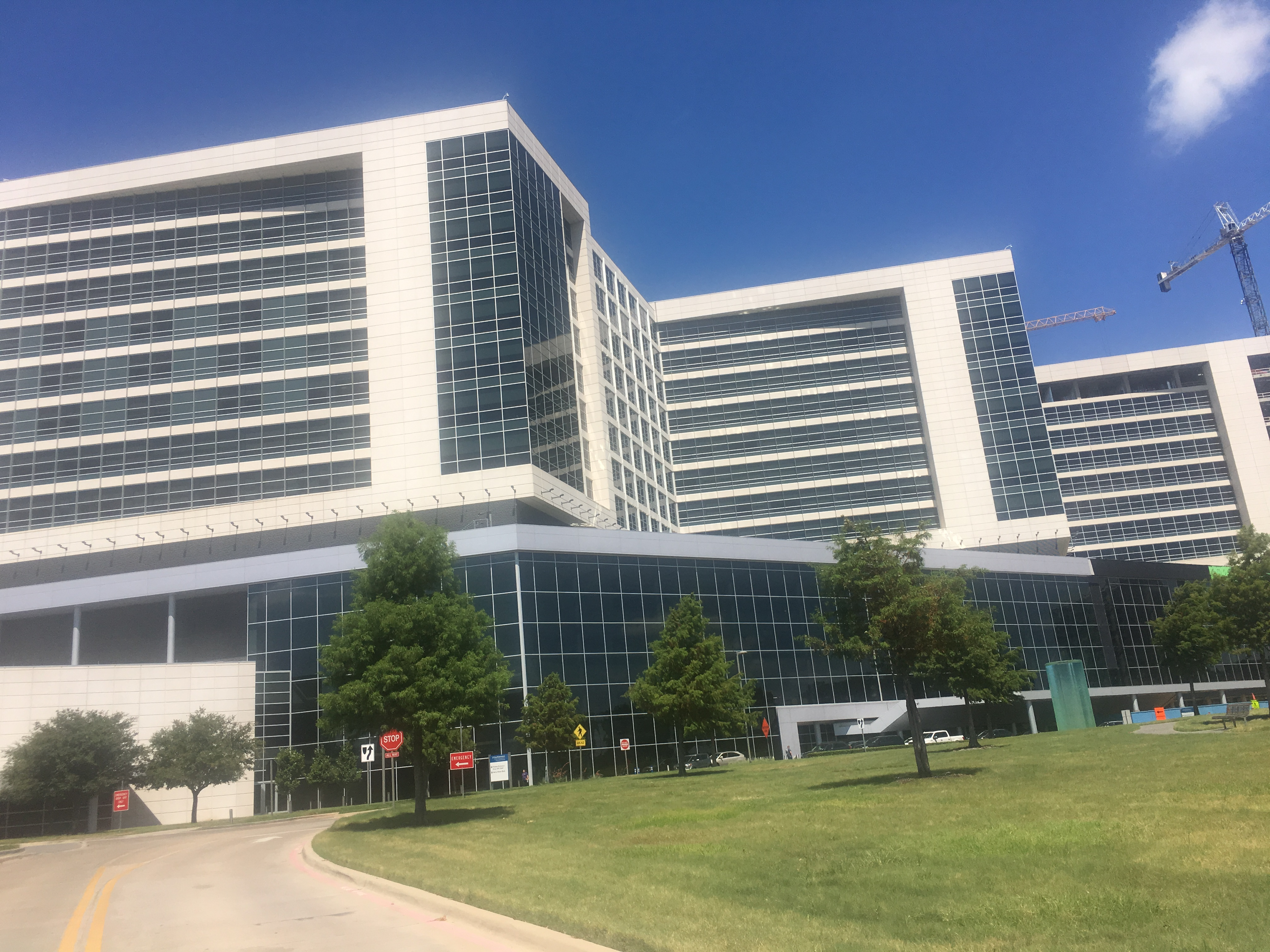
UT Southwestern Medical Center (Dallas, TX)

==== Attempted academic and health institutions mergers ====
Dallas–Fort Worth

In 2001 the 77th Texas Legislature proposed HB 3568, which would have merged all Dallas–Fort Worth UT System institutions (UT Dallas, UT Arlington, and UT Southwestern) under the name "The University of Texas at Dallas". UTD's Richardson campus would have been designated as the main campus, UTA's Arlington campus would have become a satellite campus, and UTSW's Dallas campus would have become the merged university's medical school. The purpose was to help the metroplex gain one unified flagship-level university, but the House Bill ultimately failed to pass due to objections from UT Arlington (which wanted to retain its identity as a separate university) and the lack of time to properly explain the complex process to state representatives.

Houston

In 2015, the UT System purchased 300 acres of land in the Houston area for $215 million for the development of a research campus, spearheaded by then-Chancellor William H. McRaven. While the UT System publicly denied plans to build a new university on the land, the land acquisition drew criticism from the University of Houston System and several Texas State Senators, notably John Whitmire, focusing on the UT System encroaching on the UH System, given the UT System's access to the Permanent University Fund, as well as the process by which the land was purchased. In 2017, the UT System announced it would be cancelling plans for the Houston campus.

== Students ==
=== Racial and/or ethnic background ===
Demographic information of the total student population at all UT system academic and health institutions compared to 2020 US Census data.

	UT System Students (2022)	Texas (Census 2020)	US (Census 2020)
Asian	14%	5.7%	6.3%
Black	8%	13.4%	13.6%
Hispanic	50%	40.2%	19.1%
White (Non-Hispanic)	23%	39.8%	58.9%
International student	3%	N/A	N/A
Other races or unknown	3%	0.9%	2.1%

=== Undergraduate student success metrics ===
Reported 2022 statistics of Texas residents that attended UT system academic institutions.

Official name	Abbrev.	Retention Rate (1st Year Freshman)	Graduation Rate (4 Year)	Graduation Rate (6 Year)	Avg. Student Loan Debt for Bachelor's	Median Income (1yr after graduation)	Median Income (5yrs after graduation)	Median Income (10yrs after graduation)
Stephen F. Austin State University	SFA	73%	43%	64%	$27,314	N/A (No data reported yet)	N/A (No data reported yet)	N/A (No data reported yet)
The University of Texas at Arlington	UTA; UT Arlington	74%	38%	65%	$20,183	$60,676	$69,029	$71,901
The University of Texas at Austin	UT; UT Austin	93%	74%	91%	$22,044	$52,084	$71,614	$88,825
The University of Texas at Dallas	UTD; UT Dallas	85%	58%	75%	$21,953	$51,725	$66,540	$78,748
The University of Texas at El Paso	UTEP; UT El Paso	75%	24%	50%	$20,952	$40,146	$54,294	$58,937
The University of Texas Rio Grande Valley	UTRGV; UT Rio Grande Valley	76%	33%	57%	$14,950	$35,518	$53,219	$58,837
The University of Texas at San Antonio	UTSA; UT San Antonio	80%	39%	67%	$21,147	$40,143	$58,625	$64,866
The University of Texas at Tyler	UTT; UT Tyler	61%	51%	61%	$19,701	$53,243	$59,622	$66,116
The University of Texas Permian Basin	UTPB; UT Permian Basin	65%	27%	47%	$19,930	$52,750	$59,650	$63,574

== Administration ==
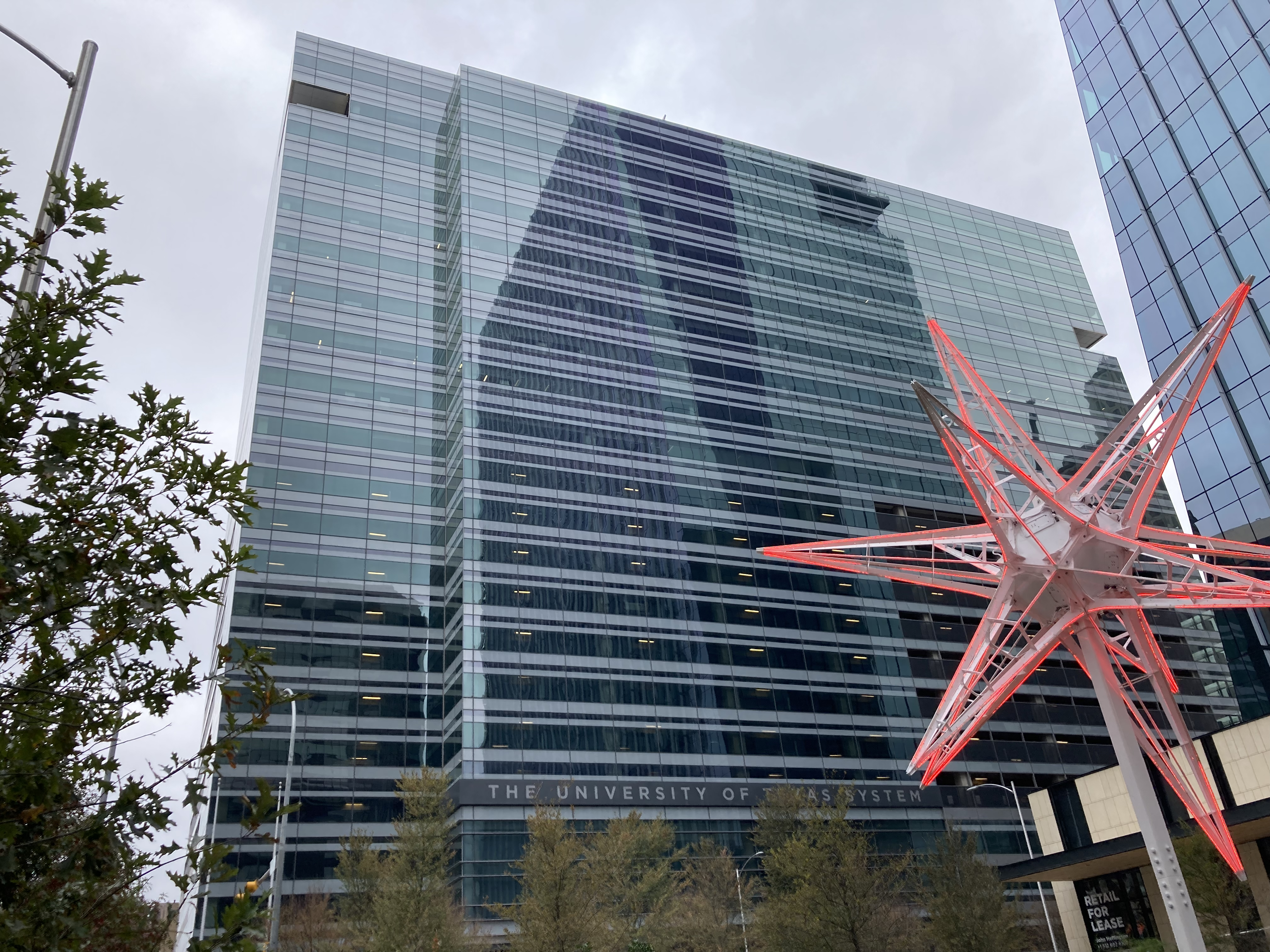
Headquarters

The administrative offices are in Downtown Austin. The UT system approved moving the system headquarters in November 2012. Bonds from the UT System's endowment funded the construction of the new 19-story, 330,000-square-foot (31,000 m^{2}) headquarters, which had a price tag of $102 million. The UT System planned to lease a portion of the facility for shops and other offices, with the approximately 200,000-square-foot (19,000 m^{2}) remaining portion used for its own employees. The system headquarters opened on August 1, 2017.

In July 2018, the Pentagon announced it had selected the UT System administrative building as the headquarters for the Army Futures Command, a new organization committed to coordinating modernization efforts and integrating innovation across the Army.

The University of Texas System was previously headquartered in O. Henry Hall in Downtown Austin. The system headquarters complex previously included multiple buildings, which had 550 employees in 2014. These facilities included O. Henry Hall, Claudia Taylor Johnson Hall (named after Lady Bird Johnson), Ashbel Smith Hall, the Colorado Building, and the Lavaca Building,

In 2013 the UT system approved the demolitions of the Colorado Building and the Lavaca Building, and the new UT System headquarters was built where these buildings previously stood. The Texas State University System purchased O. Henry Hall in 2015 for $8.2 million; the UT System leased it and continued using it as its administrative headquarters prior to the 2017 completion of the UT System's current headquarters. The UT System leased the land containing Claudia Taylor Johnson Hall and Ashbel Smith Hall to Trammell Crow which is constructing a commercial property on the site that uses the facade of Johnson Hall. Ashbel Smith Hall was imploded on March 25, 2018.

== Chancellors ==
The following persons have served as chancellor of the University of Texas System:

No.	Image	Chancellor	Term start	Term end	Ref.
1		James Pinckney Hart	July 24, 1950	January 1, 1954	
acting		Logan Wilson	January 2, 1954	September 30, 1954	
2		Logan Wilson	October 1, 1954 (Note: The board appointed Wilson President of The University of Texas on September 18, 1954, effective October 1, 1954. Board changes position to Chancellor on September 1, 1960.)	March 31, 1961	
3		Harry Huntt Ransom	April 1, 1961	December 31, 1970	
4		Charles A. LeMaistre	January 1, 1971	July 31, 1978 (Note: Resigned to head the University of Texas MD Anderson Cancer Center.)	
acting		E. Don Walker	August 1, 1978	October 19, 1978	
5		E. Don Walker	October 19, 1978	August 31, 1984	
6		Hans M. Mark	September 1, 1984	August 31, 1992	
7		William H. Cunningham	September 1, 1992	May 31, 2000	
interim		R. Dan Burck	June 1, 2000	December 5, 2000	
8		R. Dan Burck	December 6, 2000	July 31, 2002	
9		Mark G. Yudof	August 1, 2002	April 30, 2008 (Note: Resigned to head the University of California.)	
interim		Kenneth I. Shine	May 1, 2008	February 1, 2009	
10		Francisco G. Cigarroa	February 2, 2009	January 4, 2015	
11		William H. McRaven	January 5, 2015	May 31, 2018 (Note: Resigned for health reasons.)	
interim		Larry R. Faulkner	June 1, 2018	September 16, 2018	
12		James B. Milliken	September 17, 2018	May 31, 2025 (Note: Resigned to head the University of California.)	
interim		John Zerwas	June 1, 2025	August 20, 2025	
13		John Zerwas	August 20, 2025	present	

Table notes:

== Coordinated Admissions Program ==
The Coordinated Admissions Program (CAP) offers some UT Austin applicants the chance to attend the university if they complete their freshman year at another system school and meet specified requirements. Each institution in the University of Texas System sets its own admissions standards, and not all schools may accept a particular CAP student. UT Dallas does not participate in the CAP program.

== See also ==
- Permanent University Fund
- Education in Texas
- History of education in Texas
- University of Texas at Austin admissions controversy
- List of colleges and universities in the United States by endowment over $1 billion
- University of Texas Education and Research Center at Laredo
