= Camp Fannin =

U.S. Army facility in Texas

- Tyler, Texas

Site information
- Type: Military Base
- Controlled by: 1943–1946: United States Army

Location
- Coordinates: 32°26′N 95°11.5′W

Site history
- Built: 1943; 83 years ago
- In use: 1943–1946

Camp Fannin was a U.S. Army Infantry Replacement Training Center and prisoner-of-war camp located in between Tyler, Texas, and Gladewater, Texas. It was opened in May 1943 and operated for four years, before closing in 1946. It is credited with training over 200,000 U.S. soldiers, sometimes as many as 40,000 at one given time.

Originally planned as a U.S. Army Air Corps station, Camp Fannin was constructed in the spring of 1943, the camp was named for Col. James Walker Fannin, a Texas Revolutionary War hero, who died at Goliad. The original plan moved to Pounds Army Air Field (now Tyler Pounds Regional Airport.)

The camp served as a German POW camp during World War II. Two attempted escape, but were quickly captured.

The area where Camp Fannin existed was returned to non-military use during 1946. A section of the land was handed over to the state of Texas, where the once military hospital was transformed to the East Texas Tuberculosis Santorium, later the University of Texas Health Center at Tyler. Other buildings were sold to commercial and development companies. Many buildings still stand today, most of which are used as location for business and warehouses.

A memorial, paid for the Camp Fannin Association, stands at the UT Health Center at Tyler.

== See also ==
- List of World War II prisoner-of-war camps in the United States
