= Ventas (company) =

American real estate company

Ventas, Inc.
- Type: Public
- Traded as: NYSE: VTR; S&P 500 component
- Industry: Real estate investment trust Health care
- Founded: 1998; 28 years ago
- Headquarters: 353 North Clark; Chicago, Illinois, U.S.
- Key people: Debra Cafaro (Chairman and CEO)
- Products: Health care facilities
- Revenue: ▲US$3.8 billion (2019)
- Net income: ▲US$433 million (2019)
- Total assets: US$24.7 billion (2019)
- Total equity: US$10.55 billion (2019)
- Number of employees: 500 (2020)
- Website: www.ventasreit.com

Ventas, Inc. is a real estate investment trust specializing in the ownership and management of research, medicine and healthcare facilities in the United States, Canada and the United Kingdom.

As of December 2019, the group's portfolio consisted of 1,200 properties divided among nursing homes, medical office buildings, rehabilitation and acute care centres, special care centres, laboratories and research centres and medical-surgical centres for a total value of nearly $25 billion.

As of 2019, it is a Fortune 1000 corporation.

== History ==
The company was founded in 1998 as a spin-off of Vencor, a company founded by Bruce Lunsford, who would later be an unsuccessful Democratic candidate for Governor of Kentucky in 2007 and an unsuccessful candidate for Senator from Kentucky in 2008.

Ventas acquired the real estate investments of Ardent Health Services in 2015. In June 2021, Ventas announced the acquisition of New Senior Investment Group.
