= Russell Carson =

American businessman

Russell L. Carson
- Born: 1943 (age 82–83)
- Education: Dartmouth College (A.B.); Columbia Business School (M.B.A.)
- Known for: Founder of Welsh, Carson, Anderson & Stowe

Russell L. Carson (born 1943) is a co-founder and General Partner at private equity firm Welsh, Carson, Anderson & Stowe.

== Early life and career ==
Carson attended public high school in Toledo, Ohio. He then matriculated at Dartmouth College, graduating with an A.B. in economics in 1965. After Dartmouth, Carson attended Columbia Business School and obtained an MBA in 1967. From 1967 to 1978, he worked at the Citicorp Venture Capital subsidiary of Citicorp, serving as its chairman and CEO from 1974 to 1978. Carson left Citicorp to fund the private equity fund Welsh, Carson, Anderson & Stowe.

He was a Trustee of the Metropolitan Museum of Art from 2003 to 2016 and is currently listed as a Trustee Emeriti. This is perhaps due to his contribution to the reinstallation of the Tombs of Perneb and Raemkai and surrounding galleries of the museum.

Carson is Chairman of The Carson Family Charitable Trust, which is a private foundation that he founded in 1991 along with family members.

He is Chair Emeritus of the Rockefeller University’s Board of Trustees.

== Personal life ==
Carson is married to his wife Judy and together they have two children.
