= Sidecar (sparkling water) =

Term used for a glass of water for cleansing one's palate

A sidecar is a term for a small glass of sparkling water or seltzer served beside an espresso. The purpose of the water is to cleanse a person's palate before and after drinking an espresso shot.

Additionally there is also an espresso sidecar, which refers to a shot of espresso that is served alongside a cafe latte or cappuccino. In 2016, Starbucks launched a specialty beverage at some of their locations that included a beer, with an espresso sidecar meant to be poured into the beer.

== Etymology ==
The term likely originates from bartending culture. If a bartender overpoured, and therefore ended up with more of a drink than will fit in the special glass for that drink, it was common for them to serve the extra in a small glass beside the drink.

Meanwhile, it has become common to call anything served beside a drink a "sidecar". For example, a bar in Chicago serves a piece of chocolate with a mixed drink and calls it a "sidecar." Similarly, when diners serve milkshakes, there will typically be a little bit leftover that doesn't fit into a glass, this extra will be served alongside the milkshake in a metal mixing cup and is called a "sidecar."

== History ==
The tradition of serving water alongside coffee originated in Austria-Hungary. Initially, it served a practical purpose, providing a place for patrons to put their spoons after stirring, adhering to the etiquette norms of the time.

In 1873, Vienna completed the First Vienna Spring Watermain Pipeline, significantly improving the city's water quality. To showcase this clean water, coffee houses began serving a glass of tap water alongside their coffee.

This practice gained international attention during the 1873 Austrian World Expo, held the same year as the pipeline completion. Visitors from across Europe experienced coffee served with a water sidecar, and started drinking it, instead of placing their spoons into it. This exposure contributed to the spread of the tradition throughout Europe.

With the invention of espresso in Italy at the turn of the 20th century, Italian coffee houses also adopted the sidecar tradition.

During the mid-20th century, when coffee quality was often poor and overly bitter, the water served the functional purpose of rinsing away unpleasant aftertastes.

In contemporary coffee culture and third-wave coffee, the sidecar has evolved into a palate cleanser, typically consumed before the coffee to enhance appreciation of the espresso's complex flavors.

== See also ==
Sidecar (disambiguation)
