= SHPS =

Carewise Health
- Company type: Private
- Industry: Health care
- Founded: 1997; 29 years ago
- Headquarters: Louisville, Kentucky
- Key people: Merle Ryland (CEO); Kim Bateman (COO); Carolyn Baete (VP, Medicaid Operations); Mark Tatum (Vice President of Administrative Services); Randall Justice (Chief Legal Officer)
- Products: Employee health and wellness programs
- Number of employees: 1,000
- Website: www.carewisehealth.com

Carewise Health, formerly SHPS, Inc. (pronounced "ships") is a national provider of health improvement programs. The company is headquartered in Louisville, Kentucky. Primary data center operations are in Minneapolis. Carewise Health has satellite offices in Minneapolis, Philadelphia, Scottsdale, Arizona, Seattle, and Walnut Creek, California.

== History ==
The company was founded as SHPS in 1997 as a joint venture between SYKES Enterprises and Health Plan Services, and financed by Prudential Financial Services.

In December 1997, Prudential Financial Services and SYKES Enterprises, Incorporated formed SYKES Health Plan Services (SHPS), Inc.

In 2000, SHPS was purchased by Welsh, Carson, Anderson & Stowe, a private equity firm which focuses on information and business services, healthcare and communications.

In 2001, SHPS acquired CareWise, Inc., a provider of care management services to complement existing healthcare services offerings.

In 2003, SHPS acquired eBenX, Inc., a human resource and benefits administrator.

In 2004, SHPS acquired National Health Services, Inc. and Landacorp, Inc., two care management providers. In 2006, SHPS introduced its enhanced health management delivery model. In 2007, SHPS introduced a health risk engine to help employers strategically manage the clinical risk in their employee population. Also, in 2007, SHPS' Landacorp division released its CareRadius product suite, intended to simplify complex medical management processes and enable health plans to simplify work flow, improve health outcomes, and lower costs.

In April 2012, SHPS sold its Human Resource Solutions subsidiary, which administers Flexible spending accounts, to Automatic Data Processing. It retains ownership of the Carewise Health component.

In October 2012, the company sold LandaCorp for $38 million.

In December 2013, a new ownership group acquired Carewise.

== See also ==
- Health consumerism
- Outsourcing
- Healthcare
- Health economics
- Management consulting
- Third party administrator
