= Imagine360 =

- Formerly: ELAP Services LLC
- Type: Private
- Industry: Managed care
- Founded: 2003
- Founder: Steve Kelly; Woody Waters
- Headquarters: Wayne, Pennsylvania
- Key people: Jeff Bak, CEO
- Number of employees: 1,400 (2024)
- Website: imagine360.com

Imagine 360 (commonly stylized as Imagine360 and formerly called ELAP Services) is an American self-funded health care company for employers in the United States. The company provides reference-based pricing (RBP), has direct contracts with hospitals and is an alternative to U.S. health insurance plan providers.

== History ==
=== ELAP Services ===
ELAP Services LLC was founded in 2003 by Steve Kelly and Woody Waters, with Kelly serving as the company's CEO. ELAP was initially developed as a small health care benefits consulting firm. The firm offered a new form of employer-sponsored health insurance in the United States by selling plans using a RBP model, which determines the rate for healthcare services and procedures based on the actual cost of care.

In 2013, approximately 100 employers used ELAP Services, according to a report by The New York Times. By May 2015, that has grown to 200 employers, providing coverage for approximately 115,000 employees.

=== Imagine360 ===
In January 2022, Imagine Health merged with ELAP Services and third-party administrator Group & Pension Administrators to form Imagine360.

Imagine360's healthcare plans operate using RBP models, which typically determines a provider's payments from the U.S. Medicare rates, plus a premium. Through the RBP model, Imagine360 uses the hospital's published charges plus a 12% margin or Medicare fees plus 20%, which results in approximately 140% of Medicare's rates. The company has direct contracts with hospitals within the United States, including with the University of Pennsylvania Health System in Philadelphia.

In 2024, Imagine360 partnered with Ardent Health, an American healthcare company based in Nashville, Tennessee, to provide benefits to 23,000 employees and their dependents. In January 2025, the company acquired HealthFirst, Ardent Health's third-party administrator. In July 2025, it launched a new product called Complete Care, which also uses the RBP model but included a pharmacy benefit management solution, called Imagine360Rx, that provided drug discounts, including sourcing drugs from the United Kingdom and Canada.

As of January 2025, Imagine360 had approximately 1,000 clients. In July 2026, the company announced a new healthcare plan in collaboration with Health Rosetta, called Choice360, which integrated Health Rosetta's healthcare advisor support service. The plan is set to go live in 2027.

== Controversies ==
In January 2023, Imagine360 identified unusual activity within Citrix, its third-party file-sharing system. Imagine360 terminated access, reset passwords, confirmed the security of its environment and investigated the breach. Then in February 2023, Fortra, an American cybersecurity company and owner of the GoAnywhere platform that Imagine360 used for secure file-transfers, notified Imagine360 of a breach within GoAnywhere. Imagine360's investigation later determined that files were copied from both external platforms (Citrix and Fortra) sometime between January 28 and January 30, 2023.

In 2024, Imagine360 filed a notice with the Attorney General of Montana after discovering a 2023 data breach when an unauthorized party accessed certain company email accounts. The incident resulted in an unauthorized party being able to access consumers' sensitive information on May 10, 2024. On July 17, 2024, Imagine360 sent notification letters to all individuals whose information was affected by the data breach.
