= Glenn Canfield Jr. =

American metallurgist and businessman

Chairman of the Gregg County Republican Party
- In office 1991–2002

Personal details
- Born: September 20, 1935 Springfield, Illinois, US
- Died: January 30, 2006 (aged 70)
- Party: Republican
- Education: University of Illinois (BA); University of Texas at Tyler (MBA)
- Occupation: Metallurgist, businessman

Military service
- Allegiance: United States
- Branch/service: Navy
- Battles/wars: Korean War

Glenn Canfield Jr. (September 20, 1935 – January 30, 2006) was an American metallurgist and businessman.

== Early life ==
Glenn Canfield Jr. was born September 20, 1935, in Springfield, Illinois to Ruth K. and Glenn Canfield. He was the eldest of their four children. He served in the United States Navy, earning the rank of Aviation Structural Mechanic Third Class. He served in the Korean and China Sea areas and was discharged after the Korean War.

== Education ==
Canfield graduated from the University of Illinois in 1959 with a bachelor's degree in metallurgical engineering. He was second in his class of engineers. He earned an MBA from the University of Texas at Tyler in 1987.

== Career ==
After graduating from the University of Illinois, Canfield worked for Allegheny Ludlum Steel Co. in Brackenridge, Pennsylvania. The first computers were just being built. He did some work on the supercomputer ILLIAC, programming it with wires since chips had not been invented.

In December 1960, Canfield was let go by Allegheny Ludlum when the steel industry went into a funk and went to work for Westinghouse Electric building nuclear reactors for submarines and the first aircraft carrier, and for electrical power plants. His job was to make the fuel. His team designed a backyard reactor that could have supplied 10 homes for 20 years with very cheap power but access to needed uranium was unavailable.

In December 1963, Canfield went to work at Latrobe Steel as a metallurgist in heat treating and melting of tool steels.

Canfield spent the last 32 years of his life in Longview, Texas, working for Lone Star Steel and developing several businesses and products, in addition to his work with the Republican Party of Gregg County.

In 1986, Canfield formed The Plum Group, publishing monthly reports on the metal industry to steel suppliers. He also formed Thermo-Tech Co., a manufacturer of de-oxidation products for the steel industry.

His work included contributions to powder metallurgy, fusion bonding of nuclear materials for reactors in Naval and Power Generation, early work in powdered nuclear materials now used in modern reactors, development of high energy compaction of high alloy powders, seamless extrusions, and the removal of oxygen from liquid steels. He held two patents on de-oxidation products and methods.

== Politics ==
Having maintained an interest in political and economic issues since college, Mr. Canfield was active in the Republican Party of Gregg County and served as party chairperson from 1991 to 2002. During his term, Republicans captured all but two of the county-wide offices. He also published a monthly newsletter, raised funds for the party, recruited winning candidates, mobilized volunteer efforts, assisted every Republican in winning general elections, and maintained an open office for the use of all auxiliaries. Canfield also served on the State Republican Executive Committee representing Senate District One, having been elected by the state convention in 1998 and being unopposed at the 2000 state convention.

In 2002, Canfield received the Seed Grower Award for his contributions to the Republican Party in Texas.

== Death ==
Canfield died from cancer on January 30, 2006.
