= University of Texas at Tyler School of Medicine =

Proposed medical school of the University of Texas (Tyler)

Coordinates: 32°25′34″N 95°12′46″W

UT Tyler School of Medicine
- Type: Public medical school
- Established: 2022
- Parent institution: University of Texas at Tyler
- Affiliations: UT Health East Texas
- Dean: Sue Cox, MD
- Location: Tyler, Texas
- Website: medicine.uttyler.edu

The University of Texas at Tyler School of Medicine is a medical school in Tyler, Texas. The UT Tyler School of Medicine is the first medical school in East Texas, the seventh medical school in the University of Texas System, and 16th medical school in the state of Texas. Plans for the school were announced on 6 February 2020 by the UT System. The Board of Regents granted approval on 27 February 2020. The school is intended to help increase access to healthcare in the East Texas region. The school enrolled its first class of 40 students on July 1, 2023.

== History ==
In December 2019, the UT System Board of Regents unanimously agreed to merge The University of Texas Health Science Center at Tyler (UTHSCT) under The University of Texas at Tyler, creating a single unified institution. Two months later, the UT System formally announced its intention to establish a new medical school, the first in the East Texas region, that will be added under the new unified UT Tyler administration. The medical school is expected to open in 2023.

In November 2021, the UT System Board of Regents approved the purchase of land adjacent to UT Health East Texas' hospital in Tyler's medical district for construction of the school.

In February 2021, the Liaison Committee on Medical Education (LCME) classified UT Tyler as an applicant school for LCME accreditation.

In March 2022, representatives from the SACSCOC conducted their final walkthrough of each of the four UT Tyler campuses as part of the School of Medicine's accreditation.

In June 2022, LCME granted the school its preliminary accreditation status.

== Teaching Facilities ==
UT Health East Texas will serve as a teaching facility for the medical school.
