= Sidecar Health =

American health insurance technology company

Sidecar Health, Inc.
- Trade name: Sidecar Health
- Type: Private
- Industry: Health insurance
- Founded: 2018
- Founders: Patrick Quigley and Veronica Osetinsky
- Headquarters: El Segundo, California
- Key people: Patrick Quigley (CEO); Veronica Osetinsky (COO)
- Website: sidecarhealth.com

Sidecar Health, Inc. is a California-based health insurance company headquartered in El Segundo, California. Founded in 2018, the company offers medical plans for midsize and large companies nationwide.

== History ==
Patrick Quigley and Veronica Osetinsky founded Sidecar Health in El Segundo, California in 2018.

The company launched its first insurance product in 2019 in Texas, and by the end of that year, Sidecar Health had expanded to Alabama, Arkansas, Florida, Georgia, Kentucky, and North Carolina.

Sidecar Health initially raised $18 million in funding through venture capital firms GreatPoint Ventures and Morpheus Ventures. In July 2020, it raised $20 million in a new round of funding that included Comcast Ventures, Kauffman Fellows, and 23andMe CEO Anne Wojcicki. It closed its Series C funding round in January 2021, led by Drive Capital, at $125 million, which brought it to a $1 billion valuation, often referred to as unicorn status. In 2024, Sidecar Health raised $165 million in a Series D round led by Koch Disruptive Technologies, with participation from Cathay Innovation, GreatPoint Ventures, Morpheus, Drive Capital, Duke University, BOND, and Menlo Ventures.

As of 2024, the company began offering only fully Affordable Care Act (ACA)-compliant, large-group comprehensive major medical health plans, available as both fully insured and self-funded solutions, for employers with 51 or more employees.

In June 2025, Sidecar Health announced a partnership with Kettering Health, a faith-based health network serving Ohio, in which policyholders could receive access to Kettering's medical centers and outpatient facilities in the state. In September 2025, the company partnered with "value-based" health network Carrum Health to expand specialty care services for its members, including providers for surgical, cancer and substance use treatments. In November 2025, Sidecar Health partnered with Rula, a U.S. behavioral healthcare provider group that offers virtual therapist and psychiatrist services.

In September 2026, Quigley testified before the Texas House Committee to urge cutting healthcare costs in the state by 20%.

== Services ==
Sidecar Health uses a non-network health insurance model is based on elements from reference based pricing and cash prices against a reference-based reimbursement.

Sidecar Health's model is built on the idea that people should know the cost of care prior to a service and be incentivized to consider those costs in advance. In the app, members see what care costs before they get it. Members can see any licensed provider without restrictions like networks or prior authorization. For every covered service, the plan pays up to a maximum allowable amount (called a benefit amount) based on typical local prices. When members choose lower-cost care, they keep half the savings. Or they pay the difference if they choose care above the Benefit Amount.

Sidecar Health's current plans are designed to meet all federal and state requirements for major medical coverage under the ACA. These plans include full emergency protections under the No Surprises Act and cover all essential health benefits required of ACA-compliant insurers.
