= MedCath Corp. =

American health care company

MedCath Corporation
- Company type: Public (Nasdaq: MDTH)
- Industry: Health care
- Founded: 1988
- Headquarters: Charlotte, North Carolina, U.S.
- Key people: O. Edwin French, CEO; Joan McCanless, Senior Vice President and Chief Clinical and Compliance Officer; J. Arthur Parker, Executive Vice President and CFO
- Products: Cath labs, nuclear cardiology, cardiac hospitals
- Revenue: ▲$88.9 million USD (2010)
- Net income: ▲$48.465 million USD (2010)
- Number of employees: 3,299 (Sept. 30, 2009)
- Website: www.medcath.com

MedCath Corporation was an American cardiac health care company, publicly traded on the NASDAQ. The company was founded in 1988 as MedCath Partners, a for-profit corporation that offered cath lab, nuclear cardiology, and sleep medicine services. By 1998, the firm was known as Medcath, Inc. In 1994, the company began opening and operating acute care cardiac hospitals. Following passage of ObamaCare, which banned new physician-owned hospitals, MedCath sold its health care assets through a series of divestitures, liquidated, dissolved and distributed net proceeds to its shareholders.

In the early months of 2005, MedCath significantly shifted its corporate strategy. Instead of building cardiac hospitals and seeking physicians to invest in them, MedCath began partnering with existing hospitals or health care systems to expand existing cardiac care units or build new cardiac care units in existing hospitals. The strategy proved highly popular with stockholders, and the company stock price rose to $31.80 in September 2006 from a low of $14 a share in May 2006. Industry observers credited the shift in strategy to the company's chief executive officer, O. Edwin French, who took over leadership of MedCath in February 2006 (he'd previously been president of the acute care hospital division of Universal Health Services). French hired Phil Mazzuca (formerly with Iasis Healthcare) as chief operating officer. Art Parker, MedCath's chief financial officer, replaced French as chief executive officer following French's retirement in September 2011.

On March 1, 2010, MedCath announced that it would consider strategic options, including a possible sale of the company, or the sale of individual hospitals and assets. MedCath said its board had formed a strategic options committee of independent directors to consider alternatives. MedCath's decision to consider strategic options was driven by passing of federal health care legislation that included a ban on new physician-owned hospitals.

On October 4, 2010, MedCath announced it completed the sales involving its interest in two hospitals, Arizona Heart Hospital and Avera Heart Hospital of South Dakota. Arizona Heart Hospital was sold to Vanguard Health Systems for approximately $32.0 million. MedCath sold its one-third interest in Avera Heart Hospital of South Dakota for $20.0 million.

On November 2, 2010, MedCath announced it completed the sale of Heart Hospital of Austin to St. David's Healthcare Partnership, L.P. for approximately $83.8 million.

On January 3, 2011, MedCath announced it completed the sale of TexSan Heart Hospital, San Antonio, Texas, to Methodist Healthcare System of San Antonio for approximately $78.5 million.

On May 5, 2011, in a deal worth $25 million, MedCath announced that its sold most of its assets of its MedCath Partners division to a joint venture of LifePoint Hospitals and Duke University Health System.

On August 1, 2011, MedCath announced the sale of Heart Hospital of New Mexico to Lovelace Health Systems for approximately $119.0 million. MedCath's Board of Directors approved a liquidating distribution of $6.85 per share, to be paid October 13, 2011 to stockholders of record on October 6, 2011.

On August 1, 2011, MedCath announced the completion of the sale of its ownership interest in Arkansas Heart Hospital to AR-MED LLC based on a hospital valuation of $73.0 million.

On October 3, 2011, MedCath announced that it sold its interest in Louisiana Medical Center & Heart Hospital to Cardiovascular Care Group for approximately $23.0 million. MedCath also announced the sale of Hualapia Mountain Medical Center in Kingman, Arizona, to Kingman Regional Medical Center.

On December 1, 2011, MedCath announced it sold its ownership interest in Harlingen Medical Center and HMC Realty, LLC to Prime Healthcare Services for $9.0 million.

On September 22, 2011, MedCath announced its board of directors approved its first liquidating distribution of $6.85 per common share, paid on October 13, 2011. On August 28, 2012, MedCath announced its board of directors approved its second liquidating distribution of $6.33 per common share, paid on September 12, 2012. In total, MedCath made liquidating distributions of over $17.00 per common share to its shareholders.

On July 2, 2012, MedCath announced it sold its ownership interest in its remaining hospital, Bakersfield Heart Hospital, Bakersfiled, California, to Cardiovascular Care Group for approximately $34.0 million. MedCath also announced that its shareholders had approved its plan of complete liquidation and dissolution, and announced a liquidating distribution of between $5.75 and $6.25.

Effective September 21, 2012, as authorized by the board of directors and its stockholders, MedCath filed its Certificate of Dissolution with the State of Delaware.
