= University of Texas at Tyler Health Science Center =

Coordinates: 32.426°N 95.214°W

The University of Texas at Tyler Health Science Center

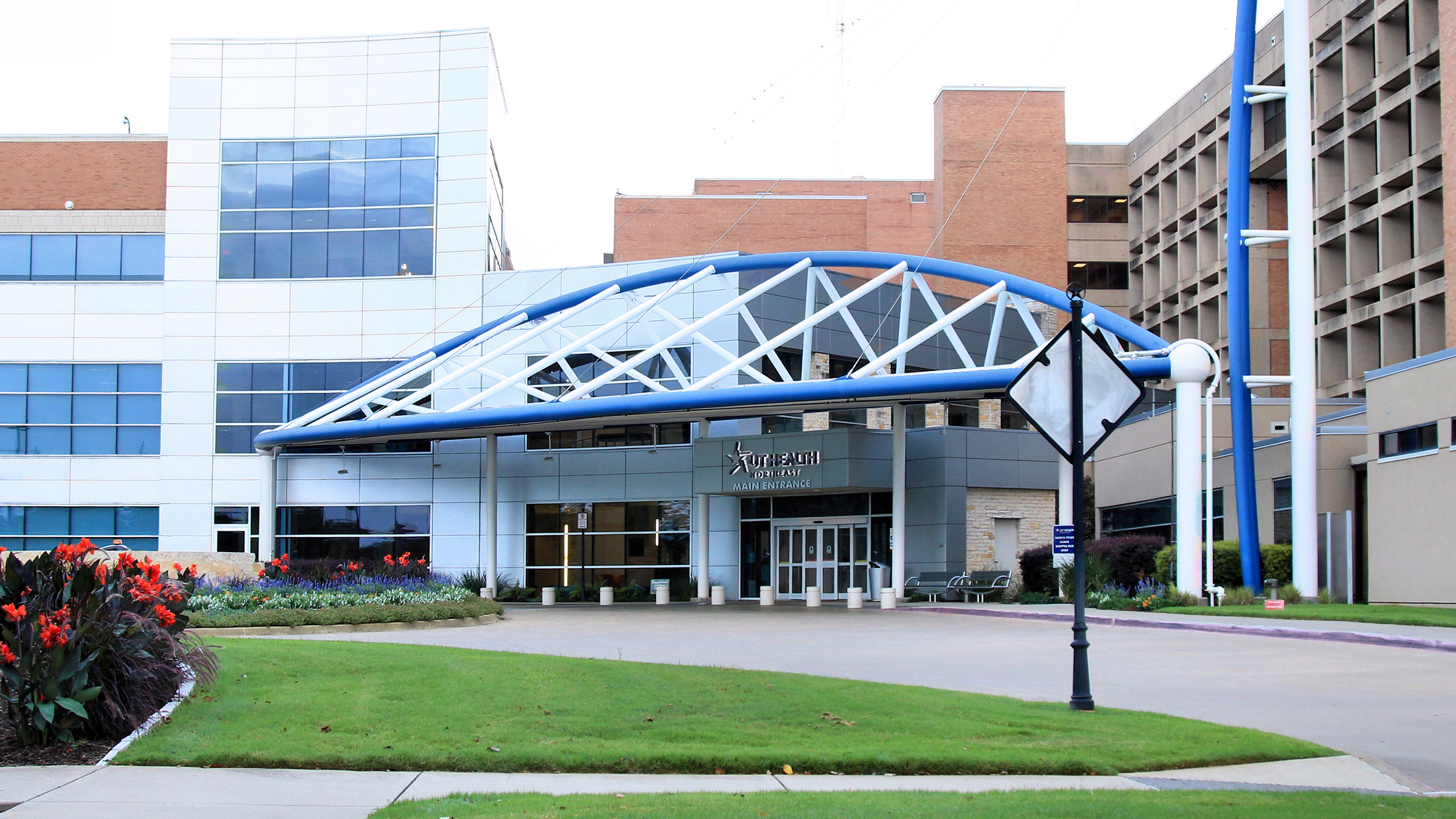
- Main entrance to UT Tyler Health Science Center

Geography
- Location: Tyler, Texas, United States

Organization
- Affiliated university: The University of Texas at Tyler

History
- Founded: 1947

Links
- Website: www.uthct.edu
- Lists: Hospitals in Texas

The University of Texas at Tyler Health Science Center (UT Tyler HSC, UTTHSC) is the health science education branch of the University of Texas at Tyler (UT Tyler) academic campus in Tyler, Texas on U.S. Highway 271. UT Tyler HSC was chartered in 1977 by the University of Texas System Board of Regents. UTHSCT is the only academic medical centre in Northeast Texas. UT Tyler HSC was originally named "East Texas Tuberculosis Sanitarium", established in 1947 as a tuberculosis treatment facility at the location of the retired World War II U.S. Army Infantry Training Base called Camp Fannin. It eventually became a state hospital known as the East Texas Chest Hospital. Following the 1977 acquisition by The University of Texas System, it became The University of Texas Health Science Center at Tyler (UTSHCT).

The institution served Northeast Texas, like UT Health Northeast, until the 2018 expansion of clinical operations through a merger with the former East Texas Medical Center to form the clinical affiliate, UT Health East Texas (UTHET).

== Academics ==
While research has long been a part of its history, residency programs started in 1985 with Family Practice. With a focus on training health professionals, an occupational medicine residency program was added in 1994, an internal medicine residency in 2010, and rural family medicine and psychiatry in 2016. With the addition of the clinical affiliate, UT Health East Texas, plans are underway to extend residency programs in general surgery, trauma surgery, and expand the internal medicine program. In addition to the graduate medical education, in 2012 the School of Medical Biological Sciences was established, offering a Master of Science degree in biotechnology. The first class began in August 2012 and the first degree was awarded in 2013. In 2016, the School of Community and Rural Health was established, offering a master's degree in Public Health (2017) and a master's in Health Administration (2019).

The UT System announced on February 6, 2020, their intention to establish School of Medicine at UT Tyler. Three weeks later the board unanimously approved the plan to move forward with planning. The System also announced it had accepted an $80 million donation from the legacy charity of UT Health East Texas, the East Texas Medical Center Foundation to aid with planning and starting costs, with a hope to begin instruction in fall of 2023.

On January 4, 2021, UT Tyler and UTHSCT officially merged to become one institution known as UT Tyler. The unified institution is led by former UTHSCT President Kirk A. Calhoun, M.D.

== Research ==
Research centers and institutes at UT Tyler HSC include the Center for Biomedical Research, Heartland TB Center, Northeast Texas Consortium (NETnet), The Center for Population Health, Analytics and Quality Advancement (formerly Northeast Texas Center for Rural Community Health), the Public Health Lab of East Texas, Southwest Center for Agricultural Health, Injury Prevention and Education, Texas Institute for Occupational Safety and Health® (TIOSH®), and the Texas Lunch Injury Institute.

Clinical Partner UT Health East Texas (UTHET), is a network of hospitals, clinics, an EMS/Air 1 service, rehabilitation centers, freestanding emergency centers, urgent care facilities, fitness centers, and other locations.

== Locations ==
Affiliate UT Health operates clinical practices at these locations.

- The Health Science Center at UT Tyler
- UT Health Tyler (Downtown)
- UT Health Olympic Center Tyler
- UT Health Athens
- UT Health Carthage
- UT Health Henderson
- UT Health Jacksonville
  - UT Health Olympic Center Jacksonville
- UT Health Pittsburg
  - UT Health Olympic Center Pittsburg
- UT Health Quitman
- UT Health East Texas Behavioral Health Center
- UT Health East Texas Rehabilitation Hospital
- UT Health East Texas Specialty Hospital
- UT Health Olympic Center Cedar Creek Lake
- UT Health Olympic Center Hideaway Lake
- UT Health Olympic Center Lake Palestine

== Camp Fannin ==
A Camp Fannin Memorial stands today on the campus.
