= University of Texas at Tyler =

Public university in Tyler, Texas, US

Coordinates: 32°19′02″N 95°15′07″W

The University of Texas at Tyler
- Former names: Tyler State College (1971–1975); Texas Eastern University (1975–1979)
- Motto: Disciplina Praesidium Civitatis (Latin)
- Motto in English: "The cultivated mind is the guardian genius of democracy"
- Type: Public research university
- Established: June 10, 1971; 55 years ago
- Parent institution: University of Texas System
- Accreditation: SACS
- Academic affiliations: Space-grant
- Endowment: $212.5 million (FY2024) (UT Tyler only) $47.47 billion (FY2024) (system-wide)
- Budget: $634.8 million (FY2025)
- President: Julie V. Philley
- Provost: Barbara Haas
- Academic staff: 908 (fall 2023)
- Administrative staff: 112 (fall 2024)
- Total staff: 2,919 (fall 2024)
- Students: 11,602 (fall 2025)
- Undergraduates: 7,670 (fall 2024)
- Postgraduates: 2,589 (fall 2024)
- Location: Tyler, Texas, United States
- Campus: Midsize City, 259 acres (1.05 km^{2})
- Other campuses: Houston; Longview; Palestine
- Newspaper: Patriot Talon
- Colors: Orange, white, and blue
- Nickname: Patriots
- Sporting affiliations: NCAA Division II – Lone Star
- Mascot: Eagle
- Website: www.uttyler.edu

The University of Texas at Tyler (UT Tyler) is a public research university in Tyler, Texas, United States. Founded in 1971, it is a part of the University of Texas System.

UT Tyler consists of six professional colleges and one traditional college of arts and sciences, offering over 90 academic degree programs at the bachelor, master, and doctoral levels. The University of Texas at Tyler is accredited by the Southern Association of Colleges and Schools. The university had a fall 2025 student body preliminary enrollment of 11,602.

== History ==
The University of Texas at Tyler was founded in 1971 as Tyler State College. The school was renamed Texas Eastern University in 1975 and then joined the University of Texas System in 1979 as a result of action by the 66th Texas Legislature. Initially, UT Tyler was a "senior" level institution ("senior" as compared to community or junior colleges), teaching only upper division undergraduate courses for juniors & seniors, as well as graduate level courses, and granting bachelor's and master's degrees. Thus, until 1998, all U.T. Tyler undergraduate students were transfer students from other institutions. In 1997, the 75th Texas Legislature passed House Bill 1795, signed into law by Governor George W. Bush, authorizing the school to add classes for freshmen and sophomore students. As of the Fall semester 1998, UT Tyler became a 4-year and graduate institution.

In late 2019, the UT System Board of Regents unanimously agreed to merge the University of Texas Health Science Center at Tyler (UTHSCT) under the University of Texas at Tyler (UTT), creating a single unified institution. Two months later, the UT system formally announced its intention to establish a new medical school that will be added under the new unified UT Tyler administration. It will be the first medical school in the East Texas region. The plan was approved by the university's accreditor, the Southern Association of Colleges and Schools Commission on Schools, in 2020. UTHSCT retains its status as a health-related institution but came under the administration of UT Tyler.

The merger officially began in January 2021. The board of regents installed Kirk A. Calhoun as president of the newly aligned UT Tyler and UTHSCT. The medical school opened in 2023.

Official name	Official abbreviations	Location	Founded	Joined system	Merged	Refs
The University of Texas at Tyler	UT Tyler	Tyler	1971	1979	2021 (merged as The University of Texas at Tyler)	
The University of Texas Health Science Center at Tyler	UTHSCT UT Health Tyler	Tyler	1943	1977	2021 (merged as The University of Texas at Tyler)	

== University Academy ==
UT Tyler's College of Education and Psychology has operated the UT Tyler University Academy since its founding in 2012. The University Academy has campuses on UT Tyler's Campus, on UT Tyler's Longview University Center, and on UT Tyler's Palestine Campus.

University Academy offers grades K-12, with a focus on STEM and most students graduating with 30 credit hours from UT Tyler. The Schools also serve as labs for students of the UTeach program and for faculty of the College of Education and Psychology.

== Academics ==
The university is home to five academic colleges and three schools:

- The Ben and Maytee Fisch College of Pharmacy
- College of Arts and Sciences
- College of Education and Psychology
- College of Engineering
- School of Health Professions
- School of Medicine
- School of Nursing
- Soules College of Business

Additionally, UT Tyler is home to an Honors College and Graduate School.

== Rankings ==
Academic rankings

National
- Forbes: 493
- U.S. News & World Report: 361 (tie)
- Washington Monthly: 260

Undergraduate demographics as of Fall 2023
Race and ethnicity	Total	
White	50%	
Hispanic	27%	
Black	11%	
Asian	4%	
Two or more races	4%	
International student	2%	
Unknown	1%	Economic diversity
Low-income (Note: The percentage of students who received an income-based federal Pell grant intended for low-income students.)	39%	
Affluent (Note: The percentage of students who are a part of the American middle class at the bare minimum.)	61%	

In addition to its undergraduate programs, UT Tyler offers doctoral studies in integrated biomedical sciences, nursing, pharmacy, psychology, and human resource development. It also offers a selective four-year honors program for high-achieving undergraduate students of all majors. For the Fall 2020 semester, UT Tyler had a 92% acceptance rate. The U. S. News & World Report rankings released in 2023 placed UT Tyler #331-#440 in National Universities, tied for #282 in Top Performers on Social Mobility, #169-#227 in Top Public Schools, and tied for #42 in Best Undergraduate Engineering Programs at schools where doctorates are not offered.

== Campus ==
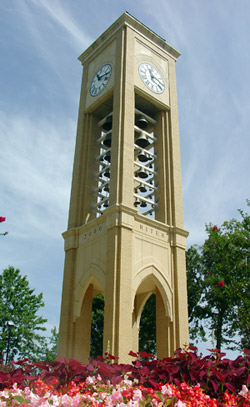
The Riter Tower

UT Tyler's main campus is located on 204 acres (0.83 km^{2}), just inside the eastern city limits of Tyler, Texas. Many buildings and sports facilities have been constructed at the main campus since 1996.

One of the most prominent features of the UT Tyler campus is the Riter Tower, an 88-foot (27 m) instrument featuring 57 bells. There is a fitness center on campus, as well as the R. Don Cowan Fine and Performing Arts Center.

There are several on-campus housing options. There is a green space called Patriot Plaza for recreation and events, and there is an Alumni House.

== Research ==
With over $29 million in annual research expenditures, UT Tyler is classified among "R2: Doctoral Universities – High research activity".

== Funding ==
UT Tyler has access to the State of Texas's Permanent University Fund (PUF), with over $32 billion in assets as of 2022. These funds are primarily used for infrastructure improvements and expansion, as well as the repayment of debts.

The university also has its own endowment worth $212.5 million as of fiscal year 2024. Furthermore, UT Tyler is part of the University of Texas System, which has an endowment of $47.47 billion as of fiscal year 2024, the most of any public university system in the world and second only to Harvard.

== Debate ==
UT Tyler competes in the National Parliamentary Debate Association. The team has competed in the national finals several times.

== Athletics ==
UT Tyler Women's Basketball Team

UT Tyler competes in the Lone Star Conference of the NCAA's Division II. It completed its three-year transition from Division III in 2021. Both the men's and women's sports teams are referred to as the Patriots.

The school does not have a football program.

UT Tyler participates in the following fifteen sports: Men's sports include baseball, basketball, cross country, golf, soccer, tennis and track & field, while women's sports include basketball, cross country, golf, soccer, softball, tennis, track & field and volleyball.

Since 2005, UT Tyler student-athletes have won 29 American Southwest Conference Championships, 29 ASC East Division championships, made 32 team appearances in the NCAA postseason and had 26 students earn All-America or Academic All-America Honors.

In 2025, UT Tyler softball alumna Sam Schott was named the NCAA Woman of the Year, becoming the first UT Tyler athlete to receive the honor. She is the fifth Division II athlete, the third Texas athlete, and the second softball athlete to earn the award.

== Media ==
Besides its newspaper, the Patriot Talon, UT Tyler has a recording studio used to produce podcasts such as Ask Dr. Ross, which is for students about navigating life at UT Tyler.

== Notable alumni ==
- Glenn Canfield Jr. – former president of Thermo-Tech Co., Chairperson of the Republican Party of Gregg County, Texas
- Bryan Hughes – Republican member of the Texas House of Representatives from Wood County since 2003
- Brittany Mahomes – co-owner of Kansas City NWSL and wife of NFL quarterback Patrick Mahomes, played soccer at UT Tyler before a brief professional career
- Brandon Rhyder – Texas Country/Red Dirt singer
- Craig Tiley – CEO of Tennis Australia and Director of the Australian Open

== See also ==
- Rodney H. Mabry, third president of The University of Texas at Tyler for 18 years (retired, 2016)
