= Zeen (mobility device) =

Sit-to-stand mobility device

Zeen is a mobility device produced by Exokinetics. It combines features of both a walker and a wheelchair. Zeen's power lift raises the user from a seated position to full standing.

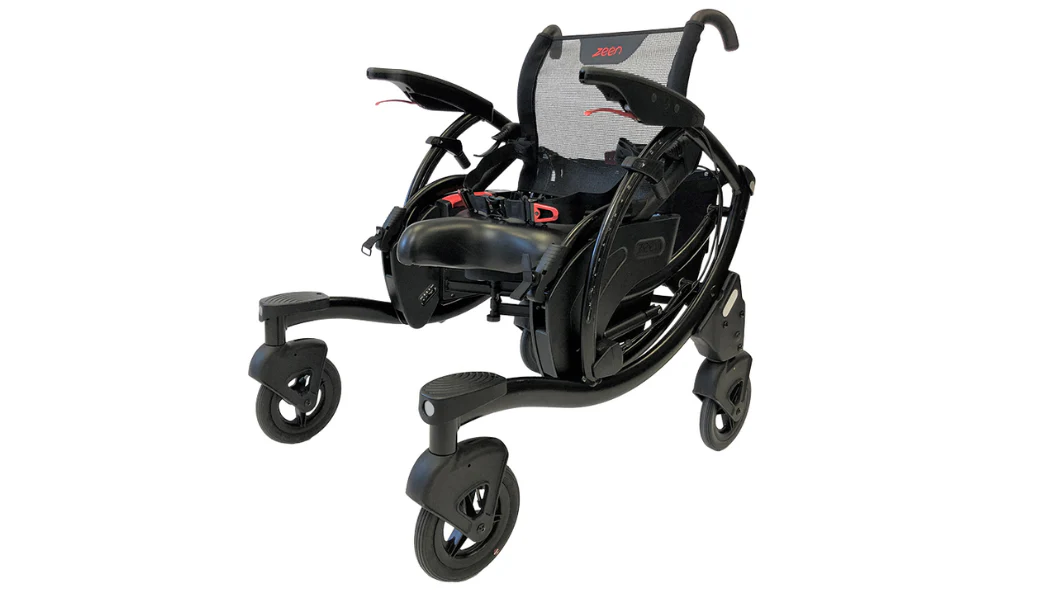
The Zeen mobility device by Exokinetics, Inc., shown in seated position

== Background ==
Exokinetics was founded in July 2016 by inventor Garrett Brown and co-inventor Chris Fawcett.

Brown was inspired to create the Zeen when his father developed mobility limitations and faced a choice only between a walker or a wheelchair. Dissatisfied with what he characterized as "antiquated technology," Brown assembled a team of inventors to design a new class of mobility solution. It took nearly a decade of development and tinkering, starting with early prototypes, before Brown and a small team opened an office in West Chester, Pa. in 2018 to manufacture and market the product.

== Design and technology ==
The Zeen uses a proprietary, motor-free zero-gravity lift mechanism derived from the same gas-spring technology that Garrett Brown developed for the Steadicam. This technology allows a user to support up to 75% of their body weight, and raise them from a seated position to standing without electrical power. The device takes its name from the draisine, a forerunner to the modern bicycle, reflecting its role as a vehicle for assisted independent movement.

The device allows users to move between five modes: seated, standing, walking, coasting, and a raised "barstool" position that enables eye-level social interaction. Brown has described the value of upright posture as beneficial for cardiac health, bone density, the digestive system, and psychological well-being, noting that being "up among your fellow humans" is one of the things users appreciate most about the device.

Key specifications include:

- Dimensions (seated): 33.5″L × 25.2″W × 36.8″H
- Dimensions (maximum standing): 33.5″L × 25.2″W × 51.3″H
- Dimensions (folded): 33.5″L × 11.0″W × 38″H
- Weight: 40 lb (18 kg)
- Weight capacity: Up to 325 lbs (model-dependent)
- User weight range: 50–250 lbs (children and adults)
- Control options: Standard two-handed; optional single-handed control available

The Zeen is designed to leave the user's hands and arms free during movement. It can fold compactly (less than 12" wide) to fit in a car, and can be gate-checked for air travel.

== Intended users ==
The Zeen is indicated for individuals with limited strength, balance, or endurance. It is often used by older adults at risk of falling and veterans with mobility-affecting disabilities, however many "Zeeners" have conditions including Parkinson's disease, multiple sclerosis, cerebral palsy, ataxia, stroke, spinal stenosis, or spina bifida. By promoting weight-bearing on the legs and upright posture, the device is intended to support cardiovascular health, muscle tone, digestion, and psychological well-being.

Early users have included people living with multiple sclerosis, Ehlers–Danlos syndrome, and other chronic conditions. Amy Gurowitz, an MS patient from Montclair, New Jersey, described the device as allowing her to walk with her husband without worrying about how far she could go. Musician Anomie Fatale, who lives with Ehlers–Danlos syndrome, said the Zeen allowed her to work on building muscle mass without having to choose between physical safety and mobility. NBC10 Philadelphia also featured the device in a segment where Brown discussed how the Zeen addresses the gap between walkers and wheelchairs for people who still retain some degree of mobility.

== Recognition ==
In 2023, Time magazine named the Zeen one of its Best Inventions of the Year in the Accessibility category.

The Zeen was featured on CBS Saturday Morning in January 2023, where Brown demonstrated the device and discussed its origins and potential impact for people with limited mobility. The segment was produced by reporter Michelle Miller and posted to the official CBS Mornings YouTube channel, where it has accumulated over 10,000 views.

In August 2023, the Zeen was featured on Here & Now, the national NPR program produced by WBUR, where it was described as a life-changing device for early users.

Brown also gifted a Zeen to Pope Francis after observing the Pope's mobility challenges in news reports. The Vatican accepted the donation following a formal vetting process, and Brown later reported the device had been placed in the Pope's apartment. A Zeen was also used by filmmaker Francis Ford Coppola while shooting a film, and a signed unit was returned to Exokinetics.

Bloomberg Businessweek covered Exokinetics and the Zeen in November 2016, describing it as a device with "the potential to improve quality of life" and profiling Brown and co-founder Chris Fawcett as the inventors behind the then-early-stage startup.

== Government and veteran access ==
In July 2025, Exokinetics announced that the Zeen had been added to the VA Federal Supply Schedule, making it directly available to veterans through the VA medical program and other government employees.

CEO and former Air Force officer and medical devices industry veteran, Rick Sherak, described the listing as "a huge step" in delivering the device to service members and veterans.

== Funding and company ==
Exokinetics has raised more than $8 million in venture funding. Notable investors include Select Medical, a post-acute care provider, and Founders Fund, whose portfolio includes Airbnb, Spotify, and SpaceX. A Series B round was launched in November 2022 via the SeedInvest crowdfunding platform.

In March 2024, Rick Sherak joined as CEO to lead the company's next phase of market growth.

Exokinetics operates the Project ELEVATE Mobility (PEM) charitable foundation, which offers dollar-for-dollar matching grants to help consumers purchase the device.
