= T18 =

T18 may refer to:

== Aircraft ==
- Slingsby T.18 Hengist, a British glider
- Thorp T-18, an American homebuilt aircraft

== Armoured vehicles ==
- T18 Boarhound, an American armoured car
- T18 howitzer motor carriage, an American self-propelled gun
- T-18 tank, a Soviet tank

== Rail and transit ==
=== Lines ===
- Annapolis Road Line, of the Washington Metropolitan Area Transit Authority
- T18 line, of the Stockholm Metro
- T17/18 Beijing–Mudanjiang through train

=== Rolling stock ===
- GER Class T18, a British steam locomotive
- Prussian T 18, a tank locomotive
- Tatra T18, a Czehoslovak draisine

=== Stations ===
- Hara Station (Nagoya), Aichi, Japan
- Hibarigaoka Station (Hokkaido), Sapporo, Hokkaido, Japan
- Orange Town Station, Sanuki, Kagawa Prefecture, Japan
- Tenjimbashisuji Rokuchōme Station, Osaka, Japan
- Urayasu Station (Chiba), Japan

== Other ==
- Edwards syndrome, or trisomy 18
- Estonian national road 18
- T18, French television channel
- T18 road (Tanzania)
- German torpedo boat T18
- Toyota T-18, a Toyota Corolla model sold in Australia
