= U.S. HealthWorks =

Defucnt American health care provider network

U.S. HealthWorks, Inc.
- Industry: Health care
- Founded: 1995
- Headquarters: Addison, Texas, U.S.
- Area served: United States
- Services: Occupational safety and health

U.S. HealthWorks, Inc. was an American healthcare provider network headquartered in Valencia, California.

The firm was a wholly owned, for-profit subsidiary of Dignity Health. In February 2018, it combined with Concentra in a transaction between Dignity Health and Select Medical.

== History ==
The firm was started in 1995. In 2001, it purchased the occupational medicine division of HealthSouth for a reported $30 million. By adding 99 centers and more than doubling U.S. HealthWorks operations, it became one of the largest provider networks in the United States, along with Concentra.

The firm moved its headquarters from Alpharetta, Georgia, to Valencia, California, in November 2007.

Dignity Health acquired U.S. HealthWorks in 2012, the financial terms were not disclosed.

In 2019, the company was acquired by Concentra.

=== Partnerships ===
In June 2013, it began a partnership with Indiana University Health for collaboration in providing occupational health services, giving it the assets of eight free-standing IU Health clinics in the Indianapolis area.

=== Acquisitions ===
U.S. HealthWorks acquired two Technimed Occupational Medicine healthcare centers in May 2010.

In February 2011, it acquired two medical centers in south Florida. In July 2011, it acquired three NorthWorks Occupational Health Centers in the Minneapolis-St. Paul region. In October 2011, it acquired four Nashville-based medical centers and seven worksite locations operated by Tennessee Urgent Care Associates. Priority Care Inc., headquartered in Erie, Pennsylvania, was acquired in November 2012.

In January 2013, it acquired three Advanced Occupational Medicine Specialists (AOMS) healthcare centers in the Chicago region. In June 2013, it acquired the assets of seven OHS-Compcare clinics and two worksites in the Kansas City area.

In June 2014, it acquired the California Occupational Clinic in Los Angeles. In June 2014, it acquired five Atlanta-area centers from Choice Care Occupational Medicine and Orthopedics.

The company acquired Austin, Texas-based Pro Med Urgent Care in September 2015.

In 2016, U.S. HealthWorks acquired Lakeside Occupation Medical Centers. U.S. HealthWorks purchased Premier Comp Medical Group in March 2017.

== Regulatory action ==
In 2003, U.S. HealthWorks agreed to pay $900,000 to the California Department of Insurance following a three-year investigation of 25 facilities in California. It was alleged that the firm did not always file a "Doctor's First Report of Injury" as required by California law, which would distort the risk experience used by insurance underwriters to calculate premiums. In the agreement, the firm did not admit liability.
