= Rocco Ortenzio =

American businessman and philanthropist

Rocco Ortenzio was an Italo American businessman and philanthropist, who during his career founded several health care companies. He died on October 26, 2024.

== Business career ==
Ortenzio co-founded Select Medical Corporation in 1996 with his son, Robert. Select Medical "operate[s] hospitals within hospitals," and "provide[s] acute long-term care to critically ill patients." Beginning in February 1997, Ortenzio held the position of chairman and chief executive officer for Select Medical: he held these positions until that September. In the same year, he was awarded the Business Achievement Award from the West Shore Chamber of Commerce. Since that time, he has served as its executive chairman. In 1998, Select Medical bought fellow health care provider Intensiva for approximately $110 million. In February 2010, it was estimated that both Rocco and his son had made "about $200 million from salary, benefits and share sales since founding Select in November 1996." In September 2009, they sold 90% of Select Medical to the public through shares, but retained around $200 million worth of the company, or 10 percent.

In 1995, Rocco Ortenzio sold his company Continental Medical Systems to Horizon Healthcare Corporation for $502 million in stock. He had founded Continental in 1986, and held the positions of chairman and chief executive officer until July 1995. After the merger, he became the vice chairman of Horizon, which became one of the largest companies of its kind in the U.S. Horizon/CMS was eventually acquired by HealthSouth in 1997.

== Philanthropy and community involvement ==
Ortenzio was also made a Knight of the Order of St. Sylvester, on October 21, 2007. Ortenzio and his son, Robert, along with Select Medical, made the largest-ever private donation ($5.2 million) to the Harrisburg University of Science and Technology.

== Political activities ==
Ortenzio donated $1 million to Restore Our Future, Mitt Romney's Super PAC, in 2012. Ortenzio has also contributed to Bob Casey, Jr., Pat Toomey, Lee Terry, Bob Corker, and other members of Congress.
