= Concentra =

American health care establishment

Concentra Health Services

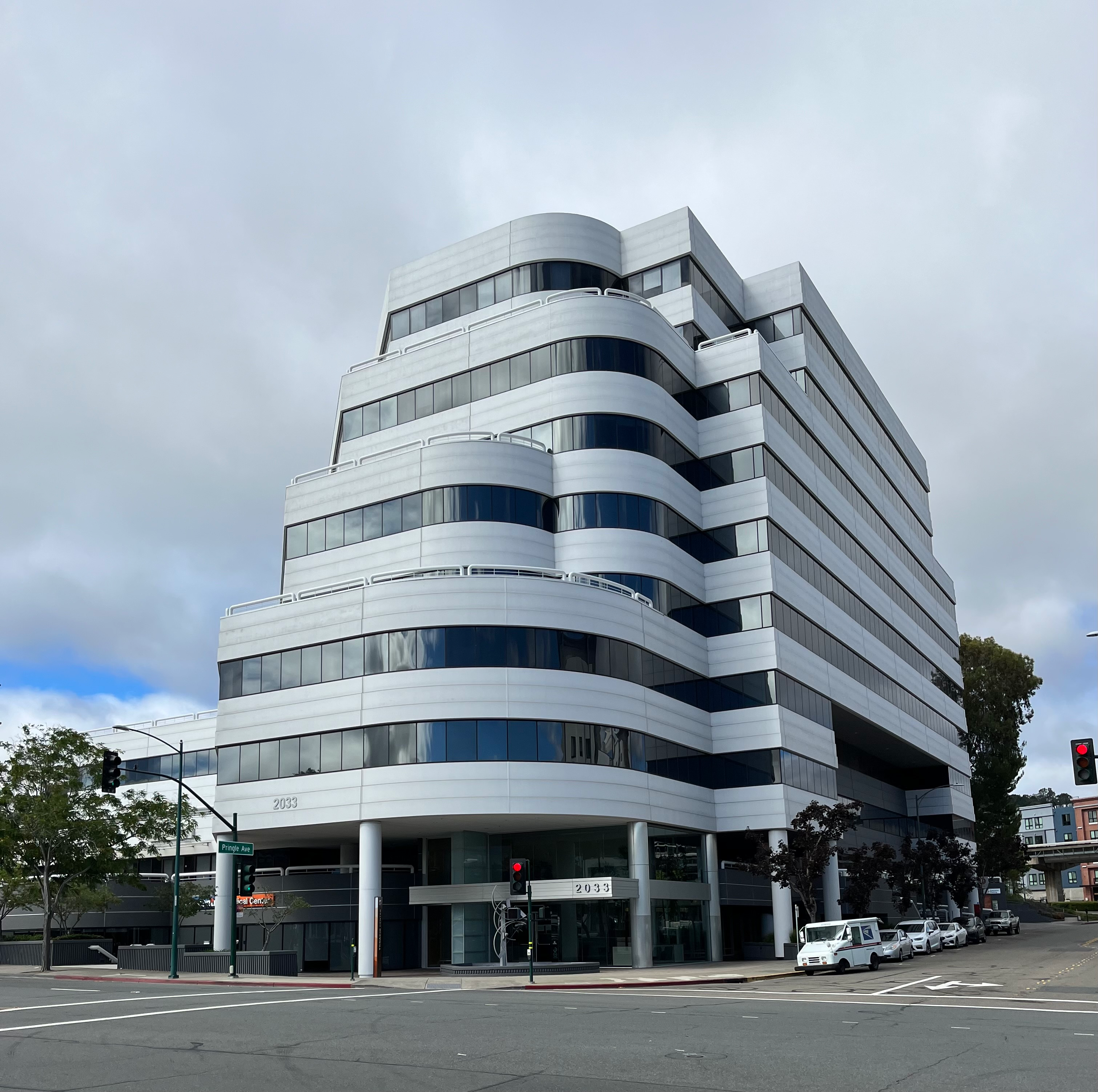
- A Concentra medical center
- Type: Subsidiary
- Industry: Health care
- Founded: 1979
- Headquarters: Addison, Texas, United States
- Key people: Keith Newton (Chairman, President and Chief Executive Officer); John R. Anderson, D.O. (Chief Medical Officer and Executive Vice President)
- Products: Occupational Medicine; Urgent Care; Physical Therapy
- Revenue: $1 billion (2015)
- Number of employees: 12,000
- Website: concentra.com

Concentra Inc., is an American health care establishment centered around occupational health. It was founded in 1979 in Amarillo, Texas, and the headquarters of the corporation is in Addison, Texas. It runs 627 occupational health centers and 410 onsite health clinics at employer worksites across 47 states. According to the Bureau of Labor Statistics, Concentra treats one out of every seven occupational injuries in the United States. It is currently a publicly traded company with over 80% of the shares owned by Select Medical.

== History ==
=== 1979–2000 ===
While Concentra is currently the product of a number of mergers, the original company was OccuSystems Inc., founded in Amarillo, Texas by Dr. Richard Rhem in 1979. After completing his residency and moving to Buffalo, Wyoming to practice family medicine for three years, he opened a practice in the underserved Amarillo, which he thought presented an opportunity. According to Rehm, he adopted a philosophy of rather than "trying to maximize the dollar volume per patient," instead "trying to minimize the dollar volume per patient." This benefited employers, who got employees back to work quickly, and allowed him to profit by taking a large caseload.

The early company got beneficial exposure from an association with a television health program syndicated on ABC in several states. By 1990, after a series of new clinics and acquisitions, the company operated four clinics, and Rhem decided to try to expand out of a fear of being overrun by larger, consolidating companies. Rehm hired a CEO, who acquired $35 million in seed money from venture capitalists Welsh, Carson, Anderson & Stowe and the Sprout Group, and the company began to buy up other clinics. By 1992, only two years later, it owned about 50 in seven states. The company continued expanding and acquiring investments, and by 1997 operated about 110 centers in 16 states.

In 1997, the company merged with Boston-based CRA Managed Care, a cost containment and case-management company of similar size which also operated about 100 locations. It now did business as Concentra Managed Care, a publicly listed firm, under the parent company Concentra Inc.. This gave it operations in 49 states, D.C., and Canada, and allowed it to operate as a "one-stop shop" for worker's compensation services. The company subsequently acquired TotalMed, an online medical transcription company; First Notice Systems Inc., an outsourced call reporting company; and Preferred Payment Systems, a bill review company. The acquisition of First Notice Systems was important for the business because making sure that injuries were reported with 24 hours reduced medical costs and got workers back to work more quickly.

=== 2000–2010 ===
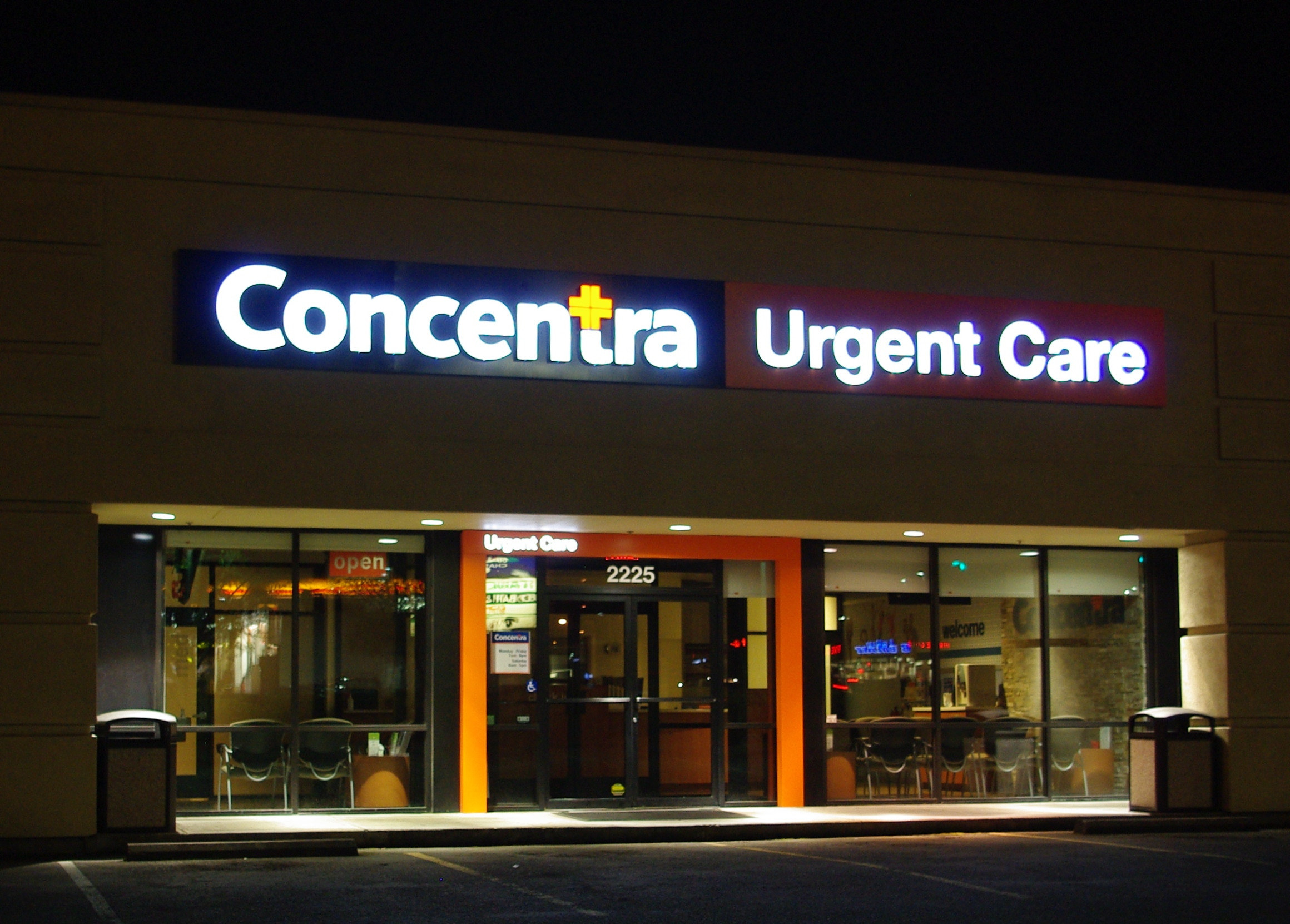
An urgent care location in Hillsboro, Oregon

The company agreed to be taken private again in 1999 by Welsh, Carson, Anderson & Stowe, who owned the company through the purpose-made entity Yankee Acquisition Corporation. Having continued expansion, by the end of that year the company operated 233 medical centers. In November 2001 the company acquired National Healthcare Resources Inc., a consulting company to the automobile insurance and workers compensation industries. In 2002 it also acquired EM3 Inc., a provider of web content management products; and OccMed Services, which developed a web-based integrated prevention and injury management product.

Following a series of sale deals in 2006 and 2007, Concentra restricted its focus on occupational health, medical center growth, and wellness and preventive care.

The firm began an urgent care program in 2007.

=== 2010–present ===
In December 2010, Humana announced its acquisition of Concentra for approximately $790 million. Welsh, Carson, Anderson & Stowe, a New York City–based private equity firm, had previously owned a majority of Concentra's equity since 1999. Humana made this acquisition as part of an attempt to expand into primary care practices and medical services organizations. According to Humana, in the years preceding 2015 it chose to focus more on primary care than on Concentra's work on occupational injuries. In a press release, Humana stated that "Concentra's operations did not ultimately align with Humana's strategy as well as we had originally anticipated."

In June 2015 Humana sold Concentra shares to a joint venture between Select Medical Holdings Corporation (Select Medical) and Welsh, Carson, Anderson & Stowe, a private equity fund, for approximately $1.06 billion in cash. The deal called for Select Medical to own 50.1% of the stock, while Welsh, Carson, Anderson & Stowe would own 49.9%. In February 2018, Concentra combined with U.S. HealthWorks in a transaction between Select Medical and Dignity Health.

In December 2023, Select Medical announced an intent to spin off Concentra, and in June 2024, Concentra filed an initial public offering under the symbol "CON". Select Medical is planned to retain at least 80% of the stock in the company.

== Litigation ==
In 2005, a class action lawsuit was brought against Concentra and its subsidiaries, Concentra Managed Care MCO and Focus Healthcare Management PPO. It alleged that Concentra and its subsidiaries engaged in silent PPO activities and unfair repricing tactics. The lawsuit was initiated on behalf of First State Orthopedics and all U.S. physicians with workers' compensation or car accident bills that had been repriced by Concentra or its subsidiaries. The complaint was based on allegations of "breach of contract/duty of good faith and fair dealing, tortious interference with existing and prospective contractual relations and unjust enrichment".

A $3.7 million settlement was reached, with Concentra agreeing to pay $2,000 to each plaintiff as well as legal expenses. However, the settlement terms were criticized by many of the doctors, supported by medical professional associations, such as the American Medical Association (AMA) and the Connecticut State Medical Society (CSMS). The AMA filed an objection with the court, claiming that "the defendants' claimed modifications are illusory, impossible of verification, and in any event insufficient to rectify the [said] losses." The terms of the settlement, according to CSMS, "provide very little relief to aggrieved physicians" and would require them to "give up virtually all legal claims they may have" that are tangentially related to the claims in this suit. CSMS recommended that doctors who were substantially aggrieved consider opting out of the class action lawsuit to retain the option of pursuing an individual claim against the company in the future.

In 2009, Concentra was part of a class action workers' compensation case, Josephine Gianzero et al. v. Wal-Mart Stores Inc. et al, alongside Wal-Mart and its insurance adjuster Claims Management Inc. (CMI). The lawsuit was filed in Colorado federal court on behalf of 13,521 Wal-Mart employees who had received treatment for work-related injuries. According to Denver Business Journal, the workers sued Wal-Mart, CMI, and Concentra for "interfer[ing] with and limit[ing] the independent judgment of certain medical providers who treated injured workers employed by [Wal-Mart] in Colorado who sustained on-the-job injuries". After fighting the charges for three years, Judge Robert Blackburn approved a settlement of $8 million, requiring Concentra to pay $4 million, through its insurer, and Wal-Mart and CMI to pay the other half. Concentra was ordered to pay $520 to each Wal-Mart employee that had been treated at one of its offices and $50 to employees who were treated at other clinics.
