= Tatra T18 =

Czehoslovak armored draisine

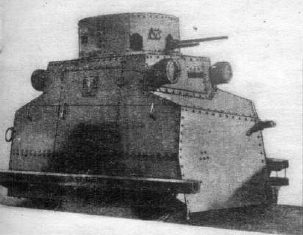
Tatra T18

The Tatra T18 was a Czechoslovak draisine designed and manufactured by Tatra in the 1920s.
