= Draisine =

Human-powered rail vehicle

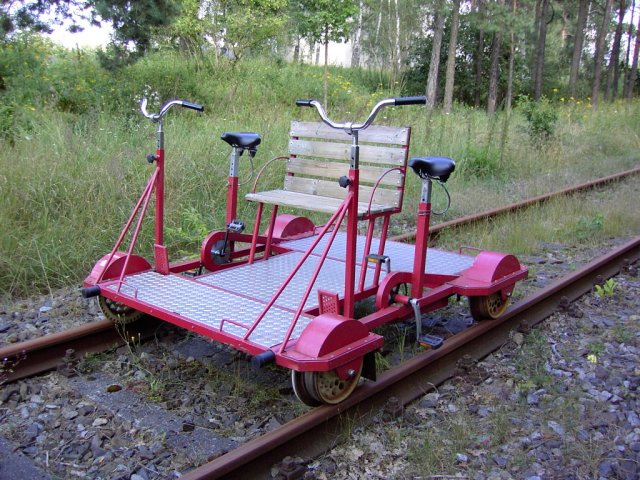
Two-person rail-cycle draisine with four wheels, for leisure

A draisine (English: /dreɪˈziːn/) is a light auxiliary rail vehicle, driven by service personnel, equipped to transport crew and material necessary for the maintenance of railway infrastructure.

The term is derived from the German inventor of a two-wheeled, foot-propelled conveyance Baron Karl Drais, who invented his Laufmaschine (German for "running machine") in 1817, which was called Draisine in German (vélocipède or draisienne in French) by the press.

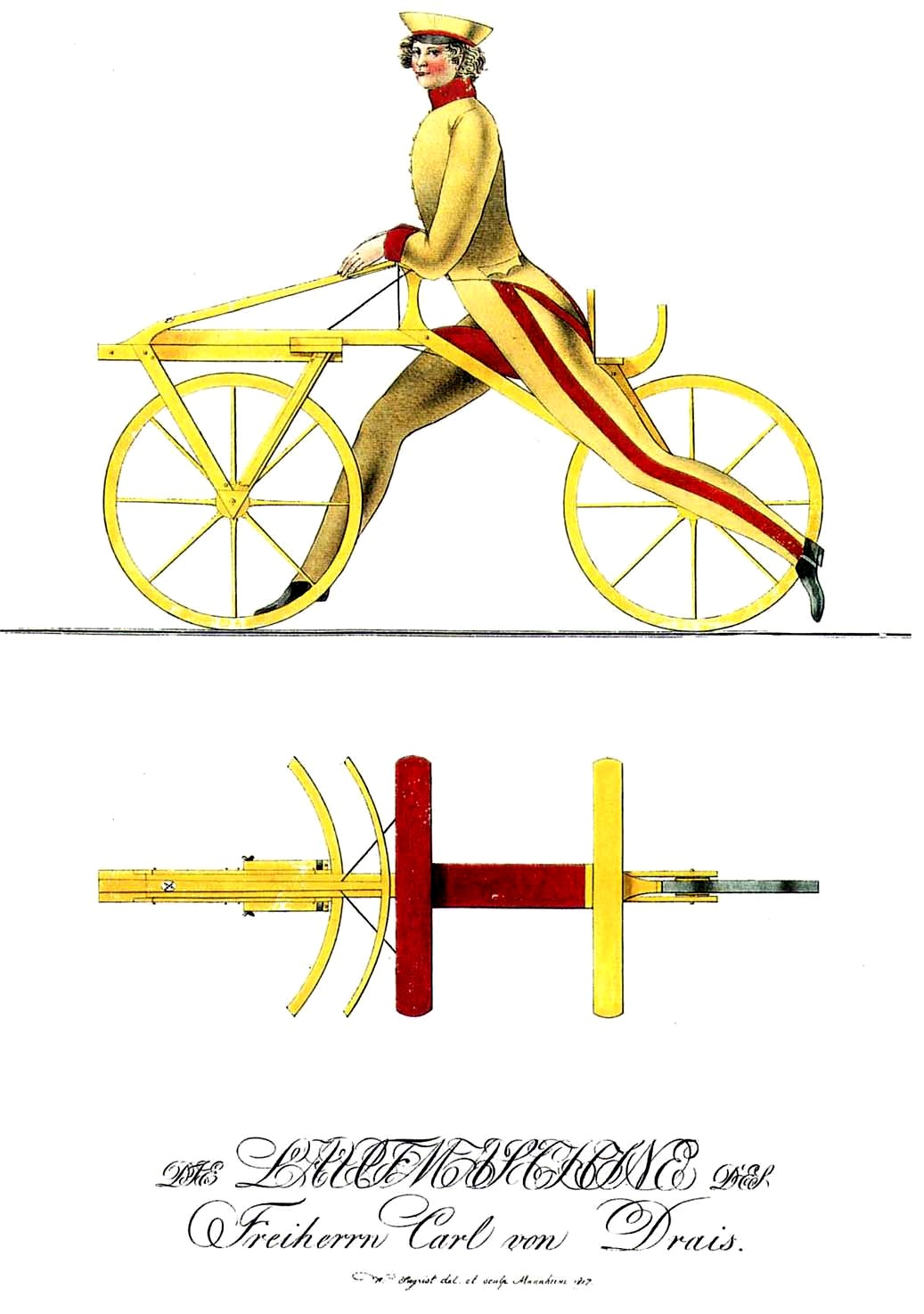
Drais's dandy horse, called Draisine in German, whose name was inherited by the later rail vehicle. (Drawing published in 1817.)

A dandy horse, it is the first reliable claim for a practically used precursor to the bicycle, basically the first commercially successful two-wheeled, steerable, human-propelled machine, also called a hobby-horse.

Later, the name draisine came to be applied only to the invention used on rails and was extended to similar vehicles, even when not human-powered. Because of their low weight and small size, they can be put on and taken off the rails at any place, allowing trains to pass.

In the United States, motor-powered draisines are known as speeders while human-powered ones are referred as handcars. Vehicles that can be driven on both the highway and the rail line are called road–rail vehicles, or (after a trademark) Hy-Rails.

== Types ==
=== Self-propelled ===
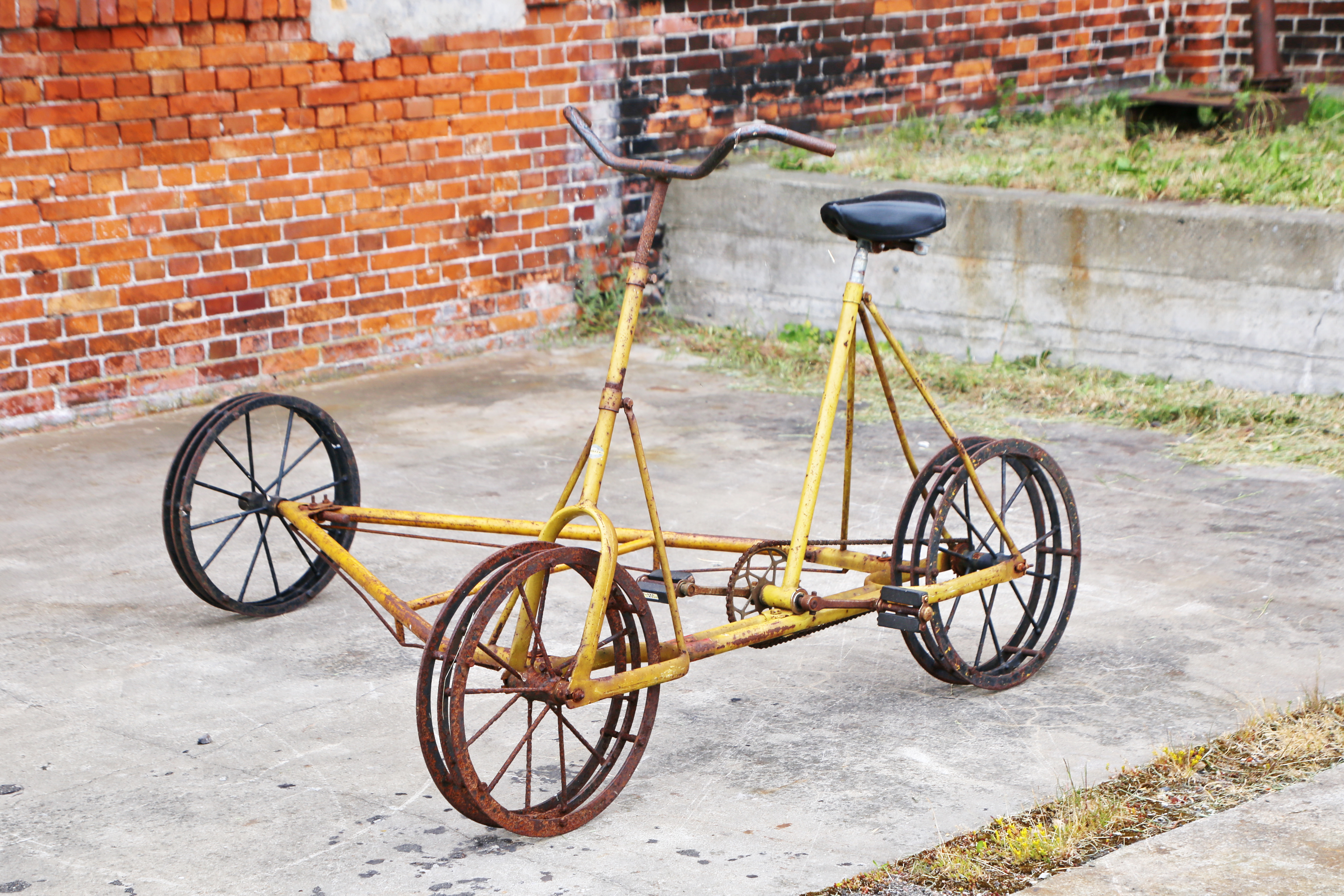
Basic railbike-draisine

There are many forms of self-propelled "draisine”, including the familiar pump-action railroad handcar.

A specific form of pedal-powered rail-cycle used by railroad maintenance workers in Sweden, Norway, Denmark, and Finland until about 1950, are called dressin in Swedish, dresin in Norwegian, dræsine in Danish, and resiina in Finnish.

==== Leisure use and tourism ====
Self-propelled draisines nowadays are used for recreation on several otherwise unused railway lines in Germany, France, Belgium, Austria, Costa Rica, Sweden, Norway, Poland, North America and South Korea. In the United States, railbike tours have operated in several states: California, Maine, Oregon, the Adirondack Mountains of upstate New York, and Delaware.

The form of draisine mostly used by the rental companies uses four medium-sized railway-type steel wheels - however free to rotate individually, with the rear ones driven by bicycle-type pedal arrangements mostly without gearing. These are mounted on moderately heavy steel frames with saddles and/or benches for usually two working riders and several passengers.

For private use the available four-wheel draisines are too heavy. Home builders can use the other basic form, the actual rail bicycle. True rail bicycles balancing on one rail should be possible and have been patented but not it seems demonstrated, except for models using electric gyroscopes or reaction wheels. Therefore the rail cycles in use are actually tricycles consisting of a bicycle on one rail and an outrigger-roller on the other. The lateral stability against tipping to the outside is limited to the weight of the outrigger plus body-lean. The bicycle is guided by a mechanism keeping the front wheel exactly on the rail, sometimes guides are used on the rear wheel as well. Painful derailments can and do occur, especially on abandoned railways with rails in poor condition and/or overgrown tracks. As the tracks can be remote and discontinuous, railbikes must be convertible for use on roads and gravel.

Riding on such disused or seldomly used tracks is an unofficial form of touristic adventure sport especially in the USA, where thousands of miles of abandoned railroad routes still exist. A portal gives information, stories and pictures on this type of railbiking.

===== Safety =====
As the lines are mostly single-track, passing involves one party lifting the draisine entirely off the track in order to let the other one pass. Alternatively no passing is allowed and the groups of tourists use the track in each direction during different time slots. Because of friction and gearing, speeds are limited to around 4 m/s, desirable for safety. At these speeds such constructions do not derail and the vehicles can be ridden closely spaced or connected. Typical operation is shown in a promotional video of a facility on parts of the Belgian Vennbahn.

Because they are not enclosed, draisines often have restraint systems to keep the riders secure in their seats, such as seat belts. Small children must wear 5-point seat belts along with a booster seat. On recreational draisines in the United States, lap belts are required for older riders.

==== Competition and speed records ====
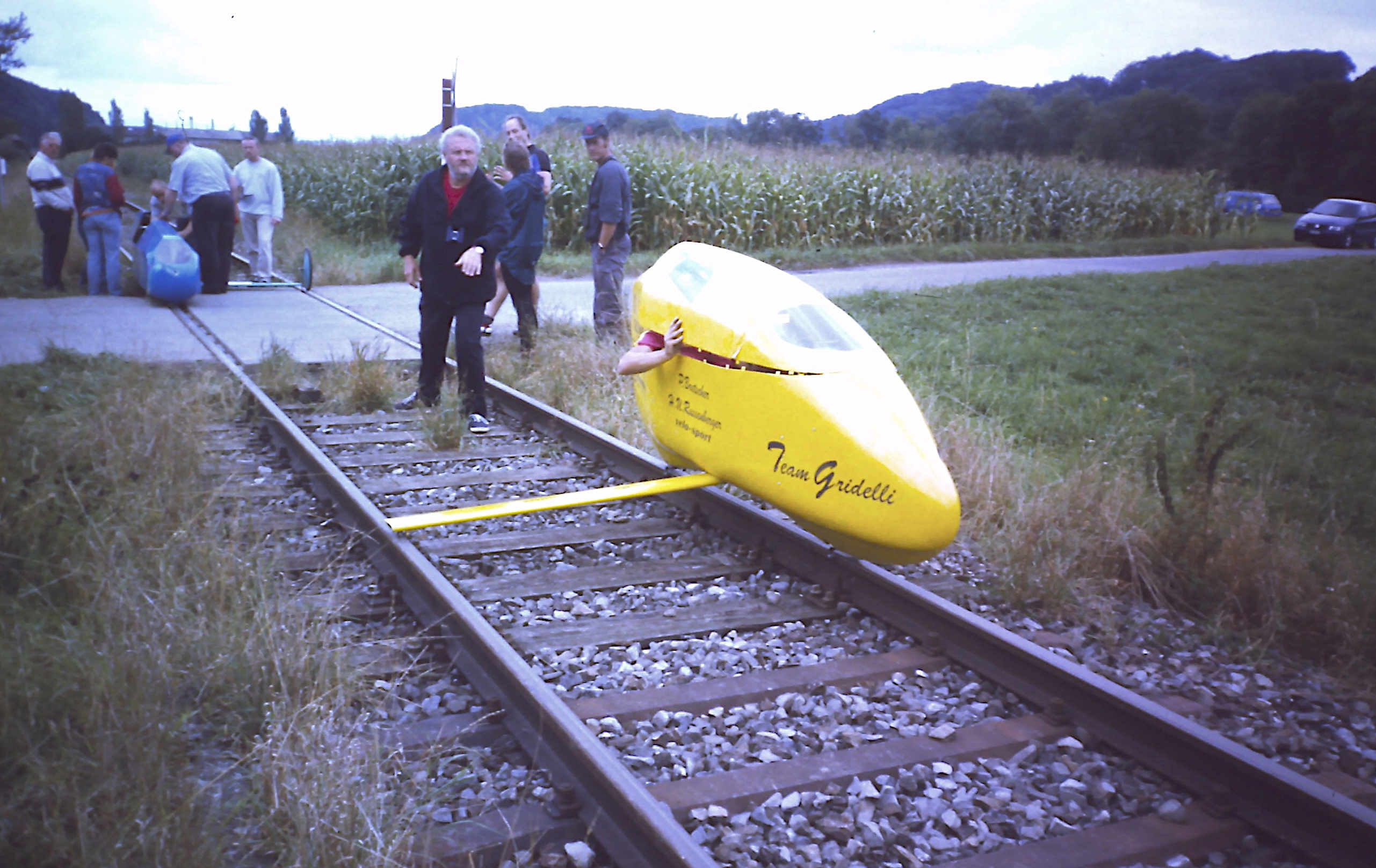
World record holding rail human powered vehicle (HPV) at Laupen 2001

Speed trials for human-powered rail vehicles were held on the railway track between Laupen and Gümmenen in Switzerland in the years 1997, 1998, 1999 and 2001. These were advertised as world championships with the maximum speeds measured over a distance of 200 m (660 ft) as world records. Teams from Switzerland, Germany, France and Great Britain attended. Dick Smart brought his rail cycle from the USA in 1998 but did not race it, also Bernard and Françoise Magnoulouxtheir tandem railbike. The entries ranged from a rail-kickboard (18.5 km/h (11.5 mph)), a historic draisine from 1916 and a modern commercial draisine Valendaire (approximately 20 km/h (12 mph), to specially built recumbent racing vehicles partially with aerodynamic fairings. Their speeds with fit non-athletes ranged from about 39 km/h (24 mph) (recumbent unfaired), 48 km/h (30 mph) (partially faired), 60–70 km/h (37–43 mph) (fully faired), to 74.5 km/h (46.3 mph) with athlete Hansueli Russenberger on Gridelli vehicle in 2001, the world record. The track was in good condition, straight and almost level, with a maximum run-up of 1.5 km (0.93 mi).

Until 2007, Finland hosted an annual competition, Resiina-ralli (Draisine Rally), involving several draisine teams travelling for many days on the railways from one corner of the country to another.

==== Construction ====
Factory-built models have been available, beginning with a device marketed in 1908 through the Sears catalogue for just US$5.45 (equivalent to $195 in 2025).

There are many designs of draisine. However, certain fundamentals of railbike design must be adhered to, foremost among them the reconciliation of a bicycle's stability with adaptation to riding on a railway track. Simply adding flanged wheels to a conventional bicycle would make it impossible to balance, so the typical approach to stabilization is to add an outrigger, with roller(s), across to the second rail from near the bicycle's rear wheel.

Practicality also commonly demands that the bicycle continue to be able to be ridden off rails, for the rider to travel to the tracks.

=== Motorized ===
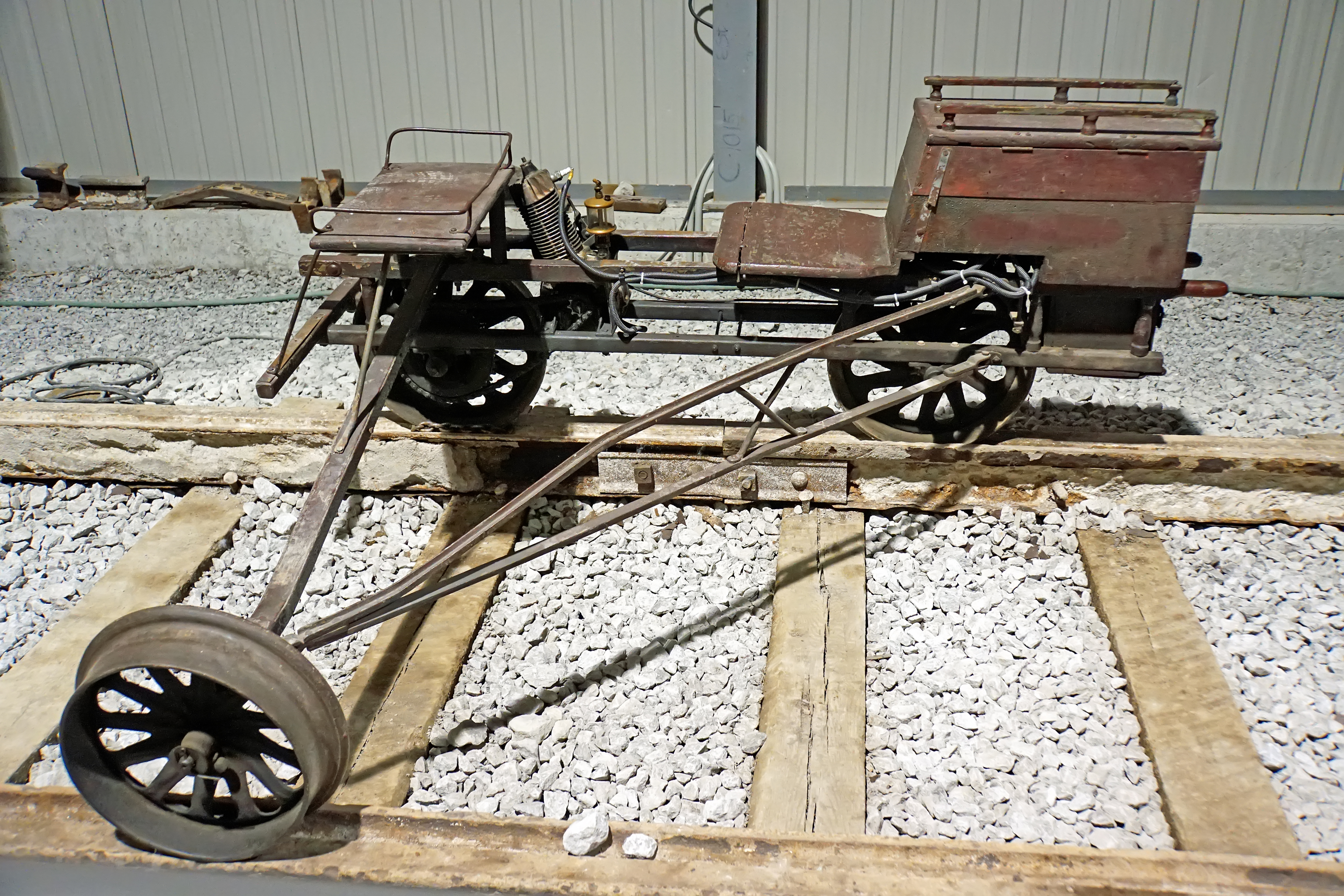
Motorized Draisine

==== Railroad ====
The first motorized draisines appeared on the railroads, serving as inspection cars and transport for minor repairs.

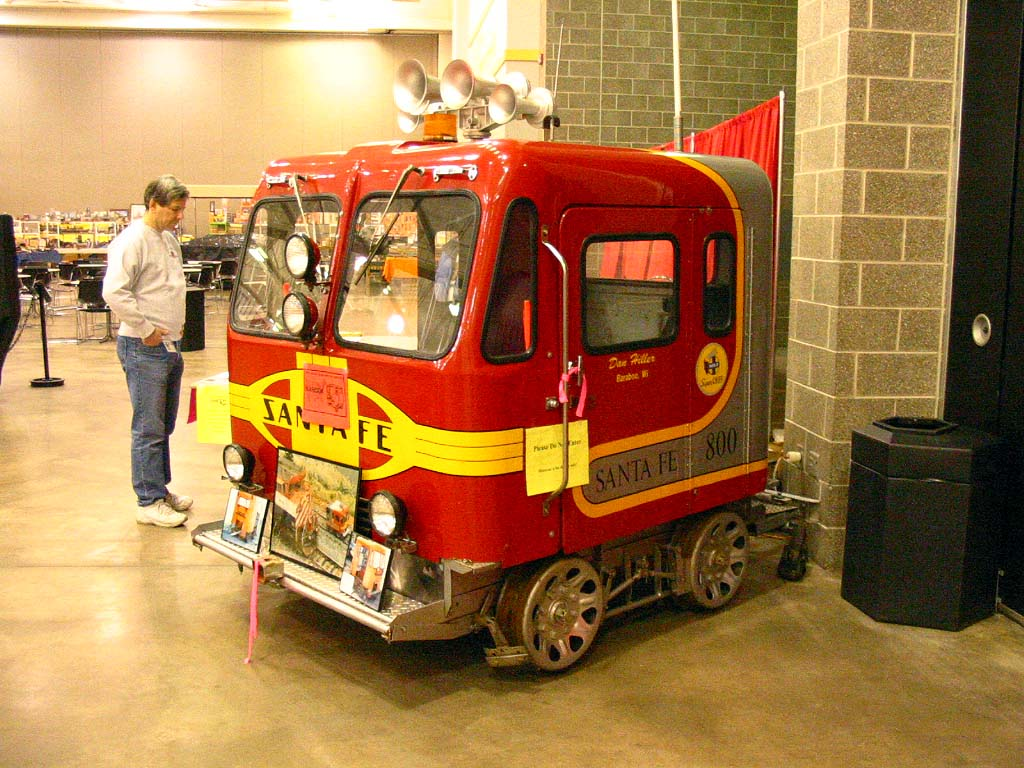
A former Santa Fe Railroad Fairmont MT-14 self-propelled inspection car on display in 2004

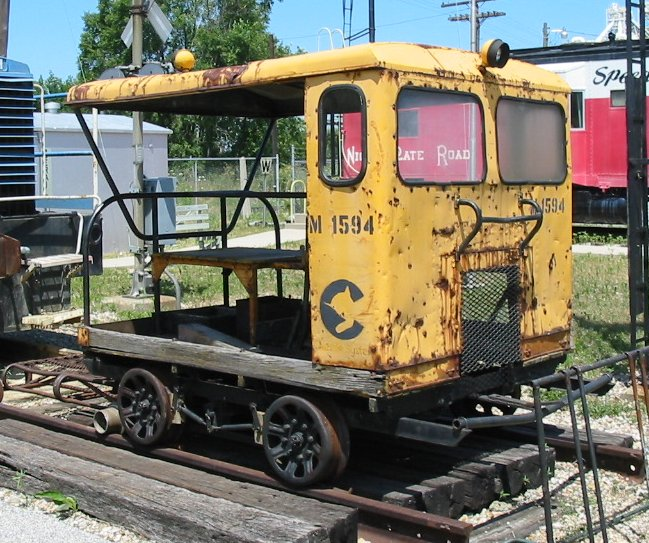
A former Chessie System speeder at the Linden Railroad Museum, Linden, Indiana

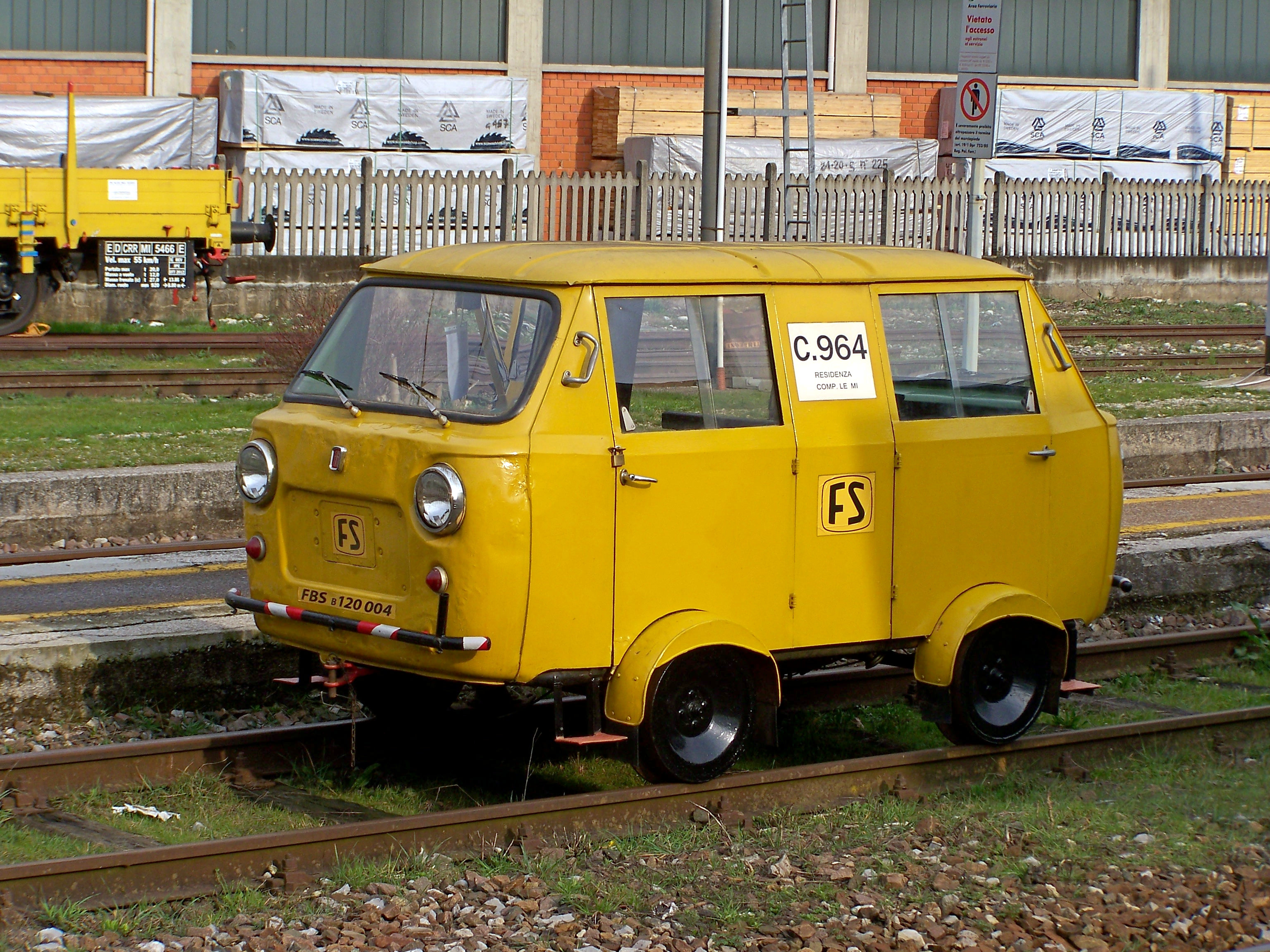
Italian FS state railways draisine with Fiat 500 Giardiniera engine and Fiat 850 T front panels

==== Automotive ====
Many automobiles have been converted to draisine use.

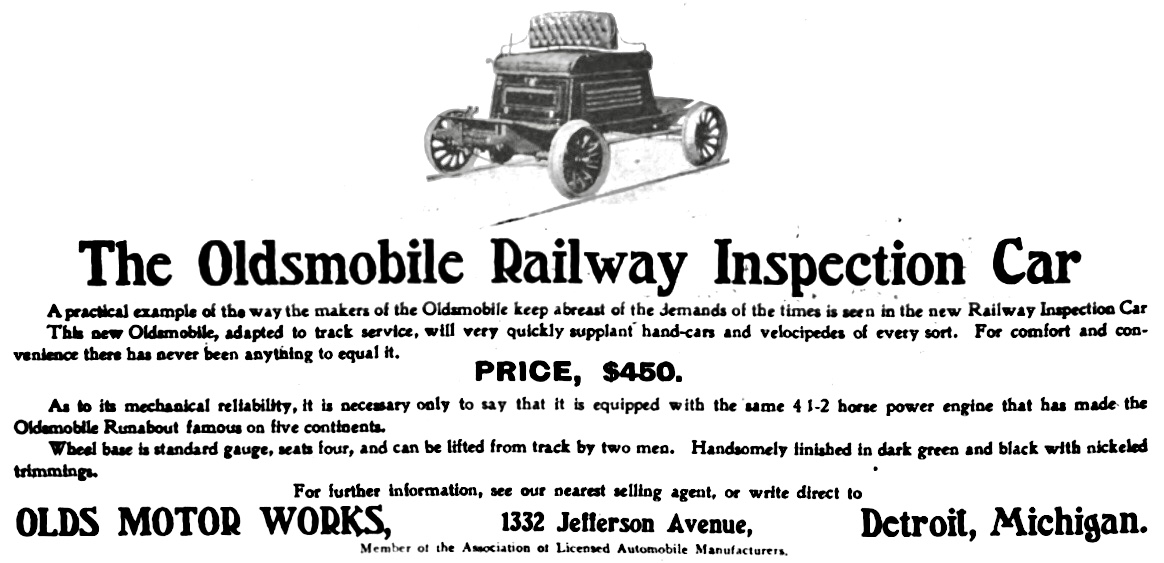
Oldsmobile railway inspection car (1904)

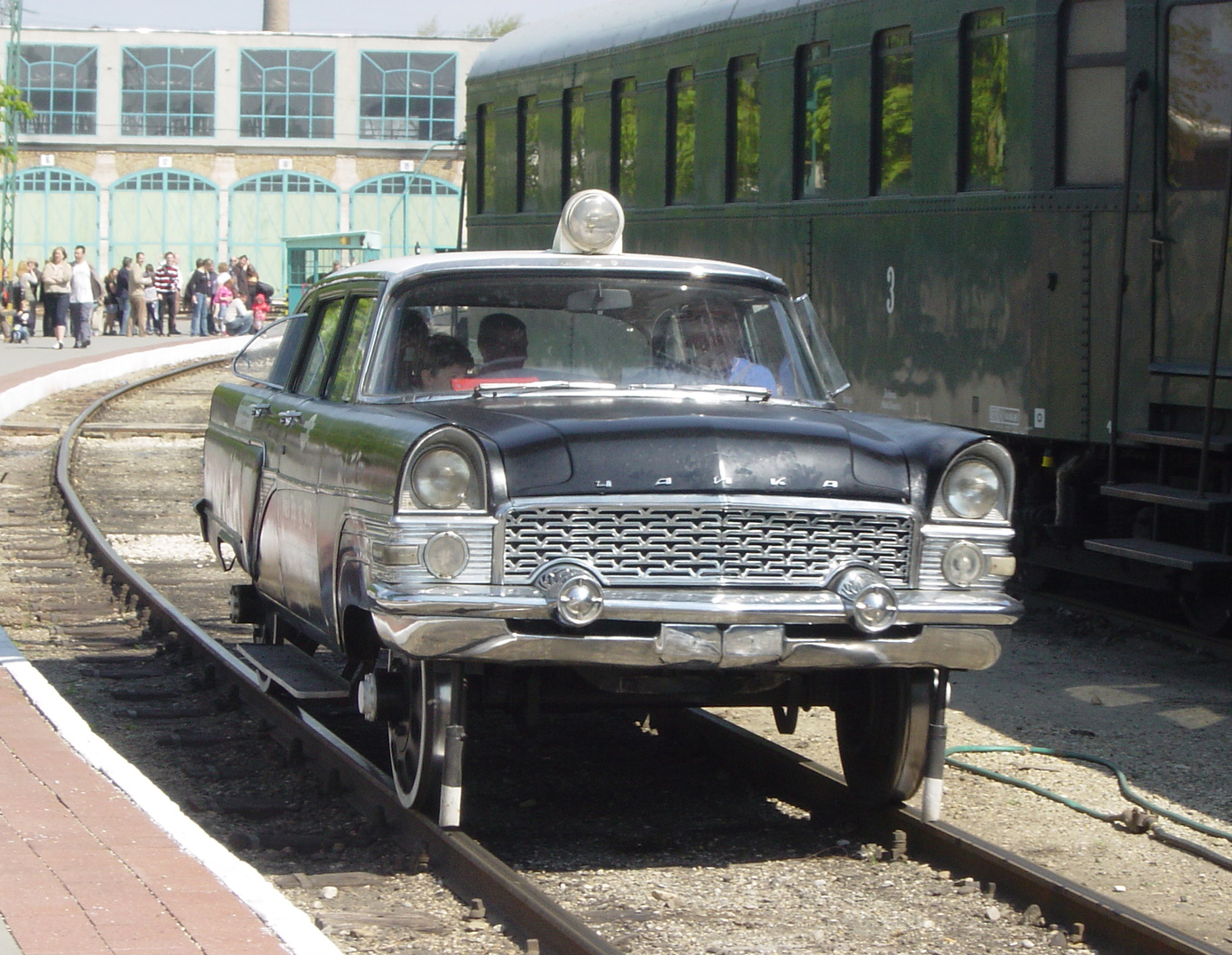
Car (Russian GAZ-13 Chaika) converted into a railroad speeder, at the Hungarian Railway Museum

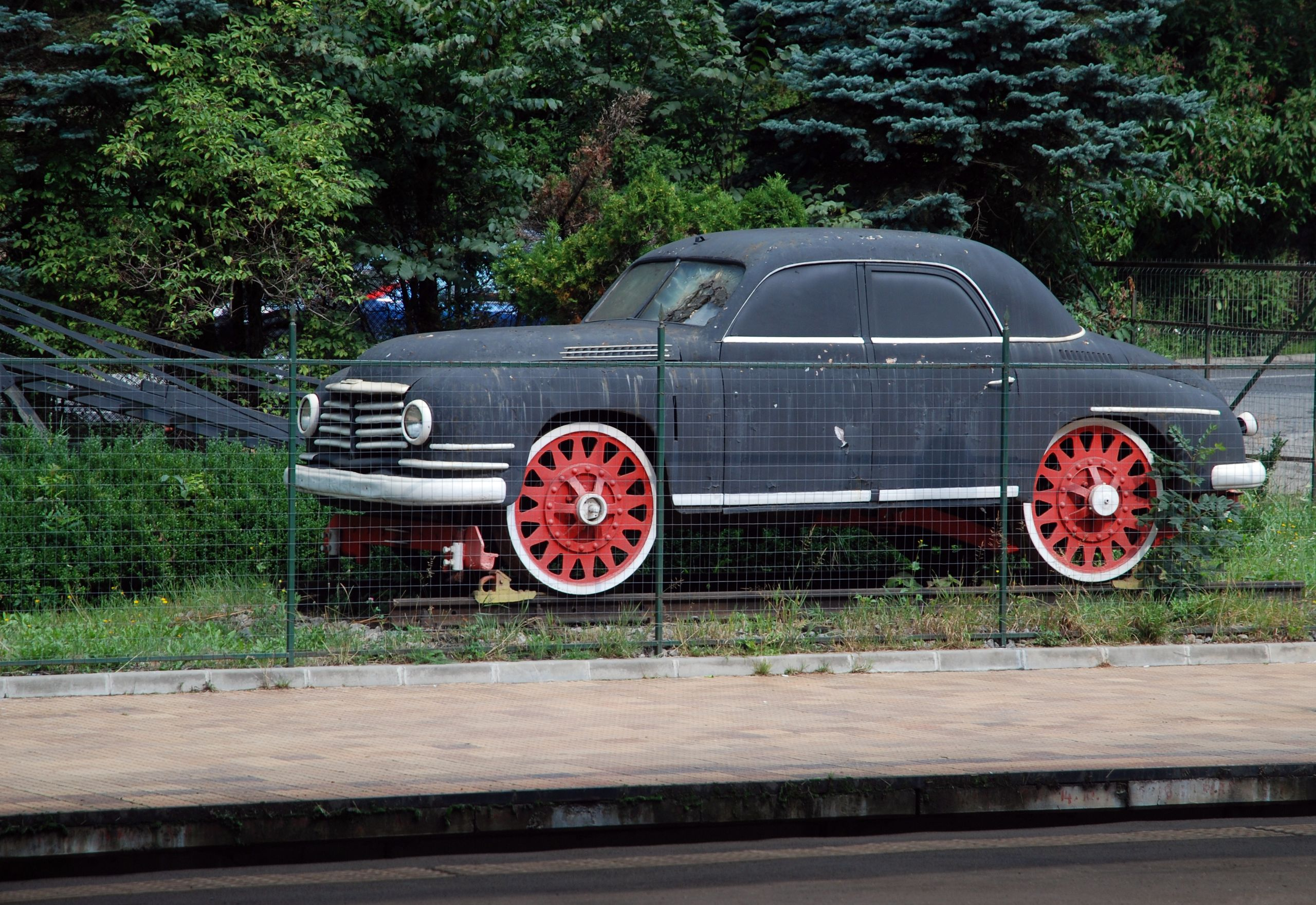
Ana Pauker's Škoda VOS up for display in the train Station of Sinaia

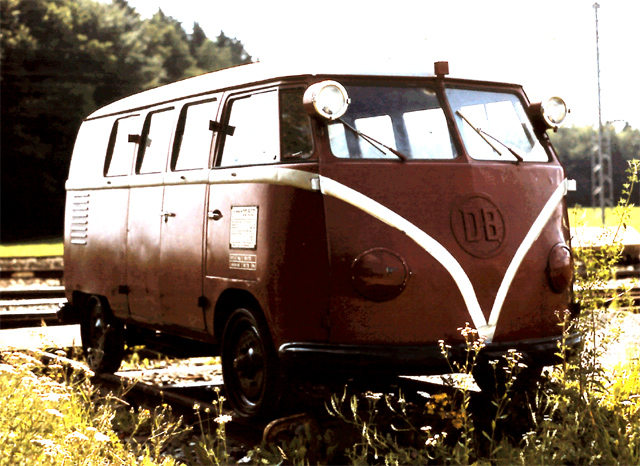
Deutsche Bundesbahn railroad speeder based on the Volkswagen Type 2

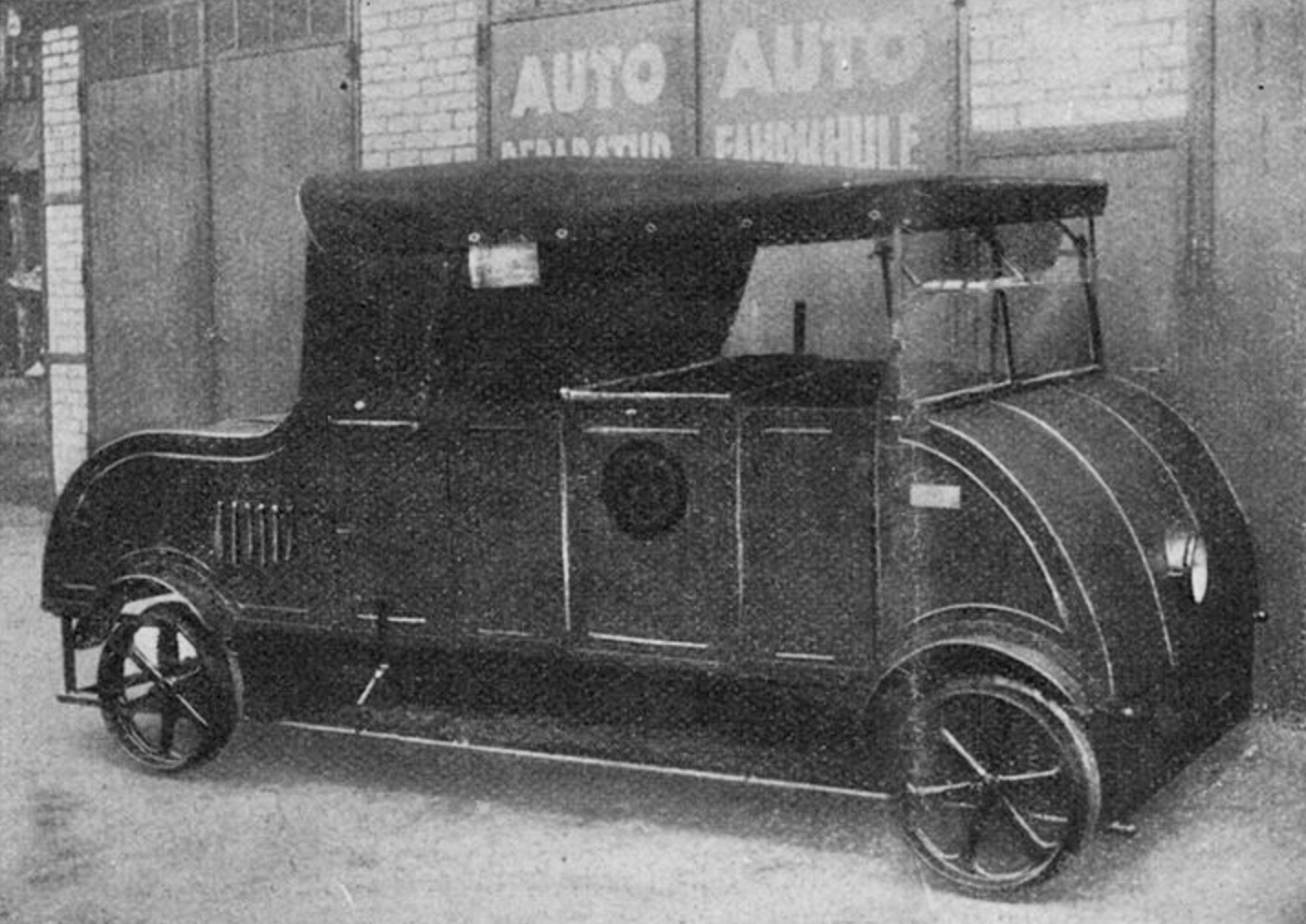
Hanomag 2/10 PS Draisine; Deutsche Reichsbahn AG

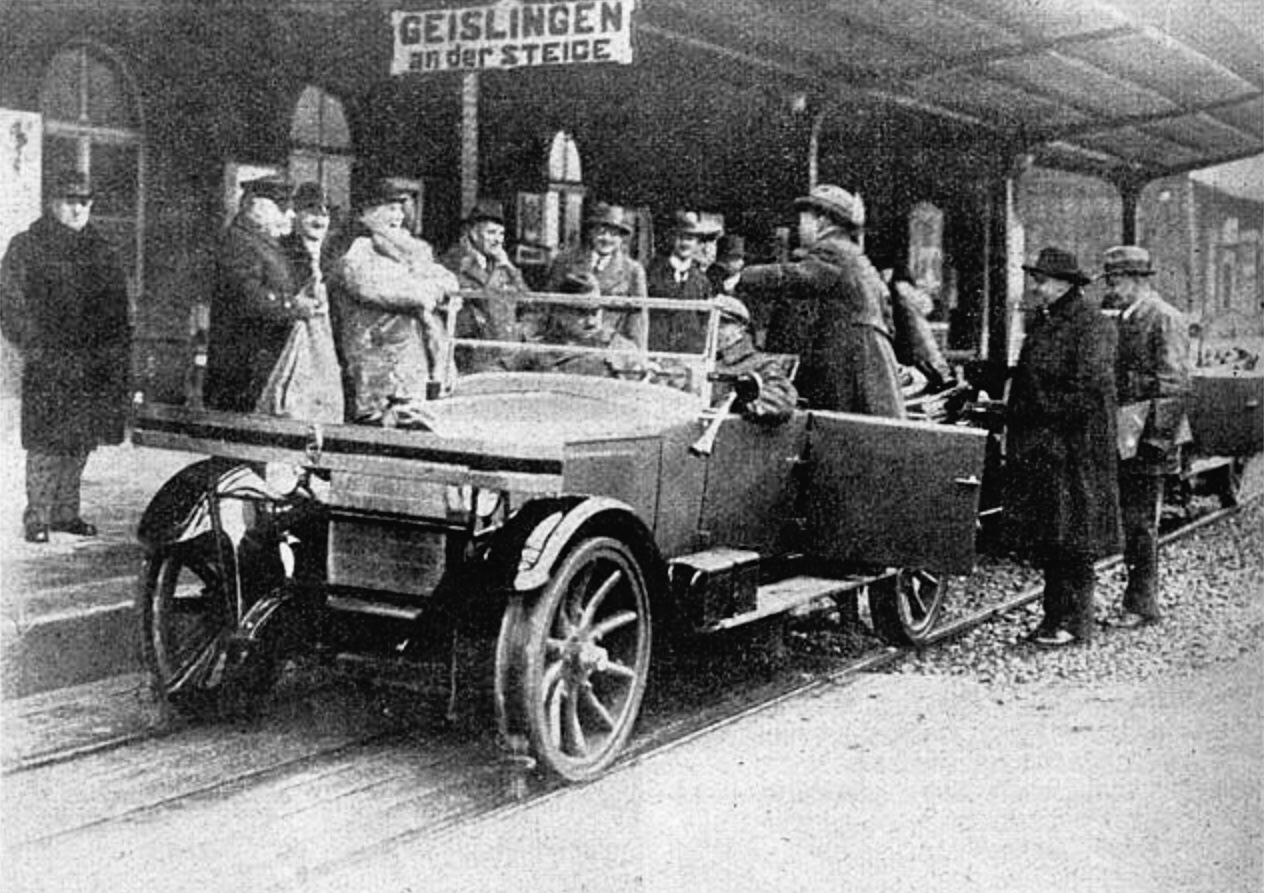
Mercedes Draisine 8-38 (1926-1929); Deutsche Reichsbahn AG

==== Military ====
Draisines have filled various roles in militaries around the globe, including reconnaissance, security, track patrol, and various utility functions.

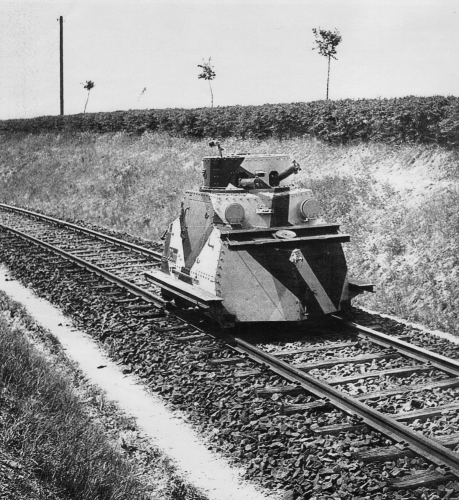
Armoured draisine Tatra T18 built in Czechoslovakia for Polish armed forces (1930s)

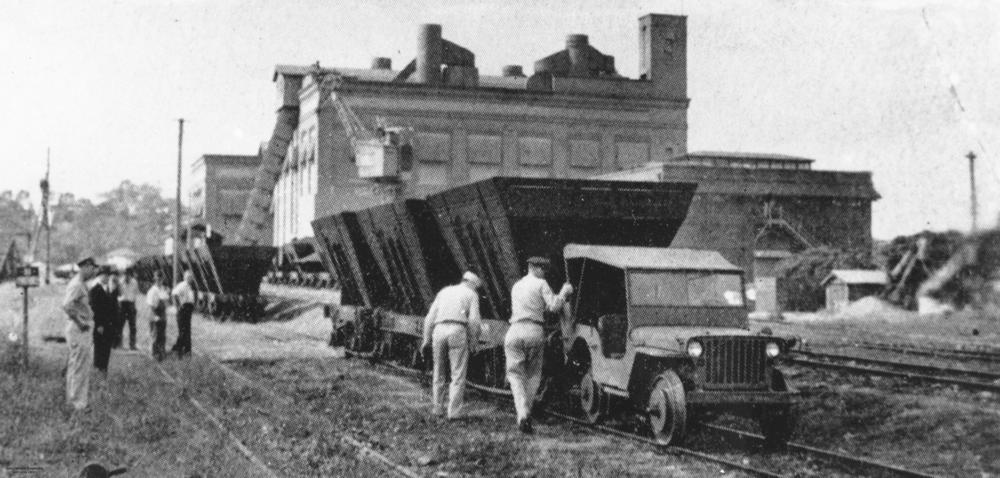
Jeep shunting empty coal hoppers, World War II

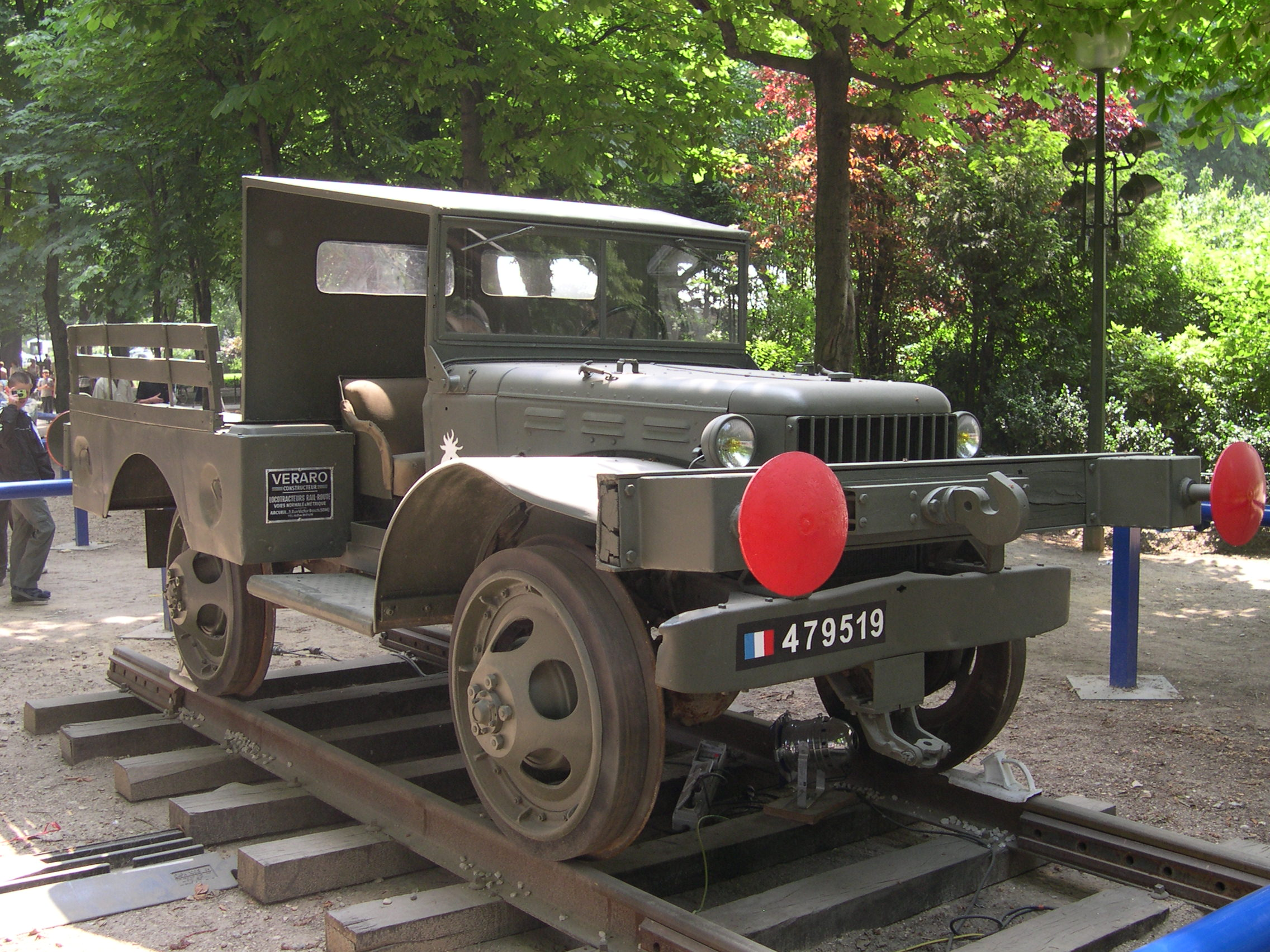
Dodge WC used for WWII utility draisine duty

Armoured draisines were light rail motor vehicles, intended for reconnaissance, track patrolling, and other auxiliary combat tasks, usually belonging to armoured trains. Early vehicles of this kind were built in Russia during World War I. Later, often armoured cars were used as armoured draisines, after changing their wheels to railroad ones, or fitting them with additional retractable railroad rollers. Some countries, such as the USSR and Czechoslovakia, however, manufactured purpose-built armoured draisines between the wars. Polish armoured draisines were tanks or tankettes fitted with special chassis, able to be used on rails or land.

Different armoured draisines were used during the Second World War, starting from the invasion of Poland by Nazi Germany.

Prior to World War II, the Japanese Empire had already made extensive use of draisines such as the Sumida M.2593 in the Japanese invasion of Manchuria and the Sino-Japanese War. From 1952, the Wikham Armoured Trolley was used by British security forces during the Malayan Emergency.

== Gallery ==
=== Self-propelled ===
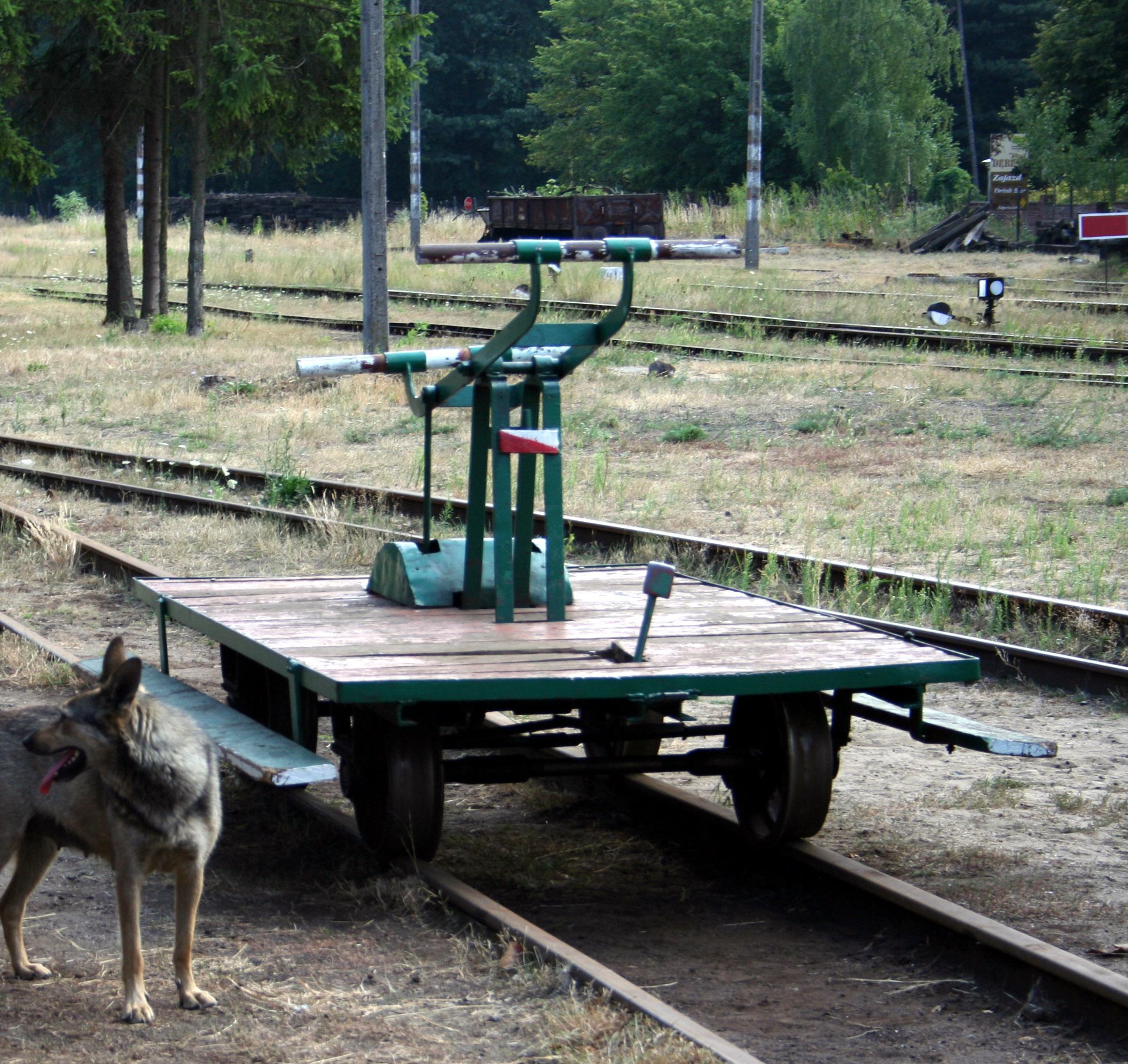
Hand-lever draisine handcar

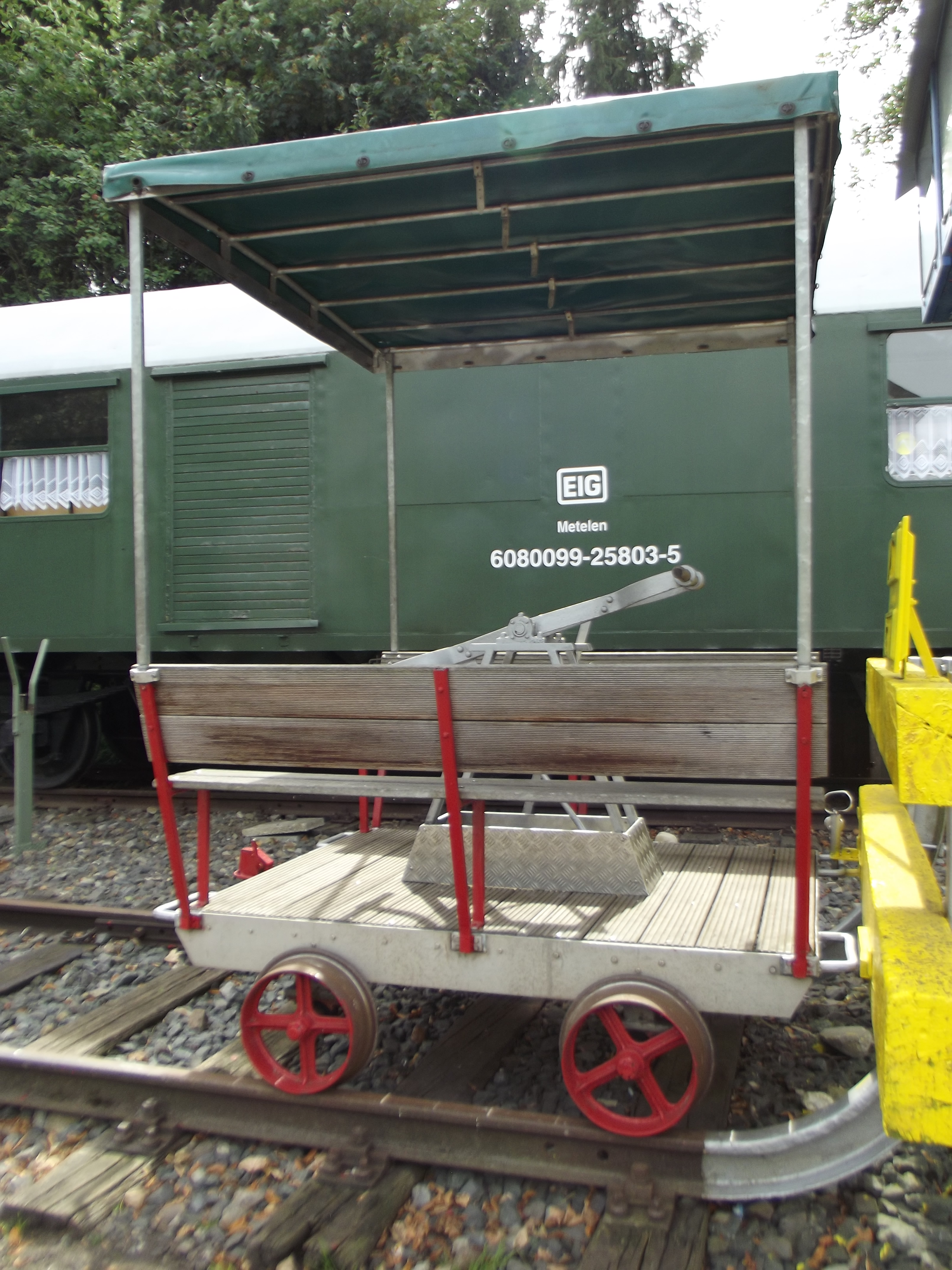
Functioning draisine

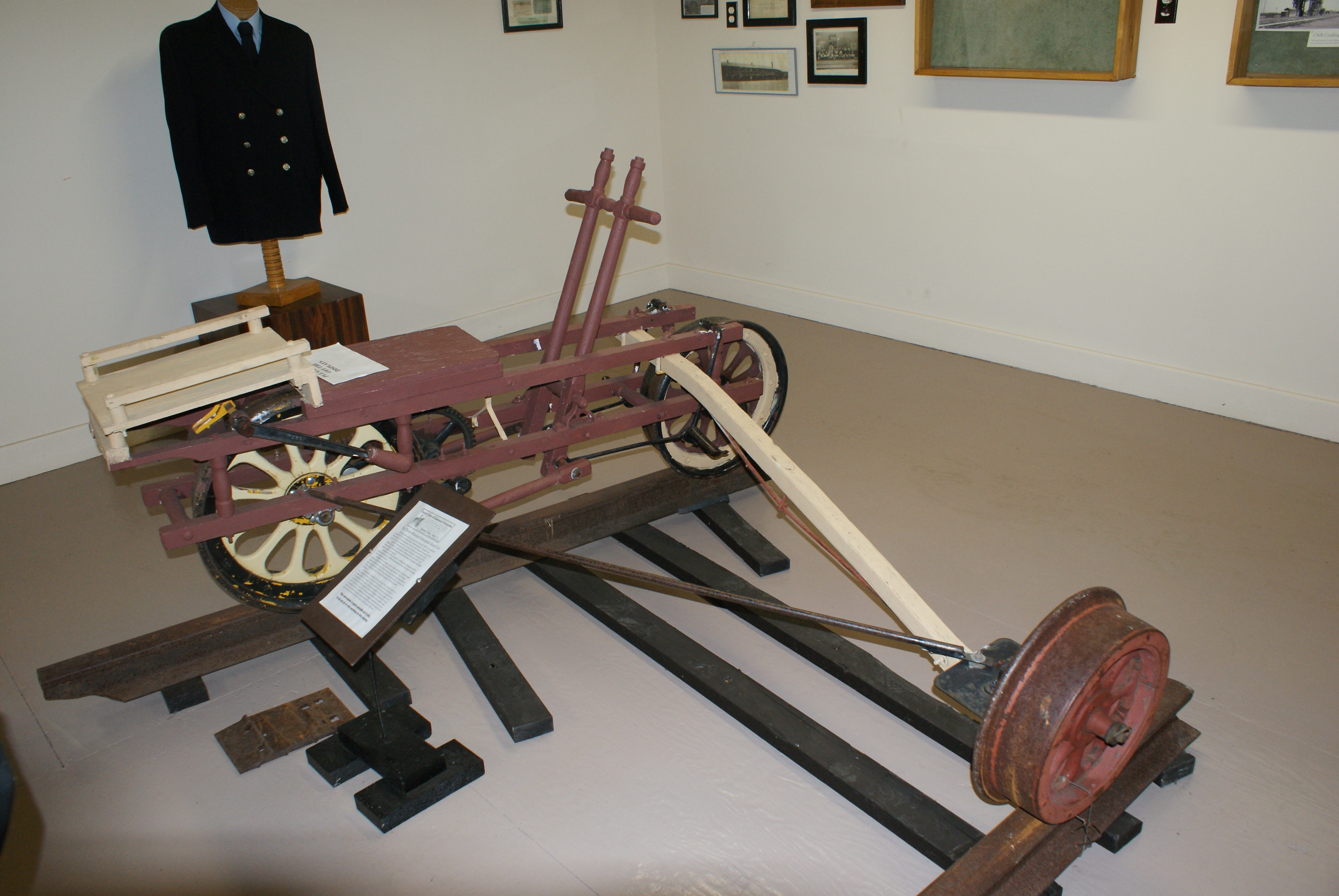
Three-wheeled draisine at the Saskatchewan Railway Museum exhibited by a railway history museum in Metelen, Germany

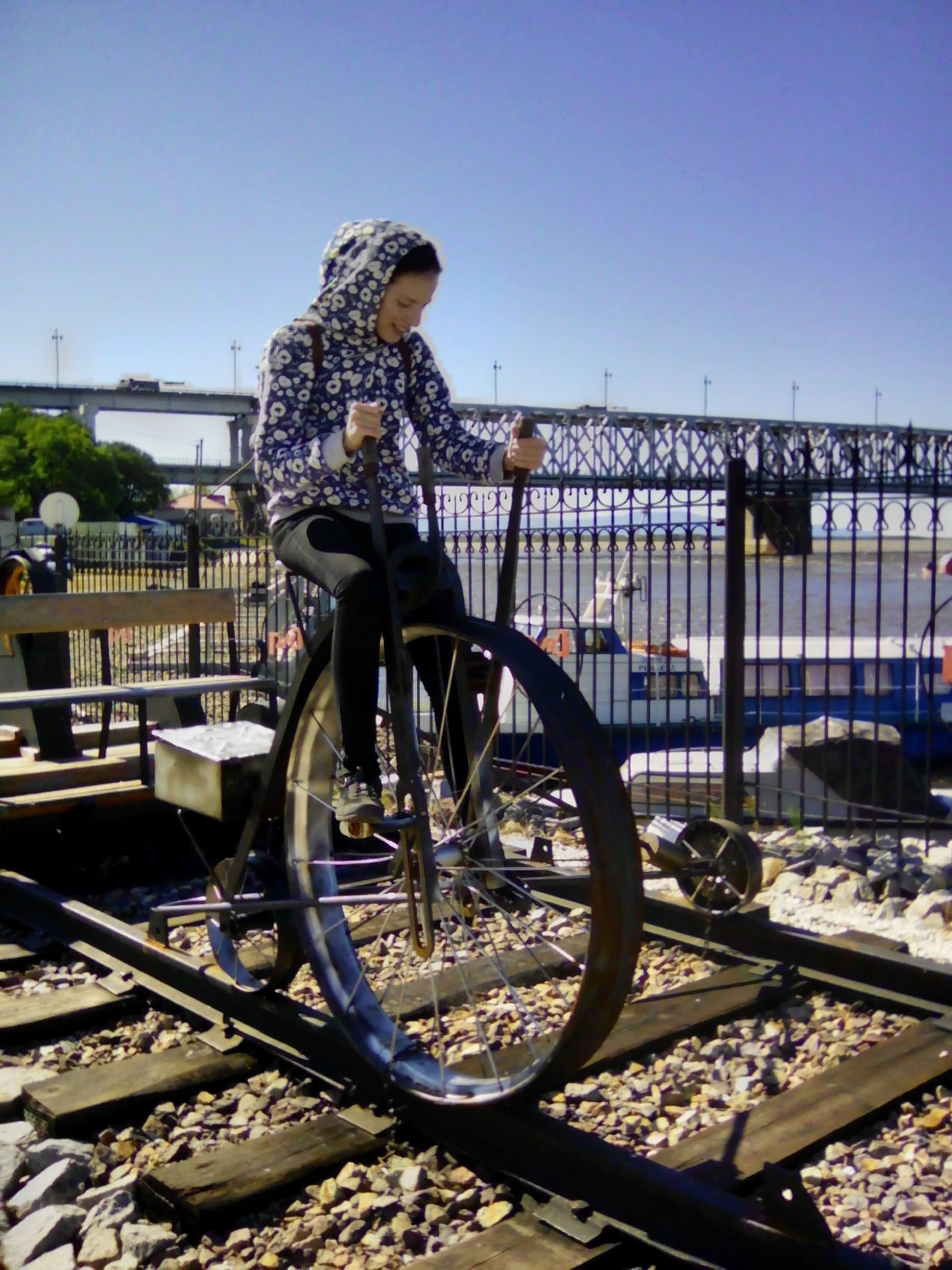
Combined pedal- and hand-driven railway bike in the museum of Khabarovsk Bridge, Russia

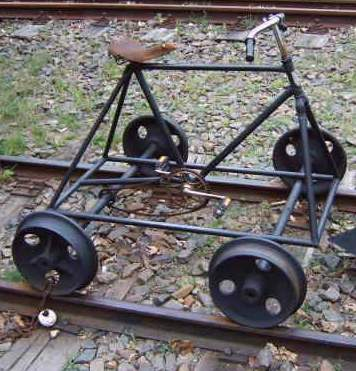
Pedaled four-wheel rail-cycle draisine

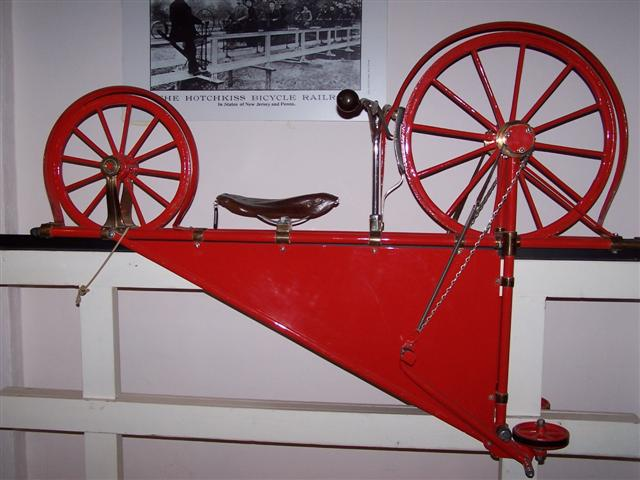
Purpose-built bicycle for riding the Hotchkiss Bicycle Railroad

=== Motorized ===
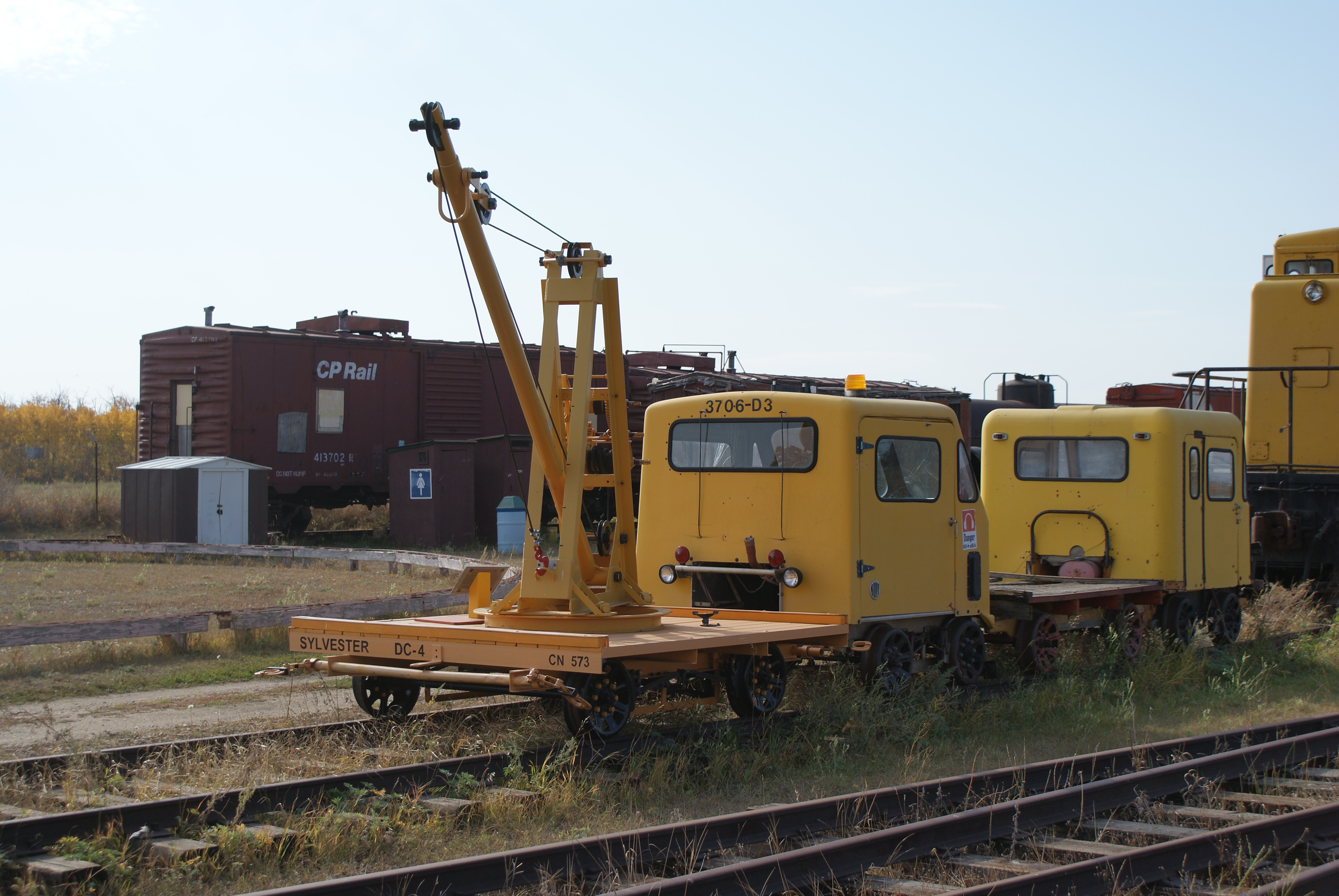
Motorized draisines are known as speeders, trolleys, or “jiggers” in the United States and Canada.

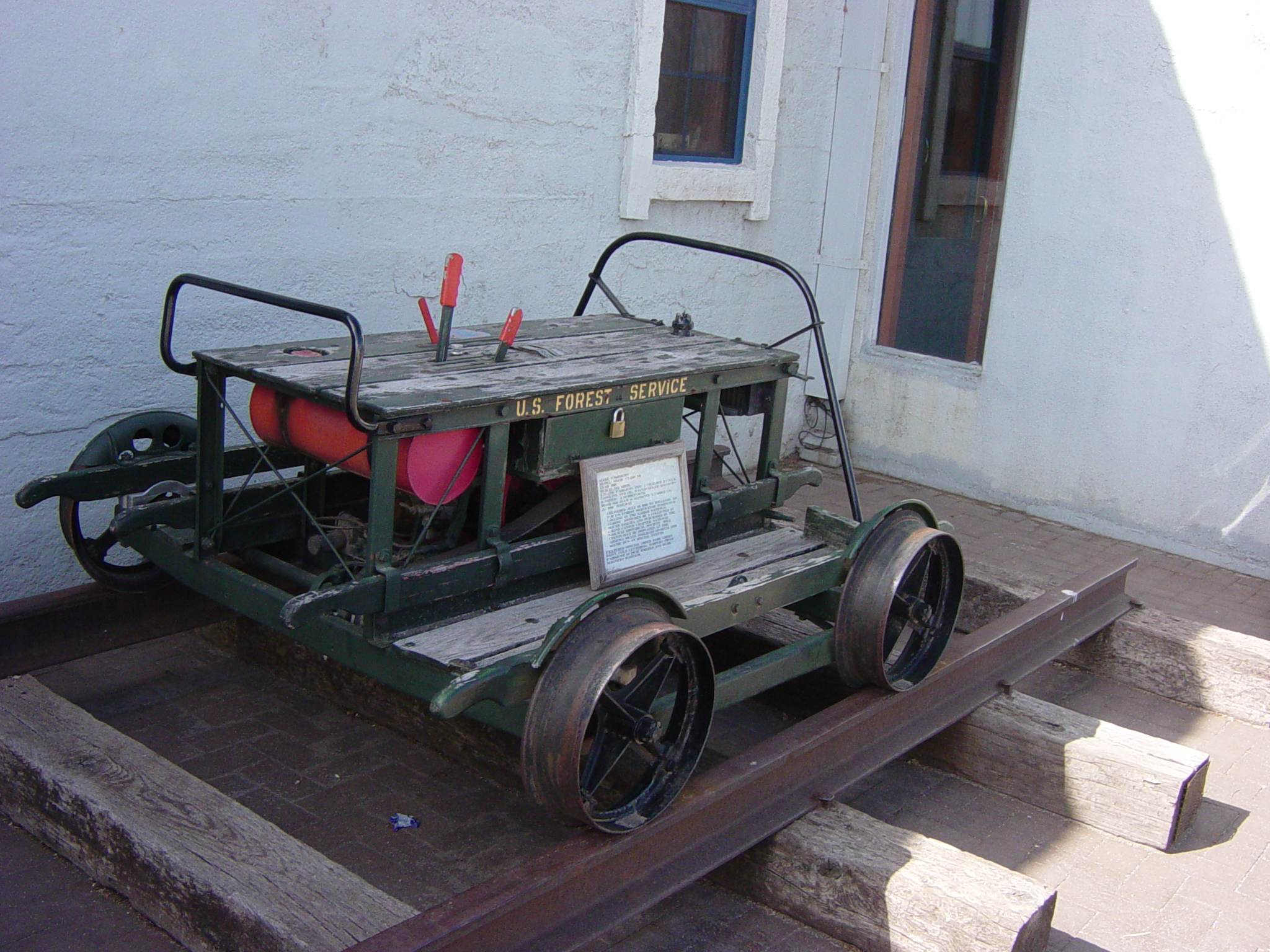
Compact motorized United States Forest Service railcar

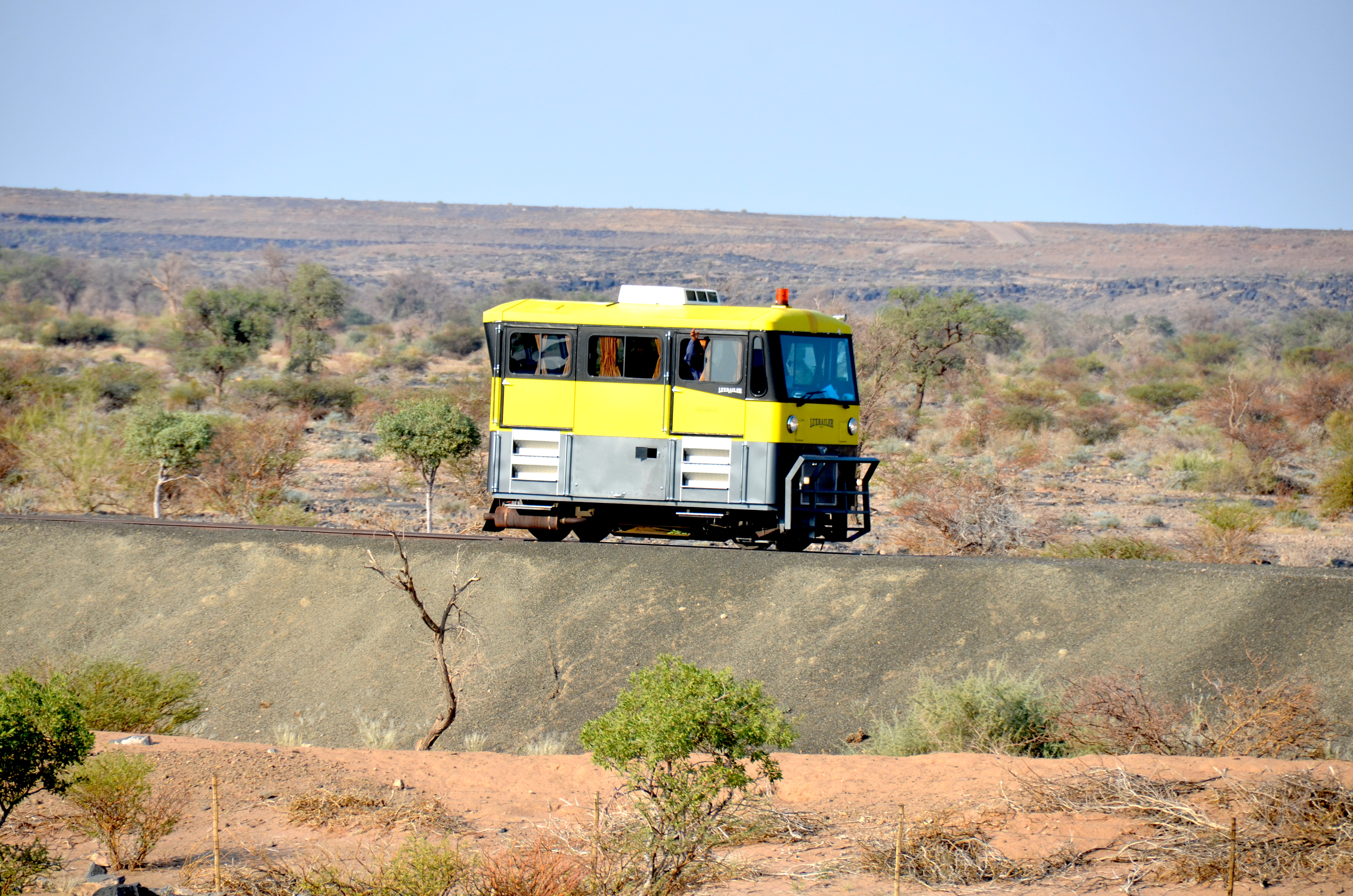
Draisine for crew transport and railway track inspection in Namibia 2017

== See also ==
- Balance bicycle
- Handcar
- History of the bicycle
- Human-powered land vehicle
- Norry
- Railbus
- Railroad speeder
- Railway Mokes
- Sail bogey
- Taiwanese push car railways
