= Select Medical =

American healthcare company

- Type: Private
- Traded as: NYSE: SEM
- Industry: Healthcare
- Founded: 1996
- Headquarters: Mechanicsburg, Pennsylvania, United States
- Key people: Robert Ortenzio (Chairman); David Chernow (President & CEO)
- Products: Specialty healthcare services
- Revenue: ▲$5.2 billion USD (2018)
- Number of employees: 47,596 (2017)
- Website: selectmedical.com

Select Medical is a healthcare company based in Pennsylvania. It owns long-term acute care and inpatient rehabilitation hospitals, as well as occupational health and physical therapy clinics.

== History ==
The company is based in Mechanicsburg, Pennsylvania, and was co-founded in 1996 by Rocco Ortenzio and Robert Ortenzio.

In 2009, the company announced a joint venture with SSM Health Care.

In December 2012, the company announced a partnership with Emory Healthcare.

In 2013, David Chernow was appointed CEO while co-founders Robert and Rocco Ortenzio became chairmen of the company. In June, Select Medical acquired two inpatient rehabilitation facilities from GlobalRehab Management. Also in 2013, Select Medical and OhioHealth Corp announced a joint venture and reopened the OhioHealth Rehabilitation Hospital in August 2013. In December, the company announced a partnership with Cedars-Sinai and UCLA Health System to create the California Rehabilitation Institute.

In March 2014, the company announced a joint venture with TriHealth to open the TriHealth Rehabilitation Hospital in Cincinnati. In June, the company announced a joint venture with the Cleveland Clinic to operate a rehabilitation hospital in Avon, Ohio. Also in June, the company announced a joint venture with PinnacleHealth System to co-own a rehabilitation hospital.

In 2015, Select Medical completed its acquisition of Concentra, a national health care company. Also in 2015, the company announced a partnership with Ochsner Health System.

In February 2016, the company announced an agreement to swap hospitals with Kindred Healthcare. In March, the company acquired Physiotherapy Associates Holdings. In April, the company sold its Contract Therapy business to Encore Rehabilitation Services, a portfolio company of Revelstoke Capital Partners LLC.

In July 2026, the company was acquired by a consortium led by Robert A. Ortenzio, Executive Chairman, Co-Founder and Director of Select Medical, Martin F. Jackson, Senior Executive Vice President of Strategic Finance and Operations of Select Medical, and Welsh, Carson, Anderson & Stowe.
