= Addus HomeCare =

American home-care services company

Addus HomeCare Corporation
- Formerly: Addus Holding Corporation (2006–2009)
- Type: Public
- Traded as: Nasdaq: ADUS; S&P 600 component
- Industry: Home care
- Founded: 1979; 47 years ago
- Headquarters: Frisco, Texas, United States
- Area served: United States
- Key people: R. Dirk Allison (chairman and CEO)
- Services: Personal care, home health care and hospice care
- Revenue: US$1.4225 billion (2025)
- Net income: US$95.91 million (2025)
- Total assets: US$1.4373 billion (2025)
- Number of employees: 50,659 (2025)
- Website: addus.com

Addus HomeCare is an American provider of personal-care, home-health and hospice services. In 2024, D Magazine described Addus as the largest publicly traded provider of home-care services in the United States.

Founded in 1979, Addus focused on non-medical personal care and later expanded into home-health and hospice services through acquisitions. The present parent company completed an initial public offering in 2009. In 2024, it acquired the personal-care operations of Gentiva for approximately $350 million, entering Texas and Missouri and expanding its operations in five other states.

Its 2025 annual report states that Addus operated approximately 262 offices in 23 states and served approximately 107,000 individual consumers during the year. As of 2026, the company is headquartered in Frisco, Texas, and trades on the Nasdaq under the symbol ADUS.

== History ==
Addus HealthCare was founded in 1979. Addus HomeCare Corporation was formed in 2006 under the name Addus Holding Corporation by investment funds affiliated with Eos Management. In September 2006, the holding company acquired Addus HealthCare. It changed its name to Addus HomeCare Corporation in July 2009.

In October 2009, Addus priced its initial public offering at $10 per share, offering 5.4 million shares. Its common stock was approved for listing on the Nasdaq Global Market under the symbol ADUS.

R. Dirk Allison joined the company's board in 2010, became chief executive officer in 2016 and chairman in 2021. In 2017, Addus moved its headquarters from Illinois to Frisco, Texas. The relocation followed changes in senior management and operational difficulties associated with the Illinois state budget crisis.

Addus was added to the S&P SmallCap 600 in December 2018.

== Operations ==
Addus operates through three reporting segments: personal care, hospice and home health. Its services are primarily provided under agreements with federal, state and local government agencies, managed-care organizations, commercial insurers and private individuals.

The personal-care segment provides non-medical assistance with activities such as bathing, dressing, grooming, meal preparation, housekeeping, medication reminders and transportation. It also supplies personnel to some assisted-living facilities, nursing homes and hospice providers. Personal care is the company's largest segment; in 2025, it generated approximately $1.09 billion of Addus's total $1.42 billion in net service revenue.

The hospice segment provides nursing care, social work, spiritual counseling, homemaker services and bereavement support for terminally ill patients and their families. The home-health segment provides skilled nursing and physical, occupational and speech therapy, generally for patients recovering from an illness, injury or hospitalization.

In 2025, Addus reported net income of $95.9 million and total assets of approximately $1.44 billion. It employed 50,659 people, including 49,948 caregivers and agency staff. Approximately 17,500 employees were represented by labor unions, including affiliates of the Service Employees International Union.

== Expansion and divestiture ==
=== Selected acquisitions ===
In 2018, Addus acquired Ambercare Corporation, a New Mexico provider of personal-care, home-health and hospice services, for approximately $40 million. The acquisition made New Mexico the first state in which Addus operated all three of its principal service lines.

In October 2019, Addus acquired Hospice Partners of America for $130 million. Hospice Partners operated 21 locations in six states and served approximately 1,000 patients per day. The acquisition was part of Addus's strategy of adding hospice operations in markets where it already provided personal-care services.

In November 2020, Addus agreed to acquire Queen City Hospice and its affiliate Miracle City Hospice for $192 million. Queen City served nearly 900 patients per day in the Cincinnati, Columbus and Dayton areas. The acquisition expanded Addus's hospice operations in Ohio, which became the second state in which the company operated all three of its principal service lines.

In December 2024, Addus completed its acquisition of Gentiva's personal-care operations. The acquired business served more than 16,000 patients per day across Arizona, Arkansas, California, Missouri, North Carolina, Tennessee and Texas. The transaction expanded Addus's personal-care operations in Arizona, Arkansas, California and North Carolina; expanded its home-health operations in Tennessee; and brought the company into the Missouri and Texas markets.

=== Withdrawal from New York ===
In May 2024, Addus agreed to sell its New York personal-care operations to HCS-Girling for up to $23 million and exit the state. The operations included fiscal-intermediary services under New York's Consumer Directed Personal Assistance Program.

The company attributed that decision to regulatory uncertainty surrounding the consumer-directed program, reimbursement and wage issues, and its inability to offer all three of its principal service lines in New York. By October 2024, more than half of the operation's clients and caregivers had been transferred to HCS-Girling, and Addus had relinquished control of operations. The company subsequently ceased operating in New York.

== Regulatory and legal matters ==
In April 2023, the Centers for Medicare & Medicaid Services (CMS) proposed requiring home-care providers to spend at least 80 percent of certain Medicaid payments on wages, benefits and other compensation for direct-care workers. Home-care companies said the requirement could make some Medicaid-funded services financially unsustainable, while workers and consumer advocates argued that it would improve pay, reduce staff turnover and provide more consistent care.

Addus was identified as one of the companies particularly affected by the proposed rule and reported that its share price fell approximately 28 percent. CMS finalized the payment-adequacy provision in April 2024, generally requiring implementation within six years and allowing specified exceptions and flexibility for states and smaller providers.

In 2019, Addus agreed to pay $400,000 to resolve a federal whistleblower lawsuit alleging that the company had paid kickbacks in exchange for referrals of Medicare and Medicaid patients for skilled-nursing services.

== See also ==
- Home care in the United States
- Hospice care in the United States
- Long-term care
