= Benjamin Breier =

American businessman

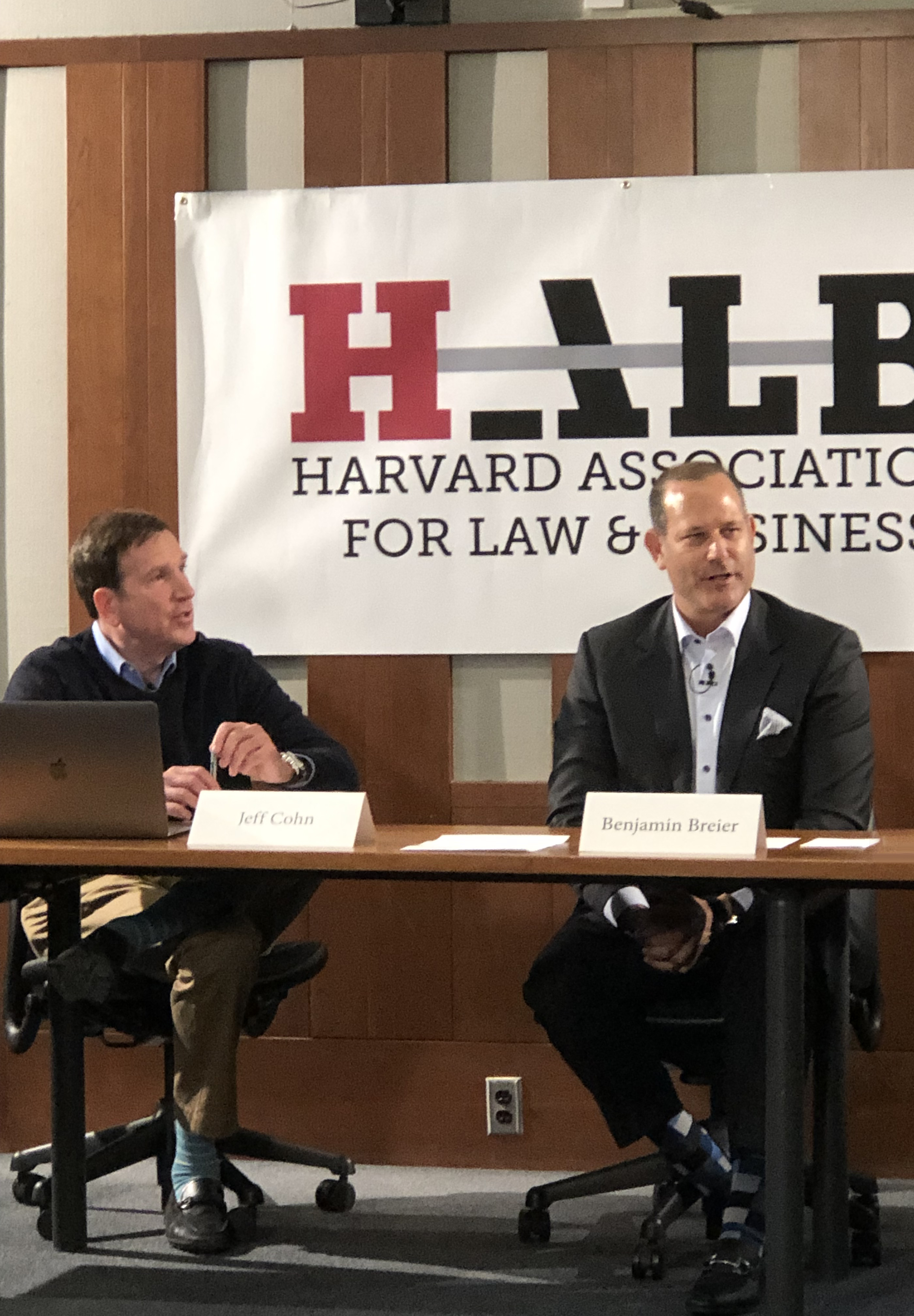
- Breier (right) in February 2019
- Born: 1971 (age 54–55)
- Education: Wharton School of the University of Pennsylvania (BS) and University of Miami (MBA and MHA)
- Occupations: President, CEO and Board Member for Kindred Healthcare

Benjamin Breier (born 1971) was chief executive office and a member of the board of directors of Kindred Healthcare from March 2015 through December 2021. He serves on the board for the Federation of American Hospitals.

== Early life and education ==
Breier grew up in Miami. His parents, Robert G. Breier and Eileen G. Breier, were both lawyers.

Breier received a B.S. in economics from the Wharton School of Business at the University of Pennsylvania in 1993 and an MBA and MHA from the University of Miami in 1995.

== Career ==
Breier's healthcare career began in Florida, where he worked as an administrator to help a hospital recover after devastation caused by Hurricane Andrew. In 1995, Breier was promoted to an assistant vice president at the hospital's system, Baptist Health Systems.

In January 1997, Breier joined Premier Practice Management, a subsidiary of Premier, Inc., as chief operating officer, and he became chief executive officer in June 1998. After Premier, Breier served as vice president of Operations at Concentra, Inc., and in 2003, he was appointed Concentra's senior vice president of operations.

In September 2019, Breier was named Chair of the Louisville Healthcare CEO Council (LHCC), which was formed in 2017 to leverage the strengths and assets of its members to solve important problems that extend beyond the scope of any one single member company.

In January 2022, Breier published a book, Intentional Disruption: Leadership Lessons in Healthcare, Business, and Beyond.

=== Kindred Healthcare ===
Breier joined Kindred Healthcare in August 2005 as president of the company's Rehabilitation Division, where he served until he was appointed president of the Hospital Division in March 2008. In August 2010, Breier was promoted to chief operating officer of Kindred, and he assumed the additional responsibilities of president of the company in May 2012. In October 2014, Kindred announced that Breier would become chief executive officer, effective March 31, 2015. The appointment took effect as Kindred was completing its acquisition of home health and hospice provider Gentiva Health Services, a transaction that created the largest diversified provider of post-acute healthcare services in the country.

In 2018, Breier oversaw a transaction with Humana, TPG Inc., and Welsh, Carson, Anderson & Stowe (WCAS) that separated Kindred into two, privately held companies, a home health care company and a specialty hospital company. Effective July 2018, Breier became president and CEO of the specialty hospital company, Kindred Healthcare. In December 2021, Breier left his position as CEO of Kindred Healthcare, as part of the transaction agreement when LifePoint Health acquired Kindred.

== Awards and honors ==
In 2010, Modern Healthcare named Breier to its Up and Comers list.

From 2015 to 2017, Modern Healthcare magazine included Breier on its list of the “100 Most Influential People in Healthcare.”
