= David Graham Forbes Chalk =

British business administrator

David Chalk

Sheriff of the City of London
- Incumbent
- Assumed office 27 September 2024
- Preceded by: Bronek Masojada
- Succeeded by: in office

Personal details
- Born: David Graham Forbes Chalk; 1959 (age 66–67) London, England
- Spouse: Miranda née Passey
- Parents: Philip Alexander Forbes Chalk FRCOG (father); Jean née Doughty (mother)
- Education: Radley College
- Alma mater: University of Edinburgh (BSc)
- Profession: Marketing; Social care
- Website: www.davidchalk.co.uk

David Graham Forbes Chalk (born 1959 at Whitechapel, London), is a British business administrator in social care, serving as Lay Sheriff of the City of London for 2024/25.

== Background and education ==
Born in 1959 at the London Hospital to surgeon, Philip Chalk (1930–2015) and Jean née Doughty, Chalk was educated at Chigwell School then Radley College, before going up to the University of Edinburgh where he read Agricultural Sciences (BSc).

== Career ==
With WPP from 1982 to 1995 as director of marketing at the Henley Centre for Forecasting, Chalk then joined City think-tank, Future Foundation as marketing partner, before in 2003 becoming director of strategy & research at Age Concern Enterprises.

Founding managing director of Windrush Care since 2015, a home care agency, Chalk was elected to the board of directors of the Homecare Association (UKHCA) in 2017, representing smaller home care businesses.

== Charitable service ==
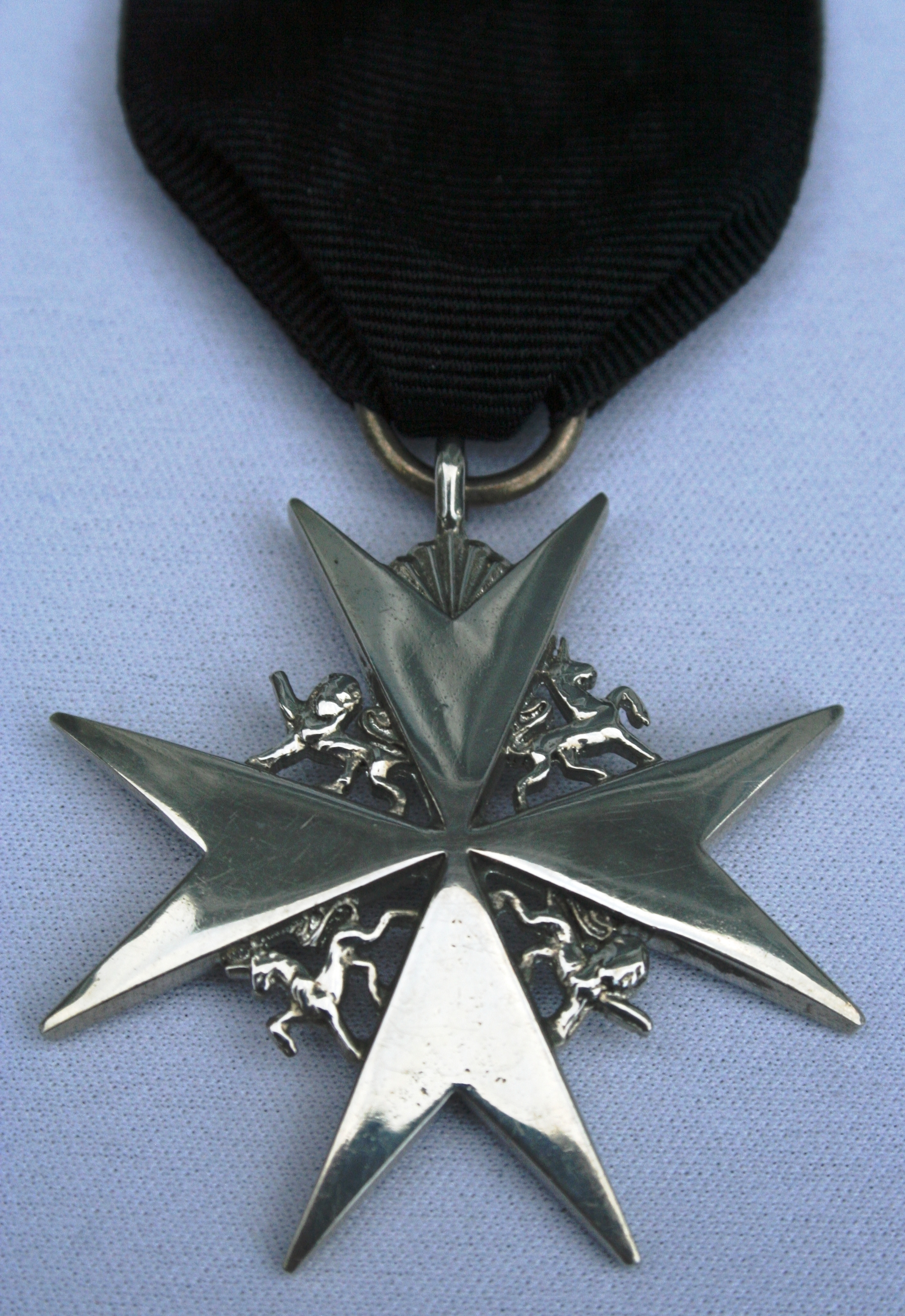
MStJ insignia

Joining the Worshipful Company of Drapers in 1982, Chalk became a Liveryman in 1986, being elected a Court Assistant in 2008, before serving as Master Draper for 2021/22.

Elected as City Lay Sheriff for 2024/25, Chalk was previously Governor of two Drapers' Company schools Thomas Adams School, Wem in Shropshire and Howell's School in Llandaff and Chairman of the Thomas Howell Education Fund for North Wales.

In 2025, Chalk was appointed MStJ.

== Family ==
David Chalk married Miranda Passey FRHS in 1985, and lives in Gloucestershire. He has two younger sisters.

Of matrilineal Scottish descent, their father was Dr Philip Chalk, a consultant obstetrician and gynaecologist at the Royal Free Hospital, who served as Master Draper for 1981/82.

Civic offices
Preceded by Bronek Masojada	Sheriff of the City of London; 2024–present With: Alderman Gregory Jones	Incumbent
