= NAHC =

NAHC may refer to:

- National Aboriginal Hockey Championships
- National Association for Home Care & Hospice
- National Association of Housing Cooperatives, an organization in the United States
- Native American Health Center, a California non-profit
- Native American Heritage Commission, a California state agency
