= Dave Chalk =

Dave Chalk may refer to:

- Dave Chalk (baseball)
- Dave Chalk (entrepreneur)
- David Graham Forbes Chalk, Sheriff of the City of London, UK in 2024-25
