= RightspotpH Indicator =

The RightSpotpH® Indicator is a medical device designed for verifying the correct placement of nasogastric and orogastric tubes. Developed by RightBio Metrics, this device uses pH measurement to confirm that feeding tubes are correctly positioned in the stomach, aiming to reduce risks associated with tube misplacement.

== Function and design ==
The RightSpotpH® Indicator is a small device that is intended to be non-invasive. The RightSpotpH® indicator measures the pH of gastric aspirates to verify tube placement. It provides a rapid method for healthcare professionals to confirm that a feeding tube has been correctly placed in the patient's stomach, without the need for radiographic confirmation.

== Clinical validation ==
The effectiveness of the RightSpotpH® Indicator has been validated through clinical studies. A significant study published in the International Journal of Emergency Medicine demonstrated that the device is sensitive and specific for determining intragastric pH levels below or above 5.5, a common threshold used for confirming nasogastric tube placement.

== Regulatory approvals ==
The RightSpotpH® Indicator received U.S. Food and Drug Administration (FDA) 510(k) clearance in 2014. It is also CLIA-waived, allowing for its use in a variety of clinical settings.

== Application in medical practice ==
The device is indicated for use in neonates, pediatrics, and adults. It is primarily used in hospital settings, particularly in emergency departments and intensive care units, where rapid and accurate verification of tube placement is crucial. The RightspotpH® indicator is also used in home care settings, allowing care takers or patients themselves to ensure their tube placement is correct.

== Comparison to traditional methods ==
While there are upsides and downsides to any particular verification method, traditional methods of verifying tube placement, such as auscultation or x-ray imaging, have limitations. Due to its nature as a non-evidence based method, auscultation is not always reliable, and x-rays expose patients to radiation and can cause significant delays in care. The aim of the RightSpotpH® Indicator is to provide a quicker, safer alternative that allows medical workers to verify tube placement in a manner that is both more timely than x-ray verification and more reliable than auscultation.

== Impact on patient safety ==
Correct placement of feeding tubes is critical for patient safety. Misplacement can lead to serious complications, including aspiration pneumonia. By providing a rapid and accurate method of verification, the RightSpotpH® Indicator may contribute to improved patient outcomes and reduced healthcare costs, though more comprehensive studies may be needed to specifically quantify these benefits.
