= Consumer Directed Personal Assistance Program =

The Consumer Directed Personal Assistance Program (CDPAP) is a Medicaid-funded home care program in New York state. The program allows eligible individuals with chronic illnesses or physical disabilities to hire, train, and supervise their own personal assistants, including family members.

== History ==
The New York State Legislature established CDPAP in 1995 under Section 365-f of the New York Social Services Law. By 2024, the program served approximately 250,000 Medicaid enrollees at an annual cost of roughly $6 billion. Annual spending rose from $1.3 billion in 2017 to more than half of total state home care expenditures by 2023. Prior to 2025, a network of approximately 600 fiscal intermediaries administered the program's payroll and administrative functions.

== 2024–2025 restructuring and lawsuits ==
In April 2024, Governor Kathy Hochul signed legislation consolidating CDPAP administration to a single statewide contractor. The New York State Department of Health selected Public Partnerships LLC (PPL), an Alpharetta, Georgia-based company, as the sole statewide contractor.

The transition took effect on April 1, 2025. Caregivers reported missed payments, incorrect wages, and lost timesheets after the transition.

On March 31, 2025, U.S. District Judge Frederic Block issued a temporary restraining order halting part of the transition. The Legal Aid Society filed a class-action lawsuit against PPL in federal court for unpaid wages. Separate litigation alleged violations of the Fair Labor Standards Act.

== Bid-rigging allegations and investigations ==
Crain's New York Business reported that state officials met with PPL and shared a 46-page implementation plan before bidding opened. These meetings contradicted the sworn testimony of the state Health Commissioner, who had denied pre-bid contact. Senator James Skoufis presented draft budget documents from the governor's office that named PPL as the designated contractor weeks before the budget was finalized.

On August 21, 2025, the New York State Senate held a joint hearing chaired by Senators Gustavo Rivera and Skoufis. PPL Vice President Patty Byrnes testified that there had been no pre-bid contact with state officials. PPL later retracted this testimony in a letter to lawmakers, acknowledging pre-bid communications with the Department of Health.

Industry representatives, including Julian Hagmann of Caring Professionals Inc., a New York home care agency, submitted testimony on PPL's operational record in other states. PPL President Maria Perrin announced her resignation in July 2025, and CEO Vince Coppola was replaced. Lieutenant Governor Antonio Delgado called for a state-led investigation into the transition.

The United States Department of Justice reportedly opened an investigation into the contract award process in 2025. Senator Skoufis proposed a constitutional amendment requiring comptroller approval of large state contracts. The Department of Health stated that the transition reduced per-consumer administrative costs from $1,000 per month to approximately $68. Governor Hochul denied allegations of impropriety in the bidding process.

== See also ==
- Healthcare in New York (state)
