= Kindred Healthcare =

U.S. healthcare company

Kindred Healthcare, LLC
- Type: Private
- Industry: Healthcare
- Founded: 1985; 41 years ago in Louisville, Kentucky, U.S.
- Headquarters: Louisville, Kentucky, U.S.
- Area served: United States
- Key people: Benjamin Breier (President & CEO); Charlie Wardrip (CIO)
- Revenue: US$6.034 billion (2017)
- Operating income: US$−166 million (2017)
- Net income: US$−698 million (2017)
- Total assets: US$5.233 billion (2017)
- Total equity: US$123 million (2017)
- Number of employees: ~38,300 (June 2018)
- Divisions: Kindred Hospitals; Kindred Rehabilitation Services; Kindred Behavioral Health
- Website: kindredhospitals.com

Kindred Healthcare is a healthcare company that operated long-term acute-care hospitals and provides rehabilitation services across the United States.

Kindred's headquarters and support center were located in Louisville, Kentucky.

In 2021, a transaction between Kindred Healthcare and LifePoint Health resulted in the creation of ScionHealth, a new healthcare system.

== History ==
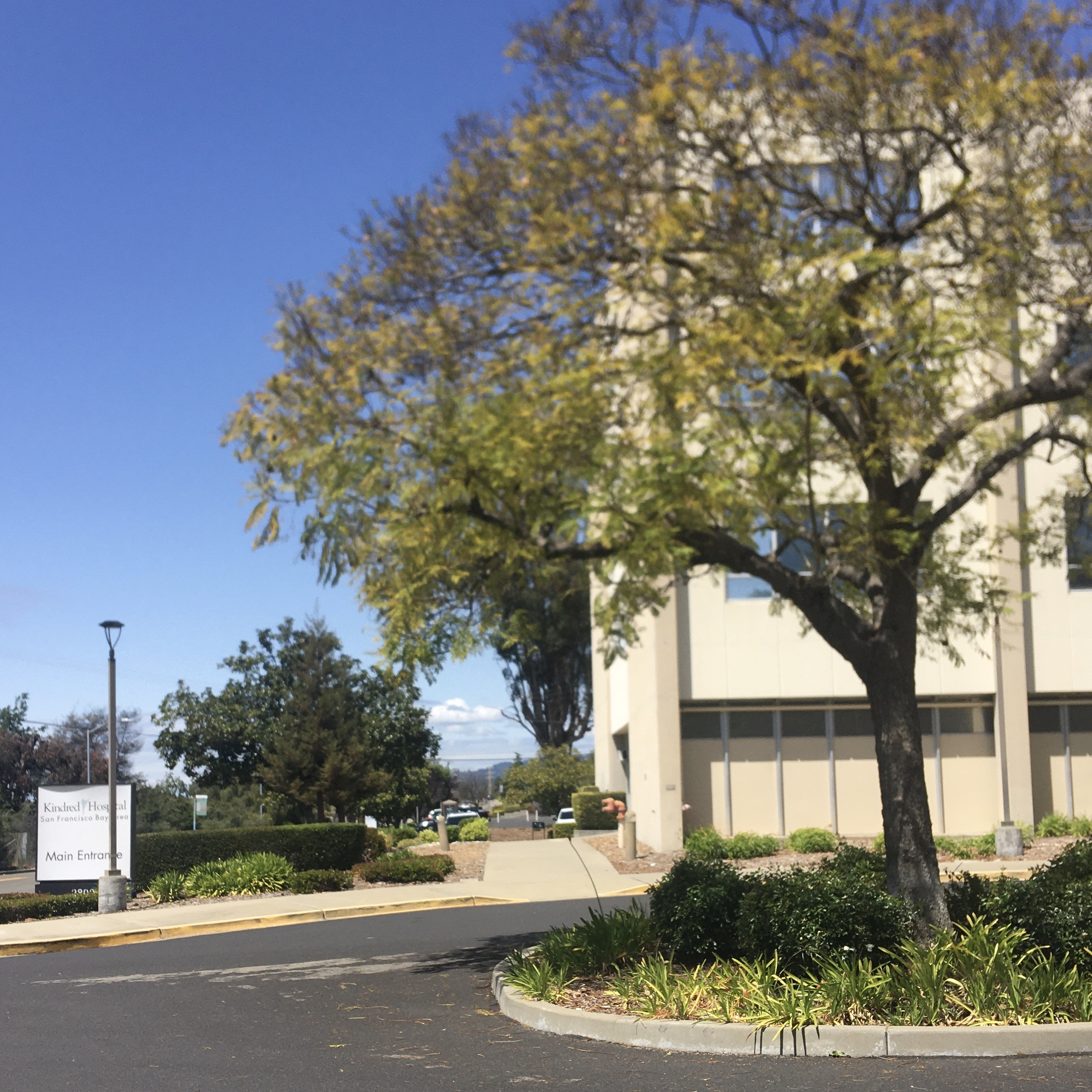
Kindred Hospital - San Francisco Bay Area in San Leandro, California operated by Kindred Healthcare

Kindred was founded in 1985 as Vencor, Inc. The name Kindred Healthcare was adopted on April 20, 2001, following Vencor's emergence from Chapter 11 bankruptcy. Kindred went public in 2001 on the New York Stock Exchange with the symbol KND.

In February 2011, Kindred Healthcare agreed to acquire RehabCare Group for approximately $900 million in cash and stock to create, at the time, the largest post-acute health care services company in the United States.

In October 2014, Kindred Healthcare, Inc. and Gentiva Health Services, a provider of home health care, hospice and related services in the United States, announced a merger agreement under which Kindred would acquire all outstanding shares of Gentiva common stock for $19.50 per share in a combination of cash and stock. The deal was officially signed into agreement effective January 31, 2015, with Gentiva becoming a wholly owned subsidiary of Kindred.

In June 2017, Kindred announced a definitive agreement with BM Eagle Holdings, LLC, a joint venture led by affiliates of BlueMountain Capital Management, to sell the company's skilled-nursing facility business for $700 million. The sale included 89 nursing centers with 11,308 licensed beds and seven assisted living facilities with 380 licensed beds, which collectively had approximately 11,500 employees in 18 states.

In December 2017, Kindred Healthcare Inc. announced that it would be acquired for approximately $4.1 billion by a consortium of three companies: TPG Capital, Welsh, Carson, Anderson & Stowe (WCAS) and Humana. The acquisition was contested by shareholder Brigade Capital Management, who filed a suit with the SEC in March 2018 and submitted a letter to Kindred's board and management arguing that the $9 per share price offered by the deal was "grossly inadequate."

Upon acquisition, the home health, hospice and community care businesses would be separated from Kindred and operated as a standalone company owned 40 percent by Humana, with the remaining 60 percent owned by TPG and WCAS. Kindred's long-term acute care hospitals, rehab hospitals and contract rehabilitation services businesses would be operated as Kindred Healthcare, a separate specialty hospital company owned by TPG and WCAS. The transaction was approved on April 5, 2018, and completed on July 2, 2018.

Kindred's stock ceased trading on the New York Stock Exchange on June 29, 2018, as it transitioned to a privately held company.

In 2019, Kindred and Jefferson County Public Schools (JCPS) launched Honeycomb classrooms, new innovation centers at local high schools, providing students with access to the latest technology.

In 2021, Kindred was acquired by LifePoint Health, a hospital chain based in Brentwood, Tennessee. A new company, ScionHealth was created and included a combination of Kindred's 61 long-term acute care hospitals and 18 of LifePoint's community hospital campuses and health systems. ScionHealth consists of 79 hospital campuses in 25 states. LifePoint combined its remaining hospitals and outpatient centers with Kindred's rehabilitation and behavioral health services.

== Divisions ==
Kindred operated three divisions: Transitional Care Hospitals, Kindred Rehabilitation Services, and Kindred Behavioral Health.

=== Transitional Care Hospital ===
The Transitional Care Hospital division provided long-term acute care services to medically complex patients. Along with traditional freestanding hospitals, Kindred operated hospital-in-hospitals (HIH) that operated in a "host hospital" to provide long term acute care to patients it received from the short-term acute care units.

In 2021, ScionHealth was created and incorporated this division.

=== Kindred Rehabilitation Services ===
Kindred's Rehabilitation division serves both Kindred and non-Kindred sites. Services are organized into two operating segments: skilled nursing rehabilitation services (SRS), in which Kindred provides contract therapy services across multiple settings including skilled nursing facilities, assisted living facilities, independent living facilities, continuing care retirement communities and outpatient facilities; and hospital rehabilitation services (HRS), in which Kindred provides inpatient program management and therapy services to standalone inpatient rehabilitation facilities, hospital units, and outpatient services to hospital-based satellite programs.

In June 2011, Kindred combined its previous rehabilitation division with its new acquisition of RehabCare, renaming the division after this acquisition.

In January 2016, Kindred Healthcare Inc. and its subsidiary RehabCare Group Inc. agreed to pay $125 million to settle a whistleblower lawsuit on Medicare therapy claim overbilling. The settlement ended an investigation into claims brought against the companies by former RehabCare therapists in a 2011 lawsuit. The suit claimed RehabCare routinely scheduled skilled nursing facility residents for higher levels of therapy than needed, resulting in therapy services were not reasonable or necessary, or never occurred.

In October 2020, Kindred Healthcare announced the sale of the RehabCare division to Select Rehabilitation. The sale was completed in December 2020.

In 2021, Kindred Rehabilitation services became a business unit of LifePoint Health.

=== Kindred Behavioral Health ===
Kindred Behavioral Health responds to the need of specialized behavioral health services that require compassion, including crisis stabilization, detoxification, mental health disorders, and other behavioral health issues.

In 2021 Kindred Behavioral Health became a business unit of LifePoint Health.

== See also ==
- List of major employers in Louisville, Kentucky
