= UP Health System - Marquette =

UP Health System Marquette
- LifePoint Hospitals

Geography
- Location: 850 West Baraga Avenue, Marquette, Michigan, United States
- Coordinates: 46.5437°N 87.4098°W

Organization
- Type: Teaching
- Affiliated university: MSU College of Human Medicine

Services
- Emergency department: Level II trauma center
- Beds: 222

Helipads
- Helipad: 76MI

History
- Founded: 2019

Links
- Website: www.uphealthsystem.com/marquette
- Lists: Hospitals in Michigan

UP Health System - Marquette (formerly Marquette General Hospital) is an American hospital and regional medical center located in Marquette, serving the Upper Peninsula of Michigan. UPHS Marquette is a Level II trauma center and a teaching hospital, affiliated with the Michigan State University College of Human Medicine.

In 2012, Michigan Attorney General Bill Schuette approved Marquette General Hospital's purchase by for-profit organization Duke LifePoint, a joint venture of Duke University Health System and LifePoint Health.

== History ==
=== St. Mary's and St. Luke's ===
Prior to 1973, Marquette had two hospitals: St. Mary's Hospital and St. Luke's Hospital. St. Mary's was founded by the Sisters of the Third Order of St. Francis of Iowa City in 1890, serving local loggers and mariners. St. Mary's moved into a new building in 1955, whose ownership passed to the State of Michigan after its merger with St. Luke's. The old St. Mary's building has housed the D.J. Jacobetti Home for Veterans since 1981.

St. Luke's Hospital, the predecessor to the Marquette General Hospital campus, opened in 1915, succeeding the already-outgrown Marquette City Hospital of 1896. St. Luke's expanded steadily through the early and mid-20th century, adding pediatric services, a nursing school, and an intensive care unit.

=== Marquette General Hospital ===
Marquette General Hospital was formed in 1973 by the merger of St. Mary's and St. Luke's. Marquette General continued to expand the former St. Luke's campus, adding more services for the growing population of the region. MGH remained a non-profit hospital, and was the largest employer in the City of Marquette.

Marquette General Hospital was certified as a level II trauma center in 2005, the only such hospital in the Upper Peninsula. Simultaneously, MGH faced serious financial difficulties, with long-term debts of $60 million and pension liabilities of $100 million. A 2007 plan for a financial turnaround was insufficient, which led to proposals to sell the hospital as early as 2010.

Following a review by the Michigan Attorney General's office, the sale of Marquette General Hospital to Duke LifePoint was approved in 2012. The Marquette General Foundation, formerly the hospital's charitable foundation, was required to be separated from the hospital's operations, and now operates as the Superior Health Foundation. The terms of the purchase agreement with Duke LifePoint included an investment of $300 million in capital improvements, $50 million towards physician recruitment, and a $23 million contribution to the Superior Health Foundation.

=== UP Health System Marquette ===
Upon its purchase of Marquette General Hospital, Duke LifePoint renamed the hospital to UP Health System - Marquette. In 2014, Duke LifePoint announced plans for a new hospital building, located on West Baraga Avenue, to replace the Marquette General Hospital campus. The construction of the new hospital was funded by Duke LifePoint, as required by the purchase agreement.

The new UP Health System Marquette opened in 2019, with most services moving to the new building. As of December 2022, some services remain on the old Marquette General Hospital campus, which is scheduled to be fully vacated by early 2024. The property was sold to the Northern Michigan University Foundation for $1, and is slated for redevelopment.

UPHS Marquette is the center of UP Health System, a three-hospital network in the Upper Peninsula operated by Duke LifePoint. UP Health System - Portage is centered on a 36-bed Level III trauma center in Hancock, providing services throughout the Copper Country. UP Health System - Bell, formerly Bell Memorial Hospital, is the Ishpeming affiliate of UPHS.

== See also ==
- UP Health System - Portage
