= Kindred Hospital - San Francisco Bay Area =

- Kindred Healthcare
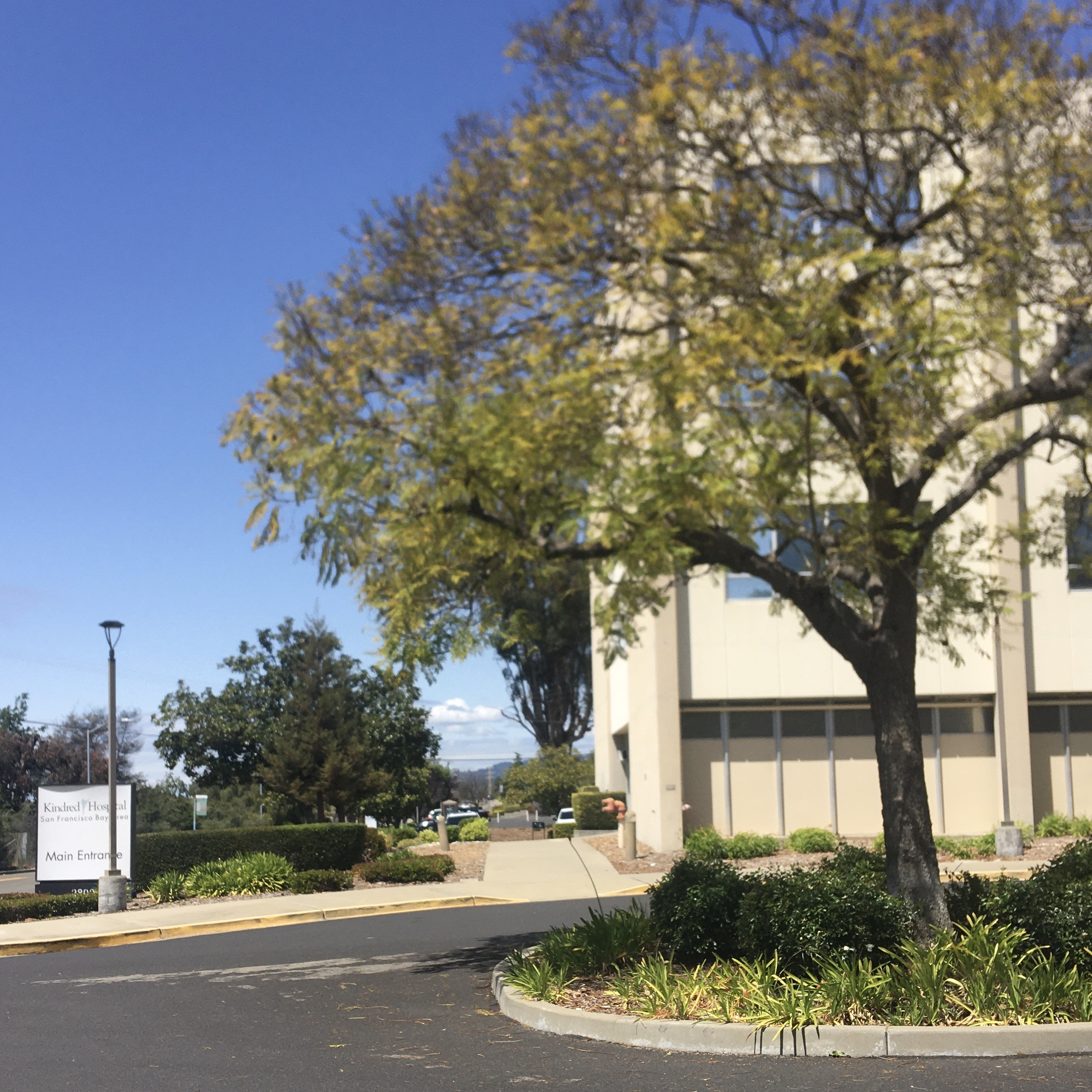

Geography
- Location: 2800 Benedict Drive, San Leandro, California, United States
- Coordinates: 37.7164°N 122.1307°W

Organization
- Care system: For-Profit, Publicly Traded
- Type: Long-term acute care facility
- Affiliated university: None

Services
- Emergency department: No Emergency Services
- Beds: 99

History
- Opened: 1962

Links
- Website: www.kindredhospitalsfba.com
- Lists: Hospitals in California

Kindred Hospital - San Francisco Bay Area is a 99-bed long-term acute care facility in San Leandro, California, US. The hospital is operated by Kindred Healthcare based in Louisville, Kentucky.

== History ==
The hospital that currently operates as Kindred Hospital- San Francisco Bay Area was founded in the early 1960s as San Leandro Memorial Hospital. In 1966, the hospital was purchased by a non-profit Christian based organization, the Vesper Society, and began operating as Vesper Memorial Hospital

The Vesper Society continued to operate Vesper Memorial as a general acute care facility until 1984, when the hospital, along with sister facility, Vesper Society Hospital in nearby Hayward, was sold to Texas-based for profit Republic Health Corporation in a $40 million transaction.

In the mid-1990s, Vencor, Inc purchased the facility and converted it from a general acute care hospital to a long-term acute care facility. In 2001, Vencor, Inc. changed its name to Kindred Healthcare and continues to operate the facility today.
