= Danielle Stone =

Canadian ice hockey player

- Born: August 20, 1990 (age 36) Prince Albert, Saskatchewan, Canada
- Height: 173 cm (5 ft 8 in)
- Weight: 68 kg (150 lb; 10 st 10 lb)
- Position: Forward
- Shoots: Left
- Played for: HV71; Leksands IF; Brynäs IF; IF Sundsvall/Timrå IK; Calgary Inferno; Saskatchewan Huskies
- Coached for: Team Saskatchewan (NAHC)
- Playing career: 2008–present

Danielle Stone (born August 20, 1990) is a Canadian ice hockey forward. She most recently played in the 2022–23 season of the Swedish Women's Hockey League (SDHL) with HV71.

== Playing career ==
=== University ===
Across 120 games with the Saskatchewan Huskies of the University of Saskatchewan, Stone scored 71 points. She was a Canada West All-Rookie selection in 2008–09.

=== Professional ===
She was drafted 16th overall by the Calgary Inferno in the 2013 Canadian Women's Hockey League (CWHL) Draft, who she would sign her first professional contract with. In her rookie CWHL season, she scored 25 points in 24 games, as the Inferno made the Clarkson Cup finals for the first time. She would only put up 9 points in 22 games in her second CWHL season, her last in the league.

In 2015, she moved to Sweden to play with IF Sundsvall/Timrå IK in the SDHL. After stepping away from hockey for the 2016–17 season, she signed with Brynäs IF. In the 2017–18 season, she scored 4 points in 12 games with Brynäs. Stone signed with Leksands IF for the 2018–19 season, where she scored 30 points in 36 games, leading the team in goals and setting personal career records in both goals and assists in a season. In May 2019, she left Leksands along with teammate Anna Borgqvist to sign with HV71.

== Personal life ==
Stone is Métis. Growing up, she received a grant allocation through Métis Nation—Saskatchewan toward her pursuits in sport.

As a youth athlete, Stone was active in multiple sports, including basketball, ice hockey, track and field, soccer, and volleyball. She was a standout sprint and middle-distance runner during high school, earning ten provincial track medals and setting multiple records at the city or district level. Representing Team Saskatchewan at the 2008 North American Indigenous Games in Cowichan, British Columbia, she won silver medals in the 100 metres, 200 metres, 400 metres, and long jump events.

Stone represented Team Saskatchewan at the National Aboriginal Hockey Championships (NAHC) in 2009 and 2010. Team Sask won bronze in 2009, due in part to Stone's offensive production – she led all tournament players in points and was named to the All-Star team. She has served as a coach to Team Saskatchewan at the NAHC since 2011.

She is married to a Finnish retired ice hockey player and former HV71 teammate Sanni Hakala.
