= Direct Payments =

Payment for social care services

The Direct Payments scheme is a UK Government initiative in the field of Social Services which gives money directly to service users, enabling them to pay for their own care, rather than the traditional route of a Local Government Authority providing care for them. The Cabinet Office Strategy Unit calls direct payments "the most successful public policy in the area of social care".

Direct Payments are seen as making an important contribution to the independence, well being and quality of life of people with disabilities. When introduced, they were seen as a victory for the rights of disabled people.

== Development ==
Direct Payments were set up with the Community Care (Direct Payments) Act (1996) which came into force in April 1997 and was initially available only to a specific subsection of people qualifying for social care. The Act gave local authorities in Britain and Northern Ireland, the powers to make cash payments to disabled people. Initially, this was confined to people under age 65 years with physical and sensory impairments, learning difficulties and mental health problems. It was later amended to include older people, 16- and 17-year-olds, parents of disabled children and in England, Wales and Northern Ireland only, carers caregivers. This gave local authorities and health and social services trusts, the option of whether to allocate direct payments or maintain existing models of service provision. This led to an uneven development of direct payments across the UK with particularly poor uptake in Scotland.

The Carers and Disabled Children Act (2000) allowed parents of disabled children in England and Wales to receive direct payments, and 16 and 17 year olds to receive them in their own right. Changes set out in the Health and Social Care Act (2001) which came into effect in 2003, sought to challenge this pattern by setting in place a mandatory duty on all local authorities to offer direct payments to all eligible people requesting one.

== Direct Payments in Practice ==
Direct Payments are intended to empower service users by allowing them control and choice over the services they use to meet their needs. Each person on the scheme is given an amount of money to be managed by themselves, possibly with the aid of others such as family or an external advocacy organisation. This money can be used to purchase any service or services that meet the person's assessed needs. As the money given to the person is given in lieu of the local authority providing the care, the money remains public money belonging to the local government who makes the payments. Users must, therefore, account for the money every step of the way so the local government can maintain its auditing requirements.

There is however, no requirement for a person to receive the entirety of their care needs through direct payments, people are free to mix direct payments for some of their needs with traditional methods of care provision. Direct Payments can be used to directly employ a personal assistant (in this case the Direct Payments recipient may legally be classed as an employer with all the responsibilities this entails under UK law) or hire care workers from a private domiciliary care agency. As an alternative to care services, the recipient may be able to use his or her Direct Payments to fund other local services that enable their independence within their own home and community, such as 'meals on wheels', taxi cabs and social clubs.
