= Odyssey Healthcare =

Hospice company

Odyssey Healthcare, Inc.
- Company type: For-profit (formerly); Subsidiary
- Industry: Healthcare
- Founded: 1995
- Founder: Richard R. Burnham, David Steffy, David Gasmire
- Fate: Acquired by Gentiva Health Services in 2010
- Headquarters: Atlanta, Georgia (formerly Dallas, Texas), U.S.
- Area served: United States
- Products: Hospice services
- Brands: Odyssey Hospice
- Services: Hospice health care
- Net income: $3.1 million (2000) (2000)
- Owner: Gentiva Health Services, Inc. (since 2010)
- Parent: Gentiva Health Services, Inc.

Odyssey Healthcare, Inc. (now operating as a subsidiary of Gentiva Health Services, Inc.) is a for-profit provider of hospice services that was co-founded in 1995 by Richard R. Burnham, David Steffy, and David Gasmire. The company was a health care startup that opened its first hospice location in 1996. The company that was formerly based in Dallas, TX and now in Atlanta, Georgia, is one of the largest providers of hospice health care and related services in the United States.

Odyssey Healthcare, Inc. offers various health services to patients and families through its 100 Medicare-certified programs currently available in 30 states. Odyssey Hospice has locations in Alabama, Arizona, Arkansas, California, Colorado, Delaware, Florida, Georgia, Illinois, Indiana, Louisiana, Massachusetts, Michigan, Mississippi, Missouri, Nebraska, Nevada, New Jersey, New Mexico, Ohio, Oregon, Pennsylvania, Rhode Island, South Carolina, Tennessee, Texas, Utah, Virginia, Washington and Wisconsin.

== History ==
In 2001, Odyssey Healthcare made the decision to make its first initial public offering (IPO) of stock after finishing its first profitable year in 2000. The net income recorded for 2000 was approximately $3.1 million.

In October 2004, Odyssey decreased its profit projections and announced that it had been under investigation by the United States Department of Justice since the prior month. Odyssey was being investigated under the False Claims Act for its operations regarding patient admissions, patient retention and billing practices. On October 18, 2004, as a result of the investigation and lower financial projections, Odyssey's investors lost $289 million, with its shares dropping 47 percent. At the time, Odyssey operated 72 hospices in 30 states.

In 2010, Gentiva Health Services entered into an agreement to buy Odyssey Healthcare for about $1 billion in cash with Odyssey common stock valued at $27 per share. At the completion of the acquisition, the combined home health and hospice operations had about 14,000 patients.
