= Home care in the United States =

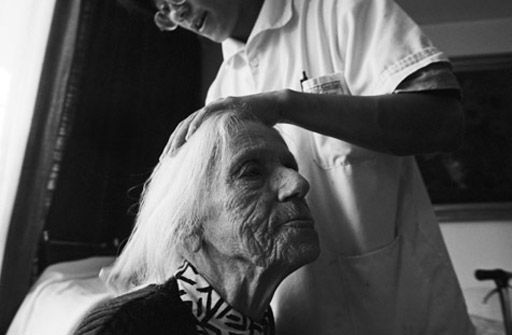
Outpatient elder care

Home care (also referred to as domiciliary care, social care, or in-home care) is supportive care provided in the home. Care may be provided by licensed healthcare professionals who provide medical treatment needs or by professional caregivers who provide daily assistance to ensure the activities of daily living (ADLs) are met. In-home medical care is often and more accurately referred to as home health care or formal care. Home health care is different non-medical care, custodial care, or private-duty care which refers to assistance and services provided by persons who are not nurses, doctors, or other licensed medical personnel. For patients recovering from surgery or illness, home care may include rehabilitative therapies. For terminally ill patients, home care may include hospice care.

Home health services help adults, seniors, and pediatric clients who are recovering after a hospital or facility stay, or need additional support to remain safely at home and avoid unnecessary hospitalization. These Medicare-certified services may include short-term nursing, rehabilitative, therapeutic, and assistive home health care. This care is provided by registered nurses (RNs), licensed practical nurses (LPN's), physical therapists (PTs), occupational therapists (OTs), speech language pathologists (SLPs), unlicensed assistive personnel (UAPs), home health aides (HHAs), home care agencies (HCAs) and medical social workers (MSWs) as a limited number of up to one hour visits, addressed primarily through the Medicare Home Health benefit. Paid individual providers can also provide health services through programs such as California's In-Home Supportive Services (IHSS), or may be paid privately.

The largest segment of home care consists of licensed and unlicensed non-medical personnel, including caregivers who assist the care seeker. Care assistants may help the individual with daily tasks such as bathing, cleaning the home, preparing meals, and offering the recipient support and companionship. Caregivers work to support the needs of individuals who require such assistance. These services help the client to stay at home versus living in a facility. Non-medical home care is paid for by the individual or family. The term "private-duty" refers to the private pay nature of these relationships. Home care (non-medical) has traditionally been privately funded as opposed to home health care which is task-based and government or insurance funded. California's In-Home Supportive Services (IHSS) also offers financial support for employing a non-medical caregiver.

These traditional differences in home care services are changing as the average age of the population has risen. Individuals typically desire to remain independent and use home care services to maintain their existing lifestyle. Government and Insurance providers are beginning to fund this level of care as an alternative to facility care. In-Home Care is often a lower cost solution to long-term care facilities.

Home care has also been increasingly performed in settings other than clients' homes, as home workers have begun assisting with travel and performing errands. While this has been increasingly performed for younger populations with disabilities, these changes may also reframe the concept of home care in the future.

== Overview ==
"Home care", "home health care" and "in-home care" are phrases that have been used interchangeably in the United States to mean any type of care—skilled or otherwise—given to a person in their own home. Home care aims to make it possible for people to remain at home rather than use residential, long-term, or institutional-based nursing care.

Non-medical in-home care is also called companion care or unskilled care. It is a valuable service for seniors in need of household help, social interaction, or transportation to appointments. Home care is most utilized by elderly people who live alone with impairments with their activities of daily living and have low social support. For those with adequate social and familial support, home care is delayed until the impairment level becomes severe or their caregiver is no longer able to support them independently. Home care services include help with daily tasks such as meal preparation, medication reminders, laundry, light housekeeping, errands, shopping, transportation, and companionship.

Home health care is medical in nature and is provided by licensed, skilled healthcare professionals. Home health care providers deliver services in the client's own home. Professional home health services may include medical or psychological assessment, wound care, pain management, disease education and management, physical therapy, speech therapy, or occupational therapy. Home care is often an integral component of the post-hospitalization recovery process, especially during the initial weeks after discharge when the patient still requires some level of regular physical assistance. Patients who received home health care after being discharged from the hospital are associated with decrease in use of the healthcare system, hospital readmission, and death. These services may include some combination of professional health care services and life assistance services.

- Activities of daily living (ADL) refers to activities, including bathing, dressing, transferring, using the toilet, eating, and walking, that reflect the patient's capacity for self-care.
- Instrumental activities of daily living (IADL) refer to daily tasks, including light housework, preparing meals, taking medications, shopping for groceries or clothes, using the telephone, and managing money, which enables the patient to live independently in the community.

While there are differences in terms used in describing aspects of home care or home health care in the United States and other areas of the world, for the most part the descriptions are very similar. However, there may be cultural differences in home care due to different familial structures; multigenerational households, multiple households, same-sex parents and single-parent families can compose networks of culturally diverse individuals who require home care. Decisions may be made by one dominant authority in the structure or through the collective community.

Estimates for the U.S. indicate that most home care is informal, with families and friends providing a substantial amount of care. For formal care, the health care professionals most often involved are nurses followed by physical therapists and home care aides. Other health care providers include respiratory and occupational therapists, medical social workers and mental health workers. Home health care is generally paid for by Medicaid, Medicare, long term insurance, or paid with the patient's own resources.

There is, however, a distinction made on a state-by-state basis according to how each state regulates the home care industry. In New York State, for example, "home health care" is used to describe medical services performed at home by a healthcare professional, whereas "home care" describes non-medical, private duty care. Other states do not make the same distinction, but the difference between the two must be accounted for when dealing with Medicare reimbursements. In most cases, when ordered by a physician, Medicare will pay for short-term medically necessary services provided in a home setting. A senior who requires only non-medical care, will NOT qualify for Medicare coverage of these services.

== Professionals providing care ==
Professionals providing home health care include licensed practical nurses, registered nurses, physical therapists, occupational therapists and social workers. Rehabilitation services may be provided by physical therapists, occupational therapists, speech and language pathologists and dietitians. Professionals can be independent practitioners, part of a larger organization, or part of a franchise.

Home care aides, Certified Nursing Assistants (CNAs), and caregivers are trained to provide non-custodial or non-medical care, such as help with dressing, bathing, getting in and out of bed, and using the toilet. They may also prepare meals, accompany the client to medical visits, grocery shop, provide companionship and do various other errands.

== Home health software ==
Home health care software or home care software falls under the broad category of Health care Information Technology (HIT). HIT is "the application of information processing involving both computer hardware and software that deals with the storage, retrieval, sharing, and use of health care information, data, and knowledge for communication and decision making"

== Aide worker qualifications ==
The state department of health issues requirement for that state. Workers can take an examination to become a state tested Certified Nursing Assistant (CNA). Other requirements in the U.S.A. often include a background check, drug testing, and general references.

== Licensure and providers by state ==
California usually requires a state license for medical, non-medical and hospice agencies. All the HHAs operating in California are required to be licensed by the California Department of Public Health and are usually also certified by the Centers for Medicare and Medicaid Services. However, due to the recent demand in provider services in home care for elderly populations and populations with disabilities, there has been an increase in care by providers who are not licensed or certified who are associated with HCAs or private organizations.

Full-service agencies do pre-employment background checks, including (criminal), department of motor vehicle, and reference checks. Full-service agencies also train, monitor, and supervise the staff that provide care to clients in their home.

There is a certification available for home care companies in California, administered by the California Association for Health Services at Home.

Florida is a licensure state which requires different levels of licensing depending upon the services provided. Companion assistance is provided by a home maker companion agency whereas nursing services and assistance with ADLs can be provided by a home health agency or nurse registry. The state licensing authority is the Florida Agency for Health Care Administration.

== Compensation ==
Compensation varies according to discipline, but the Bureau of Labor Statistics estimates that the 2021 median hourly wage for home health aides was $13.52 per hour. There is a fair deal of variance in the compensation offered to Home health aides across different states. For example, Alaska had the highest annual wage of approximately $29,100 and West Virginia on the other end of the spectrum had the average salary of $18,020.

=== Supreme Court case relating to fees ===
Since 1974 until 2015, home care work was classified as a "companionship service" and exempted from federal overtime and minimum wage rules under the Fair Labor Standards Act. The Supreme Court considered arguments on the companionship exemption in a case brought by a home care worker represented by counsel provided by Service Employees International Union. This 2003 case, Evelyn Coke v. Long Island Care at Home, Ltd. and Maryann Osborne, argued that agency-employed home caregivers should be covered under overtime and minimum wage regulations.

Evelyn Coke, a home care worker employed by a home care agency that was not paying her overtime, sued the agency in 2003, alleging that the regulation construing the "companionship services" exemption to apply to agency employees and exempt them from the federal minimum wage and overtime law is inconsistent with the law. The Supreme Court heard the case in 2009.

In the court decision, the court stated the Fair Labor Standards Amendments of 1974 exempted from the minimum wage and maximum hours rules of the FSLA persons "employed in domestic service employment to provide companionship services for individuals ... unable to care for themselves." 29 U. S. C. §213(a)(15). The court found that the power of the Department of Labor (DOL) to administer a congressionally created program necessarily requires the making of rules to fill any 'gap' left, implicitly or explicitly, by Congress, and when that agency fills that gap reasonably, it is binding. In this case, one of the gaps was whether to include workers paid by third parties in the exemption and the DOL had done that. Since the DOL followed public notice procedure, and since there was a gap left in the legislation, the DOLs regulation stood and home health care workers were not covered by either minimum wage or overtime pay requirements (but see below).

=== Department of Labor rule ===
A rule issued from the DOL, entitled "Application of the Fair Labor Standards Act to Domestic Service," and meant to be effective from 1 January 2015, was written to revise "the definition of 'companionship services' to clarify and narrow the duties that fall within the term; in addition third party employers, such as home care agencies, will not be able to claim either of the exemptions [from federal overtime or minimum wage rules.] The major effect of this Final Rule [would be] that more domestic service workers will be protected by the FLSA's minimum wage, overtime, and record keeping provisions." However, Home Care Associates of America, the International Franchise Association (IFA), and the National Association for Home Care & Hospice sued the DOL in regards to the rule, and a federal district court threw out the rule. The Labor Department then appealed. In August 2015, the rule was upheld by the United States Court of Appeals for the District of Columbia Circuit.

== Payment for home care ==
Medicare often is the primary billing source, if this is the primary carrier between two types of insurance (like between Medicare and Medicaid). Also, if a patient has Medicare and that patient has a "skilled need" requiring nursing visits, the patient's case is typically billed under Medicare.

Private insurance includes VA (Veterans Administration), some Railroad or Steelworkers health plans or other private insurance. "Self/family" indicates "private pay" status, when the patient or family pays 100% of all home care charges. Home care fees can be quite high; few patients & families can absorb these costs for a long period of time.

== Types of services ==
Home care services are available to individuals who require intermittent or part-time skilled nursing care and/or rehabilitation therapies. The typical services available under the designated term "home care" include nursing care, such as changing dressings, monitoring medications, providing basic daily activities like bathing, short term rehabilitation, occupational and speech therapy. Some home health providers also include non-medical homemaker services including meal preparation, shopping, transportation, and some specific household chores.

The types of services available for home care have expanded throughout the history of the United States health care system due to continuous modernization of medical technology, particularly in the 1980s. Prior to the expansion, specialty services like intravenous antibiotics, oncology therapy, hemodialysis, parenteral and enteral nutrition and ventilator care, were only available in the hospital setting. This newly available technology has proven cost effective and improves the quality of life, increasing independence and flexibility for patients.

Hospice care is a method of care that can be included in the home care realm, but is also available as in inpatient service. Hospice is a cluster of comprehensive services for the terminally ill with a medically determined life expectancy of 6 months or less. Whether hospice services are performed at home or in a medical facility, the emphasis of care are the same; pain and symptom management, which is referred to as palliation.

Pediatric home care offers assistance for young children born with low birth weight, chronic and long term conditions, acute physical conditions, mental health support, chemotherapy, and others.

The available home care services are provided by a mix of physicians, registered nurses, licensed vocational nurses, physical therapists, social workers, speech language pathologists, occupational therapists, registered dietitians, home care aides, homemaker and chore workers, companions and volunteers.

== Research and program accreditation ==
In 2002, Lotus Shyu & Lee found that providing home nursing care is more suitable for patients rather than in-house nursing-home care for patients that are not seriously ill and who do not need the services after discharge from the hospital. In another 2002 article, Modin and Furhoff regarded the roles of patients' doctors as more crucial than their nurses and care workers. However, from an epidemiological standpoint, the risks of some community acquired infections are higher from home nursing than from inpatient nursing home care. In regards to financial expenditure, home nursing care is more cost effective than inpatient nursing home care. The quality aspect of home nursing was reviewed in a 2001 article in the Journal of Nursing Care Quality. In 2011, Christensen & Grönvall published a study of the challenges and opportunities of providing communication technologies supporting the cooperation between home care workers and family members. Although they provide home care for older adults in cooperation, family members and care workers harbour diverging attitudes and values towards their joint efforts. This situation is a challenge for the design of information and computer technology (ICT) for home care.

== See also ==
- Carers' rights
- Caring for people with dementia
- Early postnatal hospital discharge
- Elderly care
- Home care in the United Kingdom
- Nursing home care
- Transgenerational design
- Unlicensed assistive personnel
