= Home care in the United Kingdom =

Home care in the United Kingdom (also referred to as domiciliary care, social care, homecare or in-home care) is supportive care provided for older and disabled people in their own homes. Social care is non-medical and is concerned with providing support, often daily, to help to ensure that the activities of daily living needs (ADLs) are met.

== Home care providers ==
Home care is purchased by the service user directly from independent home care agencies or as part of the statutory responsibility of social services departments of local authorities who either provide care by their own employees, commission services from independent agencies, or provide direct payments so that individuals care purchase their own care services. Care can also be purchased directly from independent carers or via care platforms. Care is usually provided once or twice a day with the aim of keeping frail or disabled people healthy and independent though can extend to full-time help by a live-in nurse or professional carer. In England, home care providers need to be registered with Care Quality Commission (CQC) before they can provide the regulated activity of personal care in the community.

The United Kingdom Home Care Association is the trade organisation for providers of care at home.

== Statutory regulation ==
Home care agencies are regulated by statutory bodies in three of the four home nations. The regulator's function is to ensure that home care agencies work within the applicable legislation.

=== England ===
The regulator is the Care Quality Commission (CQC), which acts as the independent regulator for health and adult social care in England.

Legislation

- The Health and Social Care Act 2008
- The Health and Social Care Act 2008 (Regulated Activities) Regulations 2010

=== Wales ===
The regulator is Care and Social Services Inspectorate Wales (CSSIW).

Legislation

- The Care Standards Act 2000
- The Domiciliary Care Agencies (Wales) Regulations 2004

=== Scotland ===
The regulator is the Care Commission.

Legislation

- The Regulation of Care (Scotland) Act 2001

=== Northern Ireland ===
The regulator is the Regulation and Quality Improvement Authority (RQIA). As of December 2007, legislation covering the homecare sector in Northern Ireland is not yet fully operational.

Legislation

- The Health and Personal Social Services (Quality, Improvement and Regulation)(Northern Ireland) Order 2003
- Domiciliary Care Agency Regulations (Northern Ireland) 2007
- Domiciliary Care Agencies National Minimum Standards (not published as at December 2007)

== Issues in home care ==
The precise arrangements of a care package can have implications for planning law. Residential institutions fall into Class C2 while residential dwellings fall into Class C3. This distinction can have significant planning and development implications.

The COVID-19 pandemic in the United Kingdom saw a huge acceleration in digital transformation in the sector. Digital systems were used to create mandatory reminders for hand washing, symptom checking and sanitisation. Risk assessment forms, care plans and induction documents were digitised.

The number of domiciliary care jobs overtook the number of roles in care homes in 2020. In 2021 the workforce in CQC regulated non-residential care services increased by 40,000 jobs or about 7%, while the number of care home jobs remained stable, or began to decrease.

The vacancy rate in homecare reached 13.5% in May 2022. After the removal of the Infection Control and Testing Fund at the end of March 2022, 96% of homecare workers got no or low pay whilst isolating after a positive COVID-19 test, causing many to leave for jobs where isolation is not required or full sick pay is available. Increasing fuel prices are also a significant issue.

== See also ==
- Community mental health service
- Home care
- Nursing home care in the United Kingdom
- Home care in the United States
