= Gentiva Health Services =

American health care company

- Type: Private
- Industry: Health care
- Headquarters: Atlanta, Georgia, United States
- Number of locations: 500+ health care locations
- Area served: United States
- Services: Health care Hospice; Palliative care Home Health
- Divisions: Hospice
- Website: www.gentivahs.com

Gentiva Health Services is a provider of home health care, hospice, and related health services in the United States. The company is headquartered in Atlanta, Georgia. Prior to its October 2014 acquisition by Kindred Healthcare, it was a Fortune 1000 company with over $1.7 billion in annual revenue and a member of the S&P 600 index.

The company offers a range of services, including nursing, physical, occupational, and speech-language therapy, cardiac and pulmonary care, disease, pain management, and other health and medical services.

As of 2024, Gentiva provides health services from more than 590 U.S. locations in 38 states.

== History ==
Gentiva Health Services was founded on August 6, 1999, when Olsten Corporation split off its healthcare assets to form an independent, public company. Olsten Corporation was founded in 1946 by William Olsten. The company grew through the 1950s, 1960s, and 1970s. In 1971, it began focusing on its health care division under the name Olsten Healthcare. In the 1990s, its health care division began acquiring other companies. The division acquired Upjohn's health services division. Following its acquisition of Lifetime Corporation, which included Office Angels, the company became the largest provider of home healthcare services in the nation, operating as Olsten Kimberly QualityCare. In 1995, Olsten Kimberly QualityCare launched CareCentrix. A year later, after acquiring Quantum Health Resources, Gentiva began offering home-based pharmaceutical infusion services. That same year, it acquired NeuroCare Rehab Without Walls, and became the sole national provider of neurorehabilitation for Cigna. It also acquired Nurses House Call. In 1997, it changed its name to Olsten Health Services.

In 1999, Olsten Corporation split its healthcare division into an independent, publicly traded company on the Nasdaq exchange, named Gentiva Health Services. In its first three years of independent operation, Gentiva launched its Gentiva Orthopedics, Gentiva Cardiopulmonary, and Safe Strides programs, and it sold its pharmaceutical services division to Accredo for $415 million in cash and stock and its health care staffing unit to InteliStaf Holdings Inc. and The Carlyle Group.

The company expanded into hospice with the 2006 acquisition of the Healthfield Group, a home health and hospice provider with 130 locations, for $454 million. In 2008, it launched its neurorehabilitation and senior health programs.

In 2009, Gentiva moved its headquarters from Melville, New York, to Atlanta. By 2010, the company acquired First HomeCare of Houston, Heritage Home Care Services, The Healthfield Group, Gilbert's Home Health and Hospice, Physicians Home Health Care, and Hospice of Charleston. In that same year, it acquired Mid-State Home Health, Magna Home Health, and Medicare-Certified offices of Coordinated Home HealthCare. In 2011, the company sold its majority stake in CareCentrix to Water Street Healthcare Partners. In 2011, the company closed or divested 34 home health branches and nine hospice branches and sold its IDOA business to Premier Home Health Care Services, which was acquired Odyssey Healthcare and sold its Rehab Without Walls business to Southern Home Care Services.

The company's $1 billion purchase of Odyssey Healthcare was the largest hospice acquisition in U.S. history. In 2012, it acquired Advocate Hospice, Family Home Care Corporation and North Mississippi Hospice. In October 2013, the company acquired Harden Healthcare Holdings and Hope Hospice.

On October 9, 2014, Kindred Healthcare and Gentiva announced that the companies had entered into a definitive merger agreement under which Kindred would acquire all of the outstanding shares of Gentiva common stock. The agreement was unanimously approved by the boards of directors of both companies. The transaction was valued at $1.8 billion, including the assumption of net debt. The deal was officially signed into agreement effective January 31, 2015, with Gentiva becoming a wholly owned subsidiary of Kindred Healthcare, operating as Kindred at Home. David Causby was appointed President and Chief Operating Officer of the Kindred at Home businesses, which included home health, hospice, palliative, and community care offerings.

In December 2017, it was announced that Kindred at Home would be acquired by Humana, along with private equity firms TPG Capital and Welsh, Carson Anderson & Stowe, for approximately $4 billion. In July 2018 the deal was completed and Kindred at Home retained services for home health, hospice and personal care services.

In August 2021, Humana acquired full ownership of Kindred at Home for $5.7 billion.

In August 2022, Humana completed its divestiture of Kindred at Home's hospice and personal care divisions, which were acquired by Clayton Dubilier & Rice (CD&R) and restructured into Gentiva.

In November 2023, Gentiva completed the acquisition of ProMedica's home health, palliative, and hospice business after receiving all necessary regulatory approvals. The deal included the transition of over 4,000 ProMedica employees to Gentiva and plans were made for transition between the companies. ProMedica's hospice and home health locations will be rebranded to Heartland Hospice and Heartland Home Health respectively by early 2024, while its palliative care services will adopt the Empatia Palliative Care brand under Gentiva.

In December 2024, Gentiva sold its personal-care operations, which served more than 16,000 patients per day in seven states, to Addus HomeCare for $350 million.

== Divisions ==
=== Hospice ===
The hospice division operates in more than 470 locations in 38 states. The division is separated into five geographic regions, which in turn are further separated into geographic operating areas, each of which includes branch locations.

Hospice includes services for managing pain and symptoms, emotional and spiritual challenges and everything included in the bereavement process.

=== Palliative ===
Gentiva's palliative care division has between 400 and 500 patients and enrolled 30 to 50 new patients weekly, as of 2023.

=== Home health ===
The home health division consists of direct home nursing and therapy services operations. As of 2024 the home health segment operated in 7 states.
