= UP Health System - Portage =

Hospital in Michigan, United States

UP Health System Portage
- LifePoint Hospitals

Geography
- Location: 500 Campus Drive, Hancock, Michigan, United States
- Coordinates: 47°8′24″N 88°35′13″W

Services
- Emergency department: Level III trauma center
- Beds: 36

History
- Founded: 1896

Links
- Website: www.uphealthsystem.com/portage
- Lists: Hospitals in Michigan

UP Health System - Portage is a hospital and associated healthcare system based in the Keweenaw Peninsula of Michigan. The healthcare system has several clinics stretching as far north as Lake Linden, Michigan and as far south as offices in L'Anse, Michigan and Ontonagon, Michigan. The system's main building is a 36-bed hospital in Hancock, Michigan. The Portage Health Hospital employs more than 800 people, and is the second largest employer in Houghton County, behind Michigan Technological University. The hospital is one of two in the state of Michigan to be recognized as a Level III trauma center by the American College of Surgeons.

== Services ==
=== Inpatient Services ===
- Family Birthing Center
- Elderly/disabled (Intermediate nursing care)
- End-of-life services (Hospice, Pain management and Palliative care)
- Hospitalists
- Infection isolation room
- Cancer services

=== Outpatient Services ===
- Breast cancer screening/mammograms
- Certified trauma center
- Chemotherapy
- Fitness center
- Geriatric services
- Home health services
- Kidney dialysis
- Physical rehabilitation
- Sleep center
- Stop-smoking program
- Sports medicine
- Urgent-care center
- Women's health
- Wound management services
- Patient/Family Support Services

=== Ambulance Services ===
- Help with government services
- Chaplaincy/pastoral care services
- Cancer services
- Patient support groups
- Patient representative/ombudsman
- Transportation for elderly/handicapped
- Translation services

== Facilities ==
- Portage Health - Hancock
- Portage Health University Center
- Portage Health - Houghton
- Portage Health - Lake Linden
- Portage Health - Ontonagon

== History ==
Portage Health was founded in 1896 as St. Joseph's Hospital in Hancock, Michigan. It was set up in Bishop John Vertin's home, and stayed there until 1904 when St. Joseph's Hospital opened in a new building on Water Street. The hospital received accreditation by the American College of Surgeons in 1924, becoming the first Copper Country hospital to become accredited, and one of just 14 in the state at the time. In 1949, the hospital began building a new building on Michigan Avenue. In 1972 St. Joseph's Hospital became St. Joseph's Community Hospital. In 1976 the Sisters of St. Joseph of Carondelet transferred ownership to the community, and the name was changed to Portage View Hospital. In 1995 the name was changed, this time to Portage Health System, and in 2000 the hospital moved to its current building on Campus Drive in Hancock.

== See also ==
- UP Health System - Marquette
