= Early postnatal hospital discharge =

Discharge from hospital within 48 hours

Early postnatal hospital discharge generally refers to the postpartum hospital discharge of the mother and newborn within 48 hours. The duration of what is considered "early discharge" varies between countries from 12 to 72 hours due to the differences in average duration of hospital stay. The World Health Organization recommends healthy mothers and newborns following an uncomplicated vaginal delivery at a health facility to stay and receive care at the facility for at least 24 hours after delivery. This recommendation is based on findings that suggest that the first 24 hours after giving birth pose the greatest risks for both the mother and newborn.

The length of postnatal hospital stay has changed internationally since the 19th century when giving birth at hospitals was first introduced. Following World War II, the length of postnatal hospital discharge has been declining, leading to global increases in early postnatal hospital discharge.

Conclusions regarding the effects of early postnatal hospital discharge on mothers and newborns remain unclear. This is due to inconsistency of the definition of early postnatal hospital discharge, methodologies and clinical interventions between research studies. Research findings have suggested adverse effects for mothers regarding breastfeeding and depression, whereas others have suggested no differences and even positive effects. Similarly, mixed conclusions have been found on the influence of early postnatal hospital discharge on the morbidity of newborns.

== Historical overview ==
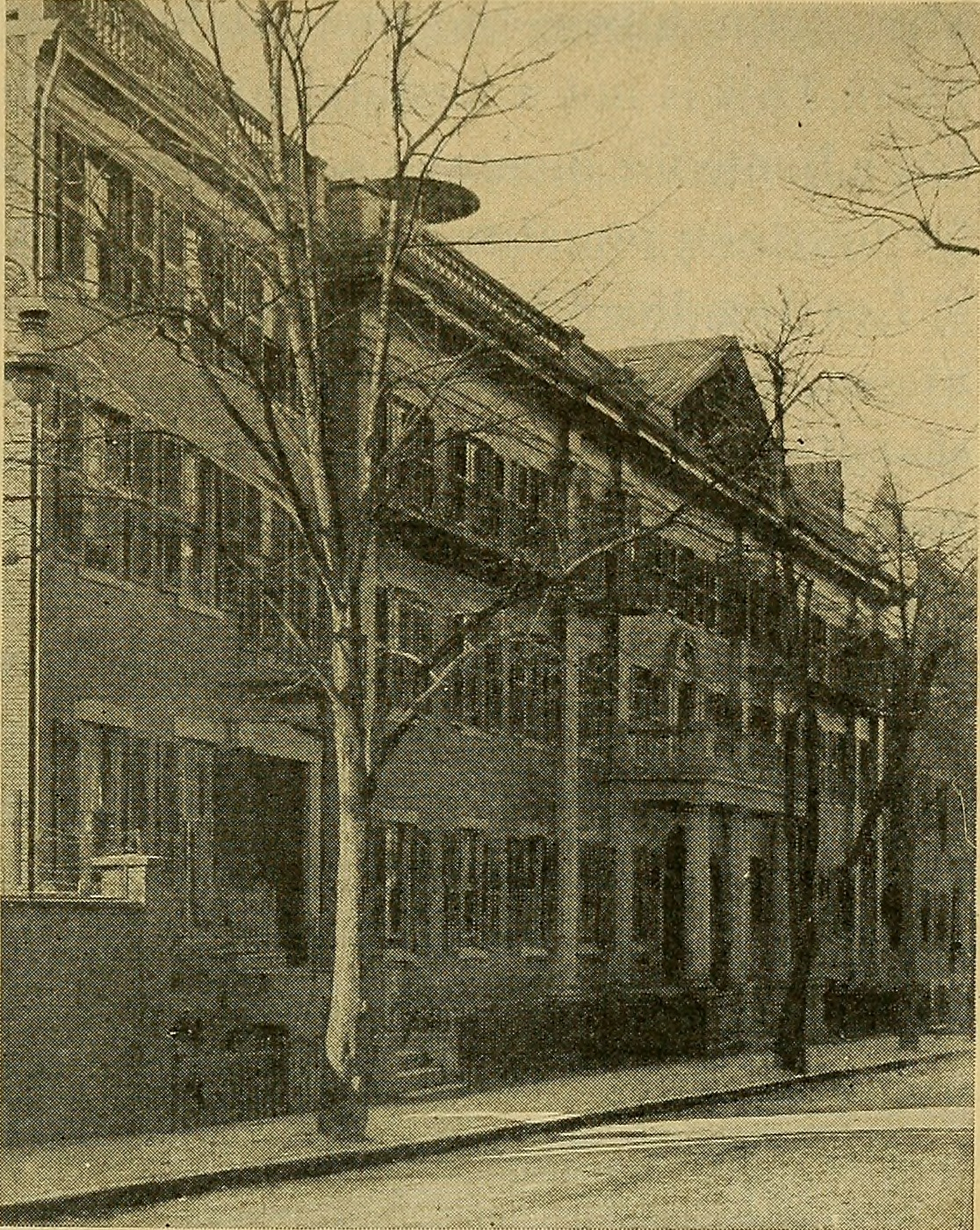
Photograph of the Boston Lying-In Hospital in the United States

=== 19th century ===
During the 19th century, most women globally gave birth at home, where their friends, family, and hired midwives cared for postpartum mothers and newborns. As such, 97% of births in 1892 were given at home in Sweden. In 1832, the Boston Lying-In Hospital in the United States was built as one of the first hospitals where women could give birth. The Progressive Era during the late 19th century in the United States led to increasingly favourable views of hospitals as a place of birth.

=== 1940s – 1960s ===
Hospitalisation for childbirth was normalised during the 1940s due to the impacts of World War II (WWII). The Emergency Maternal and Infant Care program initiated by the United States government in 1944 subsidised postpartum care for wives of men in the military. This led to the increased accessibility and popularity of giving birth at hospitals. By 1945, 78.8% of American women gave birth at hospitals. During WWII, financial support such as the Emergency Maternal and Infant Care program in the United States and increases in birth rate led to shortages of staff and maternity beds in hospitals. These shortages forced hospitals to discharge mothers after a short postpartum period of 24 hours. Before the 1940s, average hospital stay was around 10 to 14 days for vaginal delivery but the effects of WWII led to the decrease in hospital days to around three to five days.

=== 1970s – 1990s ===
During the 1970s, 1980s and 1990s, the length of postnatal hospital stay had steadily decreased in western countries such as the United States, Australia, United Kingdom and Sweden due to improved infrastructure and scientific advancements. The increasing trend of short postnatal hospital stays, often referred to as drive-through deliveries, led to the enactment of early postnatal discharge laws at the state and federal level in the United States between 1995 and 1998. 32 states passed early postnatal discharge laws which typically included the prohibition of limiting insurance plan coverage of less than 48 hours for vaginal delivery and 96 hours for cesarean delivery. As a result, states that had enacted early postnatal discharge laws saw a rapid increase in the length of postnatal hospital stay than states that later enacted these laws or states that had no law at all.

=== 2000s – present ===
Since the 2000s, there has been a further international trend of decreasing length of postnatal hospital stay due to cost-saving ability, availability of physical infrastructure such as fewer hospital beds, and a movement away from medical intervention of childbirth. Western countries such as Australia indicate that 20% of mothers were discharged less than two days postpartum in 2013, compared with 11% in 2003, showing a decreasing trend of postnatal hospital stays. Similarly, postnatal hospital stays have declined to 2.3 days in Sweden, 2.1 days in the Netherlands, and 2.0 days in the United States, Ireland, and New Zealand in 2010.

== Health effects ==
The effects of early postnatal hospital discharge on mothers and newborns have been studied since the early 1960s when the first report on a randomized controlled trial of early postnatal hospital discharge was published by Hellman and Palmer in 1962. Since then, there have been controversies on the safety of mothers and newborns regarding early postnatal discharge, in which studies have concluded adverse effects, while others suggest no significant effects and positive effects. These divergent conclusions have been suggested to result from varying definitions of what constitutes early postnatal hospital discharge, differences in methodologies, and clinical heterogeneity of interventions and programs.

=== Mothers ===
==== Breastfeeding ====
Mothers participating in early discharge programs, which include home-based follow-up care, have been found to have higher rates of breastfeeding at three months postpartum as well as exclusive breastfeeding compared to later-discharged mothers. Additionally, it has been found that mothers were significantly more satisfied with initiation of breastfeeding when they were discharged early, compared to mothers discharged later.

In contrast, it has been suggested that mothers who were discharged early felt reduced positive emotions towards breastfeeding compared to mothers who were not discharged early postpartum. The length of postnatal hospital discharge has also been found to be a predictor of breastfeeding cessation, in which mothers discharged early were more likely to cease breastfeeding compared to mothers who were discharged at a conventional duration.

No association between the duration of breastfeeding initiation and the length of hospital stay postpartum has been found. In addition, it has also been suggested that the length of postnatal hospital stay does not influence breastfeeding rates and duration, in which mothers who were discharged early were equally likely to breastfeed their newborns at a similar rate as the mothers who were discharged later.

==== Depression ====
Early postnatal hospital discharge may influence depression in mothers. Depression amongst mothers who were discharged within 48 hours of giving birth were found to be more likely at five to six months postpartum compared to mothers who were discharged after five days.

In contrast, findings have also suggested that mothers' depression and anxiety are not influenced by early postnatal hospital discharge. It has been found that depression and anxiety measured by the hospital anxiety and depression scale showed no differences between mothers who were discharged early and mothers who were discharged later. This was also found to be the case for mothers within the first six weeks after birth, in which the proportion of depressed moods reported did not differ between mothers who were discharged early and mothers who were discharged later.

=== Newborns ===
==== Morbidity ====
Although conclusions on the effects of early postnatal hospital discharge on morbidity of newborns remain unclear, it has been suggested that newborns discharged within 24 hours of birth are more likely to require readmission by one month compared to newborns discharged after 24 hours. The main reason for newborn readmission was jaundice, which occurred at a higher rate than newborns discharged later. be re-hospitalised for jaundice. It has also been suggested that there are higher rates of dehydration in early discharged newborns compared to newborns discharged later.

In contrast, a systematic literature review has found no significant differences in complication rates, type, and occurrence of newborn morbidities between newborns who were discharged early and those who were discharged later on. Even after three weeks, no differences in complication rates were found between newborns who were discharged early and newborns who stayed at the hospital for a conventional duration.

== Guidelines and policies ==
=== Canada ===
The Healthy Babies Healthy Children program, initiated by the Ontario Ministry of Health and Long-Term Care, includes a policy for hospitals to provide mothers with the option of staying at the hospital postpartum for up to 60 hours. The policy was put in place in 1999, supported by the provision of government funds as a part of the Healthy Babies Healthy Children Postpartum Enhancement, which aims to encourage hospital care for all mothers and newborns. This policy of guaranteed optional 60 hours postnatal hospital stay was implemented due to a case in which a newborn died after being discharged from hospital early, as well as pronouncements made by the Canadian Paediatric Society.

The Canadian Paediatric Society provides a statement which aims to guide the facilitation of postnatal hospital discharge. This position statement offers discharge readiness checklists for the newborn and mother, such as the need for a physical examination of the newborn during the first 24 to 72 hours after birth before they are discharged.

=== United States ===
In the United States, the Newborns' and Mothers' Health Protection Act of 1996 requires health insurance providers and health plans to provide benefits for hospital stays related to childbirth of less than 48 hours for vaginal delivery and 96 hours for cesarean delivery. Early discharge is permitted as an exception if both the insurance or health plan provider and mother agree.

The American Academy of Pediatrics (AAP) provides 17 guidelines and recommendations for early postnatal hospital discharge of healthy infants. AAP suggests that these 17 criteria should be met before the discharge of an infant following an uncomplicated pregnancy and delivery.

=== United Kingdom ===
The Heart of England NHS Foundation Trust (HEFT) offers guidelines for early postnatal discharge for obstetric and midwifery staff within HEFT. HEFT requires that the minimum time for infant discharge following delivery is two hours, with criteria involving the need for normal labor and no adverse medical or obstetric history.

One study done by John Bowers and Helen Cheyne in the U.K. investigated whether reducing the length of the patients' stay could be possible and safe. In the U.K. having a baby is the number one reason for hospital visits, with 800,000 babies being born annually. These numbers are costing the NHS (National Health Service) 2.5 billion pounds per year. They considered making the stay shorter due to the number of women who use midwives and have access to postnatal care, without hospital involvement. Their study found that while they could reduce the postnatal stay without jeopardizing the patients, it would not save the hospitals enough money to make the reduction worthwhile.

A UK study based on interviews with 40 pregnant women highlighted a fear of having to leave the hospital too early or having to stay too long. According to their feedback, the ideal situation would be more control over the length of stay and making a joint decision with staff.

== Statistics ==
Campbell, Cegolon, Macleod, and Benova in 2016 investigated the average duration of hospital stay after facility births in 92 countries. Data was gathered using existing database and health surveys from the Organisation for Economic Co-operation and Development (OECD), Demographic and Health Surveys (DHS), Multiple Indicator Cluster Surveys (MICS) and the US Centers for Disease Control and Prevention Reproductive Health Survey (CDC-RHS). The average length of postnatal hospital stay for vaginal delivery ranged from 0.5 days (Egypt) to 6.2 days (Ukraine) in 71 countries whereas cesarean delivery ranged from 2.5 to 9.3 days in 30 countries.

== Controversy ==
In a study done by Kay M. Tomashek et al., they researched the rate of infant morbidity in late preterm and term infants and their discharge time. Of the 1004 late preterm and 24,320 term infants in our study, 4.3% and 2.7% of infants, respectively, were either readmitted or had an observational stay. Late preterm infants were 1.5 times more likely to require hospital-related care and 1.8 times more likely to be readmitted than term infants. Among infants who were breastfed, late preterm infants were 1.8 times more likely than term infants to require hospital-related care and 2.2 times more likely to be readmitted. Jaundice and infection accounted for the majority of readmissions. Their findings suggest that late preterm infants discharged early experience significantly more neonatal morbidity than term infants discharged early; however, this may be true only for breastfed infants.

== Preparedness ==
A study done by Gabriella Malagon-Maldonado et al., researched the antepartum, intrapartum, and postpartum predictors of discharge readiness, including nursing educational practices that are predictive of postpartum mothers' perceptions of readiness for hospital discharge. Their results found that mothers with three or more children, delivery mode, bottle-feeding, the delivery of education, and the difference between educational content received and needed, were significant predictors that accounted for 42% of the variance in readiness for hospital discharge. Nurses' skill in teaching and educational content received were significant predictors even with parity, feeding, and delivery mode in the model.
