= National Association for Home Care & Hospice =

- Founded at: Washington D.C.
- Location: United States
- Key people: Bill Dombi (President)

The National Association for Home Care & Hospice is an association for providers of hospice care in the United States. It represents 33,000 home care and hospice organizations and is based in Washington DC. Bill Dombi is the president.

The organization claims that most Medicare Advantage insurers do not appreciate the value of home-based care. It supports the Homecare for Seniors Act introduced in the House of Representatives in 2018. This would allow seniors to use funds from health savings accounts for qualified homecare services.

Recruiting qualified personnel to work in the homes of patients is very high on the concerns of its members. From 2000 to 2015, home health providers saw a 115% increase in employment. 2015 was the first year that more money was spent on home care in the USA than nursing home care.

It produced a report in 2018 on problems of data sharing and interoperability in the hospice sector. Members work with an average of 396 referral sources, many using different communications systems. 24% of referrals are made by phone and 27% by fax. Hospices were said to face project costs of up to $15,000 per integration project, not including yearly maintenance fees.
