= The Homecare Association =

British trade association

The Homecare Association (formerly the UKHCA) is the trade organization for providers of home care in the United Kingdom. It was established in 1989.

It provides various benefits for its members, such as information and advice, a helpline, business resources, and a magazine, as well as access to training, events and other home care products and services.

Homecare Association acts as a lobbying organisation for the home care sector, seeking to raise the profile of home care and influence policy. It works with government, councils, the NHS, regulators, media outlets, and the public to represent home care and members' interests.
