= Gustavo Rivera =

Gustavo Rivera is the name of:

- Gustavo Rivera Baeza (1894–1963), Chilean academic and Liberal politician
- Gustavo Rivera (politician) (born 1975), American politician
- Gustavo Rivera (soccer) (born 1993), Puerto Rican soccer player

== See also ==
- Rivera (disambiguation)
