= National Aboriginal Hockey Championships =

Indigenous youth hockey tournament in Canada

National Aboriginal Hockey Championships (NAHC) is an ice hockey championship established in Canada by the Aboriginal Sport Circle.

The annual tournament provides an opportunity for U15 (Bantam) and U18-aged Indigenous youth across Canada to compete for the NAHC title. Teams are selected and representative of each province and territory, with attracts participation from First Nations, Inuit, and Metis peoples.

The NAHC also serves as a focal point for grassroots and regional Indigenous hockey development. Both girls' and boys' teams are eligible to compete in this competition. The location of the tournament varies every year and hosting rights are determined by a bidding policy put in place by the Aboriginal Sport Circle (ASC).

== History ==
Founded in 2002, the National Aboriginal Hockey Championships was established by the Aboriginal Sport Circle and sanctioned by Hockey Canada.

In 2002 and again in 2003, the championship was held in Akwesasne/Cornwall, Ontario. The following year in 2004, the tournament was held in Prince George, British Columbia. Next, the games were held in Miramichi, New Brunswick in 2005. The following year 2006, they took place in Kahnawake, Quebec. Thereafter in 2007, the championship was played in Prince Albert, Saskatchewan. The following year 2008 the tournament was played in Sault Ste Marie, Ontario. The following year in 2009 the tournament was played in Winnipeg, Manitoba. In 2010 the Tournament was played in Ottawa, Ontario. The next two years – 2011 and 2012 were played in Saskatoon, Saskatchewan. The following two years – 2013 and 2014 the tournament was played in Kahnawake, Canada again. In 2015 the championship was held in Halifax, Nova Scotia. Following in 2016 the championship was held in Mississauga, Ontario, then in Cowichan, British Columbia in 2017, Membertou, Nova Scotia in 2018, and 2019 in Whitehorse, Yukon. The 2020 and 2021 championships were cancelled due to the COVID-19 pandemic. In 2022, the championships returned to Membertou, Nova Scotia and then Winnipeg, Manitoba in 2023. At the conclusion of the 2023 NAHC in Winnipeg, the Aboriginal Sports Circle (ASC) announced the championships would be held in Alberta for the first time in history, with Grande Prairie named the host city.

The 2025 Championships were held in Kamloops, BC, the 3rd time that British Columbia would be hosting. Manitoba swept the gold medals, with Alberta winning the male silver and BC the female silver. The bronze medals both went to Saskatchewan. Regina would be the host city for the 2026 championships, and Manitoba would go on to maintain their gold streak, sweeping both divisions for a second year in a row. Alberta would once again finish just short, winning both silvers, with BC claiming female bronze and Ontario the male bronze.

Overall, Ontario has won the most female division medals, with 24, and Manitoba leads the male division with 16 total.

=== Female Division Results ===
Since 2002 within the Female Division, the data collected from past championship results shows that Ontario has won the most gold medals and the most medals overall in the Female Division. The total number of medals attained by each Province/Territory is recorded in Table 3.1.

==== Table 1. Female Division: Medal Results (Aboriginal Sport Circle, n.d.) ====
Year	Gold (first-place finish)	Silver (second-place finish)	Bronze (third-place finish)	Host city
2002	Ontario South	Eastern Door and the North	Saskatchewan	Akwesasne/Cornwall, Ontario
2003	Ontario South	Eastern Door and the North	Ontario North	Akwesasne/Cornwall
2004	Ontario South	Eastern Door and the North	Ontario North	Prince George, BC
2005	Eastern Door and the North	Ontario South	Saskatchewan	Miramichi, NB
2006	Ontario South	Ontario North	Manitoba	Kahnawake, PQ
2007	Ontario South	Ontario North	Saskatchewan	Prince Albert, SK
2008	Ontario South	Ontario North	British Columbia	Sault Ste Marie ON
2009	Manitoba	Ontario South	Saskatchewan	Winnipeg, MB
2010	Manitoba	Ontario North	Ontario South	Ottawa, ON
2011	Saskatchewan	Eastern Door and the North	Alberta	Saskatoon, SK
2012	Eastern Door and the North	Saskatchewan	Ontario	Saskatoon, SK
2013	Eastern Door and the North	Saskatchewan	Manitoba	Kahnawake, PQ
2014	Saskatchewan	Ontario	Eastern Door and the North	Kahnawake, PQ
2015	Saskatchewan	Ontario	Manitoba	Halifax, Nova Scotia, NS
2016	Saskatchewan	Ontario	Manitoba	Mississauga, ON
2017	Manitoba	Saskatchewan	British Columbia	Cowichan, BC
2018	Manitoba	Ontario South	Saskatchewan	Membertou, NS
2019	Saskatchewan	Manitoba	Ontario	Whitehorse, YT
2020				Cancelled due to COVID-19 Pandemic.
2021				Cancelled due to COVID-19 Pandemic.
2022	Manitoba	Ontario	British Columbia	Membertou, NS
2023	Ontario	Manitoba	Alberta	Winnipeg, MB
2024	Ontario	Alberta	British Columbia & Manitoba (Game Cancelled)	Grande Prairie, AB
2025	Manitoba	British Columbia	Saskatchewan	Kamloops, BC
2026	Manitoba	Alberta	British Columbia	Regina, SK

=== Male Division Results ===
Since 2002 within the Male Division, the data collected from past championship results shows that Saskatchewan has won the most gold medals, while Manitoba has won the most medals overall in the Male Division. The total number of medals attained by each Province/Territory is recorded in Table 3.2.

==== Table 2. Male Division: Medal Results (Aboriginal Sport Circle, n.d.) ====
Year	Gold (first-place finish)	Silver (second-place finish)	Bronze (third-place finish)	Host city
2002	Manitoba	Eastern Door and the North	Ontario North	Akwesasne/Cornwall (first)
2003	Saskatchewan	Manitoba	Eastern Door and the North	Akwesasne/Cornwall
2004	Ontario North	Ontario South	Eastern Door and the North	Prince George, BC
2005	Ontario North	Atlantic	Manitoba	Miramichi, NB
2006	Saskatchewan	Ontario South	Manitoba	Kahnawake, PQ
2007	Eastern Door and the North	Manitoba	Saskatchewan	Prince Albert, SK
2008	Saskatchewan	Eastern Door and the North	Alberta	Sault Ste Marie, ON
2009	Saskatchewan	Eastern Door and the North	Manitoba	Winnipeg, MB
2010	Saskatchewan	Manitoba	Eastern Door and the North	Ottawa, ON
2011	Saskatchewan	Eastern Door and the North	Ontario	Saskatoon, SK
2012	Eastern Door and the North	Alberta	Manitoba	Saskatoon, SK
2013	British Columbia	Alberta	Ontario	Kahnawake, PQ
2014	Saskatchewan	British Columbia	Alberta	Kahnawake, PQ
2015	Saskatchewan	Alberta	British Columbia	Halifax, NS
2016	British Columbia	Team North	Manitoba	Mississauga, ON
2017	Manitoba	Ontario	British Columbia	Cowichan, BC
2018	British Columbia	Saskatchewan	Manitoba	Membertou, NS
2019	Manitoba	Saskatchewan	British Columbia	Whitehorse, YT
2020				Cancelled due to COVID-19 Pandemic.
2021				Cancelled due to COVID-19 Pandemic.
2022	Ontario	Saskatchewan	British Columbia	Membertou, NS
2023	Manitoba	Ontario	British Columbia	Winnipeg, MB
2024	Ontario	Saskatchewan	British Columbia & Manitoba (Game cancelled)	Grande Prairie, AB
2025	Manitoba	Alberta	Saskatchewan	Kamloops, BC
2026	Manitoba	Alberta	Saskatchewan	Regina, SK

==== Table 3.1. Total Medal Count: Female Division ====
Province/Territory	Gold	Silver	Bronze	Total
Atlantic	0	0	0	0
Alberta	0	2	2	4
British Columbia	0	1	5	6
Eastern Door and the North	3	4	1	8
Manitoba	7	2	5	14
Saskatchewan	5	3	6	14
Ontario	8	11	5	24

==== Table 3.2. Total Medal Count: Male Division ====
Province/Territory	Gold	Silver	Bronze	Total
Atlantic	0	1	0	1
North	0	1	0	1
Alberta	0	5	2	7
British Columbia	3	1	6	10
Eastern Door and the North	2	4	3	9
Ontario	4	4	3	11
Saskatchewan	8	4	3	15
Manitoba	6	3	7	16

== Key activities and awards ==
Indigenous youth athletes between the ages of 13 years and 18 years try out for their provincial/territorial teams annually. Those individuals who make the team then participate in the annual NAHC as a member of their provincial/territorial team. Each team in the competition is competing against other provinces and territories from across Canada.

First, second, and third place finalists are all recognized in this tournament. Both the boys’ and girls’ division first place teams receive gold medals; the teams who place second in each division receive silver medals, while the teams who place third receive bronze medals. The gold medalist in each division is also presented with the Turtle Island Cup, a wooden carved trophy handcrafted by artist Carey Newman.

Individually, the tournament recognizes players in both the female and male division through awards. Most Valuable Goaltender, Most Valuable Forward, Most Valuable Defence, and Most Sportsmanlike Player awards are all handed out at the conclusion of the tournament. In addition, the Most Sportsmanlike Team is also recognized in each division as determined by the Aboriginal Sports Circle committee.

== Organizers ==
Hosting rights of this event is a result of a successful bidding process performed by provincial/territorial hockey associations. To be eligible, the bid must be approved by its Provincial/Territorial Aboriginal Sport Body (P/TASB). Only one community can bid per Province/Territory. Once selected, the hosting site works with the Aboriginal Sport Circle to coordinate the annual championship. Together they often recruit local volunteers to assist with preparation and execution of the event. Moreover, sponsors aid by providing funding and in-kind contributions for each annual event.

As a sanctioned Hockey Canada event, the NAHC are staged annually during the first two weeks in May. This ensures that the NAHC do not conflict with any of the Provincial/Territorial Bantam and Midget Hockey Championships.

== Cultural practices ==
The NAHC is a week-long event with opening ceremonies conducted on the first day and closing awards ceremonies conducted following the final Gold Medal Game. The championship begins with an opening ceremony that includes Indigenous cultural practices. Indigenous attire, music and dance are included in this ceremonial moment that ignites the beginning of the Championship. Additionally, the ceremony often includes an introduction of members of the host committee, special speakers, and VIP guests. All teams participating in the Championship are present during the opening ceremony.

== Notable alumni ==
=== Players ===
Male Division
Name	Team	Descent	Description
Jordin Tootoo	North	Inuk	Former NHL Player
Micheal Ferland	Manitoba	Cree	Former NHL Player
Brady Keeper	Manitoba	Cree	Former NHL Player
Zach Whitecloud	Manitoba	Dakota	NHL Player
Brandon Montour	Ontario	Mohawk	NHL Player
Ethan Bear	Saskatchewan	Cree	NHL Player
Conner Roulette	Manitoba	Cree/Ojibway	NHL Draft Pick

Female Division
Name	Team	Descent	Description
Brigette Lacquette	Manitoba	Cote First Nation	Canadian National Team, Olympian
Jocelyne Larocque	Manitoba	Metis	Canadian National Team, Olympian
Jamie Lee Rattray	Ontario	Metis	Canadian National Team, Olympian

=== Coaches ===
Name	Team	Descent	Description
Ted Nolan	Ontario	Ojibwe	Former NHL Head Coach
Micheal Ferland	Manitoba	Cree	Former NHL Player
Dwayne Roloson	British Columbia	Non-Indigenous	Former NHL Goaltender, Goalie Coach
Robert (Bobby) Vermette	British Columbia	Metis	Former NHL Amateur Scout
