= Long-term acute care facility =

Type of health care facility

In the United States, a long-term acute care hospital (LTACH), also known as a long-term care hospital (LTCH), is a hospital specializing in treating patients requiring extended hospitalization. Hospitals specializing in long-term care have existed for decades in the form of sanatoriums for patients with tuberculosis and other chronic diseases. The modern hospital known as an LTACH came into existence as a result of the Medicare, Medicaid, and SCHIP Balanced Budget Refinement Act of 1999. The Act defines an LTACH as “a hospital which has an average inpatient length of stay (as determined by the Secretary of Health and Human Services (the Secretary)) of greater than 25 days.” Traditionally, LTACHs provide care for patients receiving prolonged mechanical ventilation.

LTACHs have a diverse set of characteristics which influence the ways in which they operate. Physically, LTACHs exist in two models, hospital within hospital or free-standing. Hospital within hospital LTACHs are physically located inside of a short term acute care hospital and often look similar to a separated unit of the hospital. Free-standing LTACHs are LTACHs in separate buildings from short term acute care hospitals. LTACHs can be non-profit or for profit. They also can be associated with a health care system, post-acute care system, or a system of LTACHs.

== Payment ==
The payment system for the services provided by LTACHs is complex. Medicare reimburses for LTACH services through the Prospective Payment System. Payments are based on an average patient length of stay in the LTACH of 25 days. LTACHs receive an adjusted DRG (Diagnosis-Related Group) payment for patients. Generally, LTACHs have higher reimbursement rates and higher operating margins than traditional short-stay hospitals, which in part reflects the higher cost of care for patients with complex care needs.

== LTACH quality reporting ==
The Affordable Care Act requires LTACHs to report several quality measures as set by CMS. New quality measures go into effect each year on October 1, the beginning of the federal fiscal year. A list of quality measures and the year of implementation can be found [here]. If LTACHs do not report the quality data, they receive a 2 percent reduction in their CMS payment.

== Criticisms ==
Patients needing extended care and their families are often told LTACHs provide superior care, but the evidence is limited. There is some criticism surrounding the frequency with which patients develop serious infections in LTACHs, which can occur three times as much as in conventional hospitals. "Long-term care hospitals, which have grown rapidly in the last 25 years (1996-2021?), are cited as having almost twice the number of Medicare violations as standard hospitals, and also have higher incidents of bedsores and infections." Other criticisms include the motivation for transferring patients to LTACHs and the timing surrounding patient discharge from LTACHs, which appear in part to be based on financial considerations stemming from the complex LTACH payment regulations in the United States.
