= LifePoint Health =

U.S. healthcare company

- Type: Private
- Traded as: Nasdaq: LPNT
- Industry: Health - Hospitals
- Founded: 1999; 27 years ago
- Headquarters: Brentwood, Tennessee, U.S.
- Key people: David M. Dill (president and CEO); John P. Bumpus (EVP, administration); Michael S. Coggin (EVP, CFO); Victor E. Giovanetti, FACHE (EVP, hospital operations); Rob Jay (EVP, integrated operations); Jennifer Peters (EVP and general counsel); Russ Bailey (President of Lifepoint Rehabilitation and Lifepoint Behavioral Health)
- Services: Healthcare services
- Revenue: US$8.8 billion
- Owner: Apollo Global Management
- Number of employees: 60,000 (2018)
- Website: www.lifepointhealth.net

LifePoint Health is an American company that provides healthcare services in growing regions, rural communities and small towns. It was established in 1999 and is headquartered in Brentwood, Tennessee. As of November 16, 2018, it operated 89 hospital campuses in 30 states with more than $6 billion in revenues. In 2011, the company was included in the Hospital Engagement Network by the U.S. Department of Health and Human Services, the only private organization in the country to be included.

== History ==
In January 2011, the company formed a joint venture with Duke University Health System. In 2005, Historic LifePoint Hospitals, Inc. merged with Province Healthcare Company to form the new public company, LifePoint Hospitals, Inc.

In May 2011, DLP Healthcare, LLC, a joint venture of Duke University Health System and LifePoint Hospitals completed the acquisition of MedCath Partners, LLC.

In June 2013, LifePoint Health completed the acquisition of the Bell Hospital.

In December 2013, Portage Health and LifePoint Health reached a joint venture agreement to share ownership and operation of Portage Health, with about $40 million to fund a charitable foundation.

In February 2014, LifePoint Health opened its new hospital support center in Brentwood.

In 2015, LifePoint Hospitals Inc. changed its name to LifePoint Health.

In 2018, LifePoint was acquired by private equity firm Apollo Global Management and merged with RCCH Healthcare Partners, which had formed from a merger a few years prior between Capella Health and RegionalCare Hospital Partners.

In 2021, LifePoint Health acquired Kindred Health. LifePoint Health spun off part of the company as ScionHealth in December 2021. After the acquisition, LifePoint now operates hospitals in 25 states, including the former Kindred rehabilitation and behavioral health businesses. ScionHealth will consist of 79 hospital campuses in 25 states, including Kindred’s 61 long-term acute care hospitals and 18 of LifePoint’s community hospitals and associated health systems.

In December 2023, the Senate Budget Committee launched an investigation into the effects of private equity ownership on hospitals that specifically mentioned Apollo's ownership of Lifepoint regarding high debt levels, cuts to services, layoffs, poor quality ratings, and regulatory investigations.

== Products and services ==
The services provided by the company's hospitals include inpatient services, such as general surgery, emergency room care, radiology, oncology, and pediatric services, as well as outpatient services, such as same-day surgery, X-ray and respiratory therapy.

== Awards ==
In November 2013, fifteen LifePoint Health hospitals were considered Top Performers in Key Quality Measures by The Joint Commission. Eleven of LifePoint's hospitals were Top Performers in 2012. On the list of "100 Best Places to Work in Healthcare" by Modern Healthcare, Jackson Purchase Medical Center was ranked 55th in 2010 and 70th in 2009
