= Home care =

Health care and/or supportive care provided in a patient's home

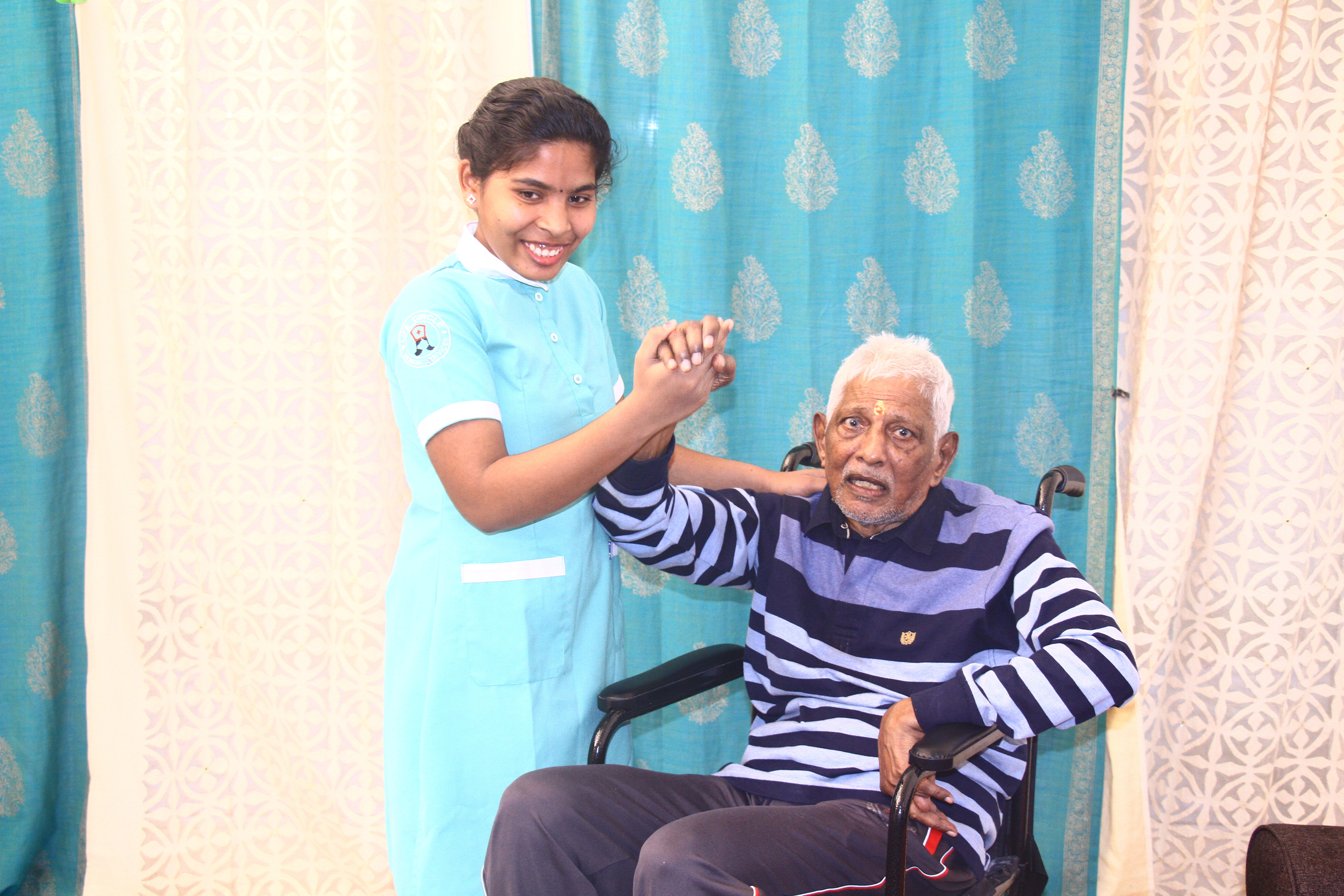
A caregiver and her patient

Homecare (also known as home care, in-home care, care at home, domiciliary care, personal care, community care, or social care) is health care or supportive care provided in the home of the individual where the patient or client is living, generally focusing on paramedical aid by professional caregivers, assistance with daily living for ill, disabled or elderly people, or a combination thereof. Depending on legislation, a wide range of other services can also be included in homecare.

Homecare can be organised by national or local governments, volunteer organisations, or private providers.

== Purpose ==
Homecare is an alternative to institutional care such as that provided in group accommodations and nursing home. Research shows that clients receiving home health care may incur lower costs, receive equal to better care, and have increased satisfaction in contrast to other settings.

== Services included ==
The services included vary considerably between jurisdictions, volunteer organizations, and markets. Some examples of homecare services are:

- assistance with activities of daily living (ADLs), such as bathing, toileting, food preparation, feeding, incontinence care, laundry, and changing bed linens,
- paramedical aid and qualified nursing care, such as injections, management of pressure sores, catheter and stoma care, carrying out physician orders, tracking vital signs, drawing blood, and documentation of health status,
- palliative and end-of-life care,
- communication between patient, family and physician,
- mobility support, including short walks, conveyance to and from health institutions, or adapted public transportation services,
- counselling, including behaviour management, psychological support and reminding devices, and
- providing or managing mechanical and manual aids.

=== India ===
The Goa-based non-profit organisation, the Indian Students Educational Aid Foundation (ISEAF) has a home nursing bureau, that is located at the Holy Cross Indo-German Techno Centre, in Marna. It launched a mobile nursing service in March 2018 to serve homebound patients. It offered services such as the dressing of wounds, bladder wash, IV medication, home dialysis, nebulization, enema and the like.

== Caregivers ==
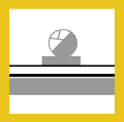
A caregiver's badge (New Zealand)

Caregivers can range from qualified nurses and advanced medical staff to nursing auxiliaries. Some caregivers travel to multiple homes per day and provide short visits to multiple patients, while others may stay with one patient for a certain amount of time per day.

== See also ==
- Aging in place
- Assisted living
- Community mental health service
- Home care in the United Kingdom
- Home care in the United States
- Healthcare in India
- Paratransit
