= African Americans =

Ethnic and cultural group in the United States

- Proportion of Black Americans in U.S. counties, as of the 2020 U.S. census

Total population
- Alone (one race): ▲41,104,200 ▼12.40% of the total U.S. population In combination (mixed race): ▲5,832,533 ▲1.76% of the total U.S. population Alone or in combination: ▲46,936,733 ▲14.16% of the total U.S. population

Regions with significant populations
- Predominantly the Southern United States and American urban centers, including
- Texas: 3,552,997
- Georgia: 3,320,513
- Florida: 3,246,381
- New York: 2,986,172
- California: 2,237,044

Languages
- American English (incl. African-American English and African-American Vernacular English), Gullah, Louisiana Creole

Religion
- Majority: Christianity (73%) (Note: Predominantly Protestantism (65%), including the African-American Church, Evangelicalism and Mainline Protestantism. Other Christian denominations include Catholicism (4%), Jehovah's Witnesses and Church of Jesus Christ of Latter-day Saints (combined 4%).); Other: Irreligion (22%); Non-Christian (4%); See: Religion of Black Americans

African Americans or Black Americans, also formerly called Afro-Americans, are Americans who have ancestry from "any of the Black racial groups of Africa", as defined by the United States census. African Americans constitute the third-largest racial and ethnic group in the U.S., following White Americans and Hispanic and Latino Americans. The term "African American" generally denotes descendants of Africans enslaved in the United States. According to annual estimates from the U.S. Census Bureau, as of July 1, 2024, the overall Black population was estimated at 42,951,595, representing approximately 12.63% of the total U.S. population.

African-American history began in the 16th century, when mainly West African and Central African slave traders sold African artisans, farmers, and warriors to European slave traders, who transported them across the Atlantic to the Western Hemisphere. They were sold as slaves to European colonists and put to work on plantations, particularly in the southern colonies. A few were able to achieve freedom through manumission or escape, and founded independent communities before and during the American Revolution. After the United States was founded in 1783, most American Black people continued to be enslaved, primarily in the American South, with four million enslaved people only liberated after the Northern victory over the South in the Civil War of 1861 to 1865.

During Reconstruction, African Americans gained citizenship and adult males the right to vote; however, due to widespread belief in White supremacy, they were treated as second-class citizens and soon effectively disenfranchised in the South. These circumstances changed due to participation in the military conflicts of the United States, substantial migration out of the South, the elimination of legal racial segregation, and the civil rights movement, which sought political and social freedom. However, racism against African Americans and racial socioeconomic disparity remain as problems into the 21st century. In the 20th and 21st centuries, immigration has played an increasingly significant role in the African-American community. As of 2022, 10% of the U.S. Black population were immigrants, and 20% were either immigrants or the children of immigrants. While some Black immigrants or their children may also come to identify as African American, the majority of first-generation immigrants do not, preferring to identify with their nation of origin. Most African Americans are of West African and coastal Central African ancestry, with varying amounts of Western European and Native American ancestry (see §Genetics).

African-American culture has had a significant influence on worldwide culture, making numerous contributions to the English language, literature, politics, cuisine, sports, and music. The African-American contribution to popular music is so profound that most American popular music, including gospel, blues, jazz, rock and roll, R&B, soul, funk, disco, hip-hop, and house has its origins either partially or entirely in the African-American community.

== History ==
=== Colonial era ===
Major slave trading regions of Africa, 15th–19th centuries

The vast majority of those who were enslaved and transported in the transatlantic slave trade were people from several Central and West African ethnic groups. They had been captured directly by European slave traders in coastal raids, or captured and sold by West African slave traders or by half-European "merchant princes" to European slave traders, who brought them to the Americas.

The first African slaves in what is now the United States arrived in the early 16th century. Africans were among Juan Ponce de León's 1513 voyage that landed in what would become Spanish Florida, and enslaved Africans arrived around the same time to Spanish Puerto Rico.

Africans also came via Santo Domingo in the Caribbean to the San Miguel de Gualdape colony (most likely located in the Winyah Bay area of present-day South Carolina), founded by Spanish explorer Lucas Vázquez de Ayllón in 1526. The ill-fated colony was almost immediately disrupted by a fight over leadership, during which the slaves revolted and fled the colony to seek refuge among local Native Americans. De Ayllón and many of the colonists died shortly afterward, due to an epidemic and the colony was abandoned. The settlers and the slaves who had not escaped returned to the Island of Hispaniola, whence they had come.

The enslaved explorer Esteban arrived in Florida with the Narváez expedition in 1528, a journey that first landed in Santo Domingo and later traveled into Spanish Texas and the Southwest before ending in Mexico.

The marriage between Luisa de Abrego, a free Black domestic servant from Seville, and Miguel Rodríguez, a White Segovian conquistador in 1565 in St. Augustine (Spanish Florida), is the first known and recorded Christian marriage anywhere in what is now the continental United States.

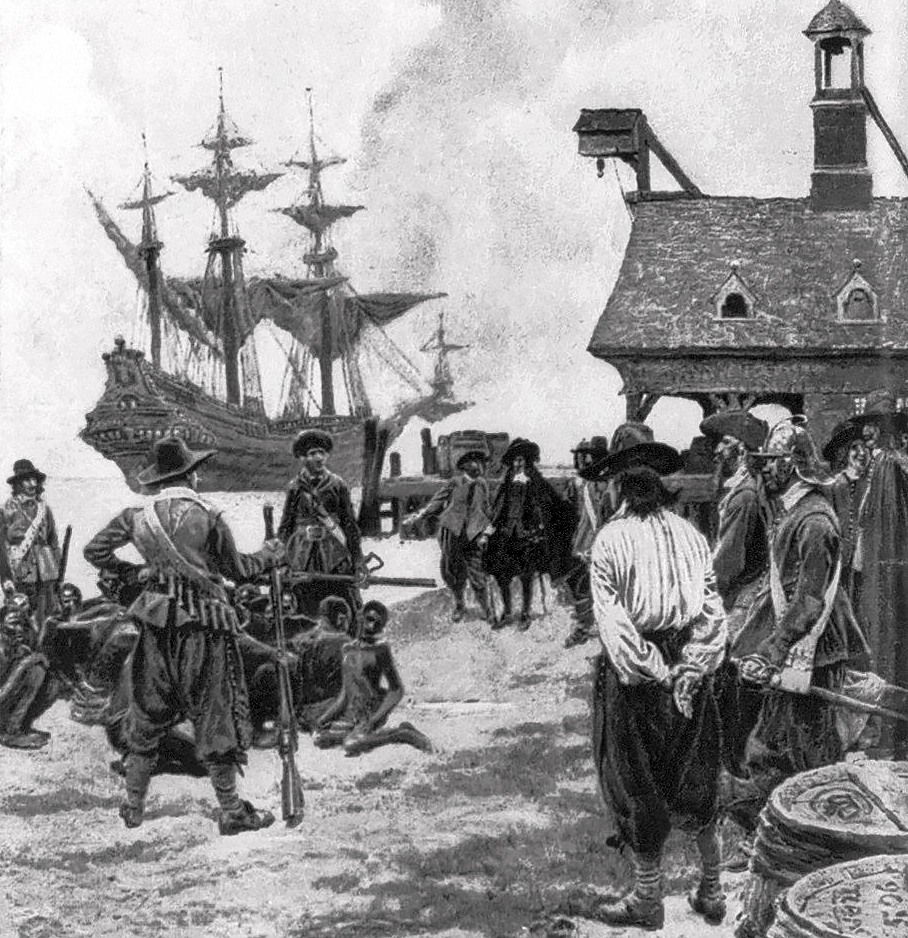
1619 : first Africans in Virginia

The first recorded Africans in English America (including most of the future United States) were "20 and odd negroes" who arrived in Jamestown, Virginia via Cape Comfort in August 1619 as indentured servants. As many Virginian settlers began to die from harsh conditions, more and more Africans were brought to work as laborers.

An indentured servant (who could be White or Black) would work for several years (usually four to seven) without wages. The status of indentured servants in early Virginia and Maryland was similar to slavery. Servants could be bought, sold, or leased, and they could be physically beaten for disobedience or attempting to running away. Unlike slaves, they were freed after their term of service expired or if their freedom was purchased. Their children did not inherit their status, and on their release from contract they received "a year's provision of corn, double apparel, tools necessary", and a small cash payment called "freedom dues". Africans could legally raise crops and cattle to purchase their freedom. They raised families, married other Africans and sometimes intermarried with Native Americans or European settlers.

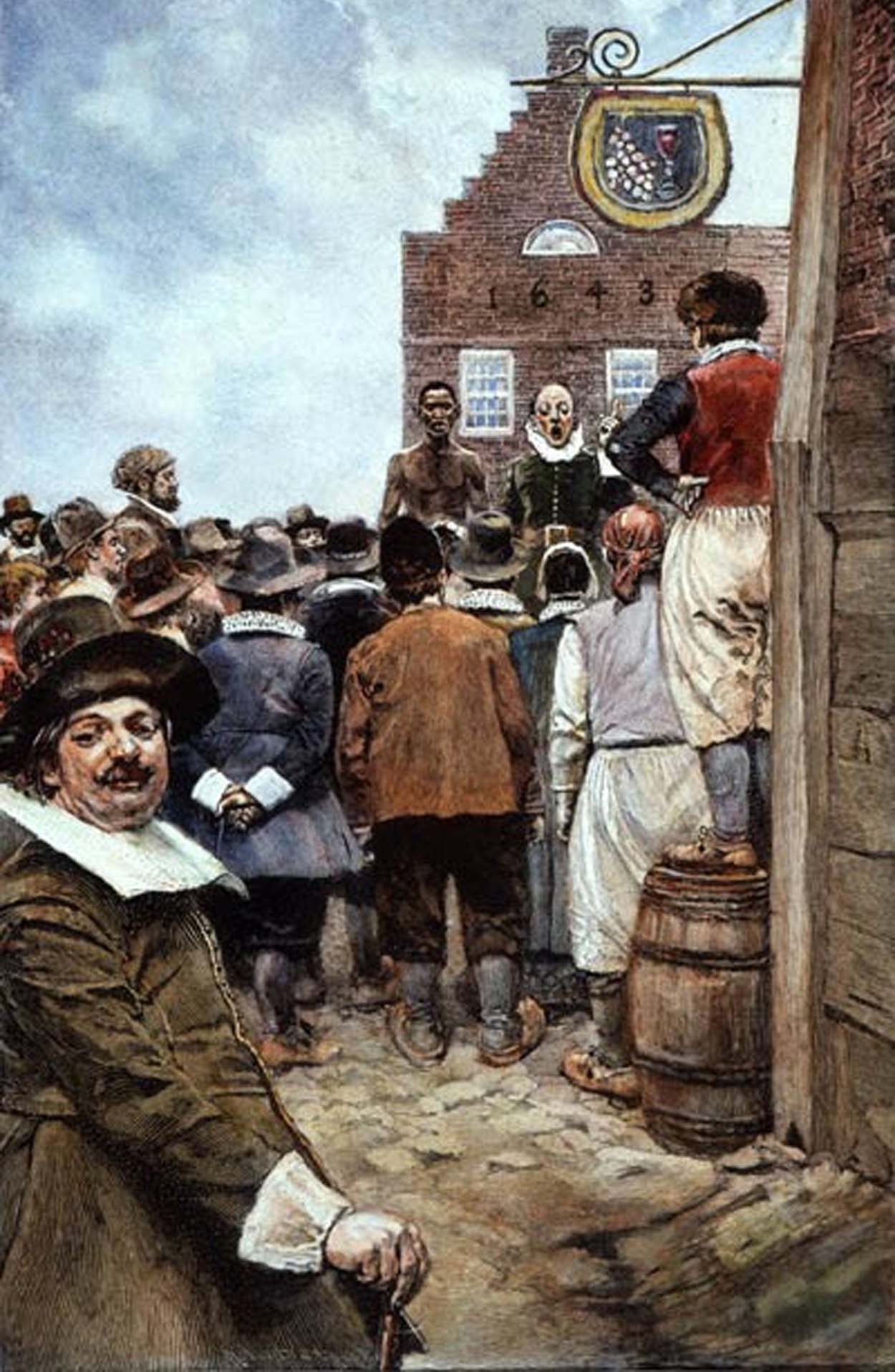
The first slave auction at New Amsterdam in 1655; illustration from 1895 by Howard Pyle

By the 1640s and 1650s, several African families owned farms around Jamestown, and some became wealthy by colonial standards and purchased indentured servants of their own. In 1640, the Virginia General Court recorded the earliest documentation of lifetime slavery when they sentenced John Punch, a Negro, to lifetime servitude under his master Hugh Gwyn, for running away.

In Spanish Florida, some Spanish married or had unions with Pensacola, Creek or African women, both enslaved and free, and their descendants created a mixed-race population of mestizos and mulattos. The Spanish encouraged slaves from the colony of Georgia to come to Florida as a refuge, promising freedom in exchange for conversion to Catholicism. King Charles II issued a royal proclamation freeing all slaves who fled to Spanish Florida and accepted conversion and baptism. Most went to the area around St. Augustine, but escaped slaves also reached Pensacola. St. Augustine had mustered an all-Black militia unit defending Spanish Florida as early as 1683.

Black slaves working on a tobacco plantation in the colony of Virginia, 1759

One of the Dutch African arrivals, Anthony Johnson, would later own one of the first Black "slaves", John Casor, resulting from the court ruling of a civil case.

The popular conception of a race-based slave system did not fully develop until the 18th century. The Dutch West India Company introduced slavery in 1625 with the importation of eleven Black slaves into New Amsterdam (present-day New York City). All the colony's slaves, however, were freed upon its surrender to the English.

Massachusetts was the first English colony to legally recognize slavery in 1641. In 1662, Virginia passed a law that children of enslaved women would take the status of the mother, rather than that of the father, as was the case under common law. This legal principle was called partus sequitur ventrum.

By an act of 1699, Virginia ordered the deportation of all free Blacks, effectively defining all people of African descent who remained in the colony as slaves. In 1670, the colonial assembly passed a law prohibiting free and baptized Blacks (and Native Americans) from purchasing Christians (in this act meaning White Europeans) but allowing them to buy people "of their owne nation".

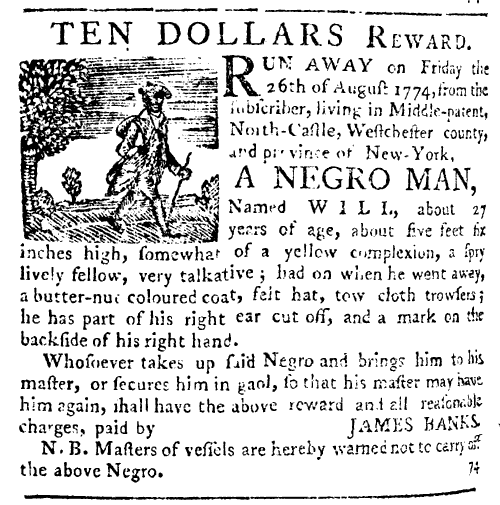
1774 image of a fugitive slave in a New York newspaper, offering a $10 reward (equivalent to $295 in 2025). Slave owners, including George Washington and Thomas Jefferson, placed around 200,000 runaway slave adverts in newspapers across the US before slavery ended in 1865.

In Spanish Louisiana, although there was no movement toward abolition of the African slave trade, Spanish rule introduced a new law called coartación, which allowed slaves to buy their freedom, and that of others. Although some did not have the money to do so, government measures on slavery enabled the existence of many free Blacks. This caused problems to the Spaniards with the French creoles (French who had settled in New France) who had also populated Spanish Louisiana. The French creoles cited that measure as one of the system's worst elements.

First established in South Carolina in 1704, groups of armed White men—slave patrols—were formed to monitor enslaved Black people. Their function was to police slaves, especially fugitives. Slave owners feared that slaves might organize revolts or slave rebellions, so state militias were formed to provide a military command structure and discipline within the slave patrols. These patrols were used to detect, encounter, and crush any organized slave meetings which might lead to revolts or rebellions.

The earliest African American congregations and churches were organized before 1800 in both northern and southern cities following the Great Awakening. By 1775, Africans made up 20% of the population in the American colonies, which made them the second-largest ethnic group after English Americans.

=== From the American Revolution to the Civil War ===
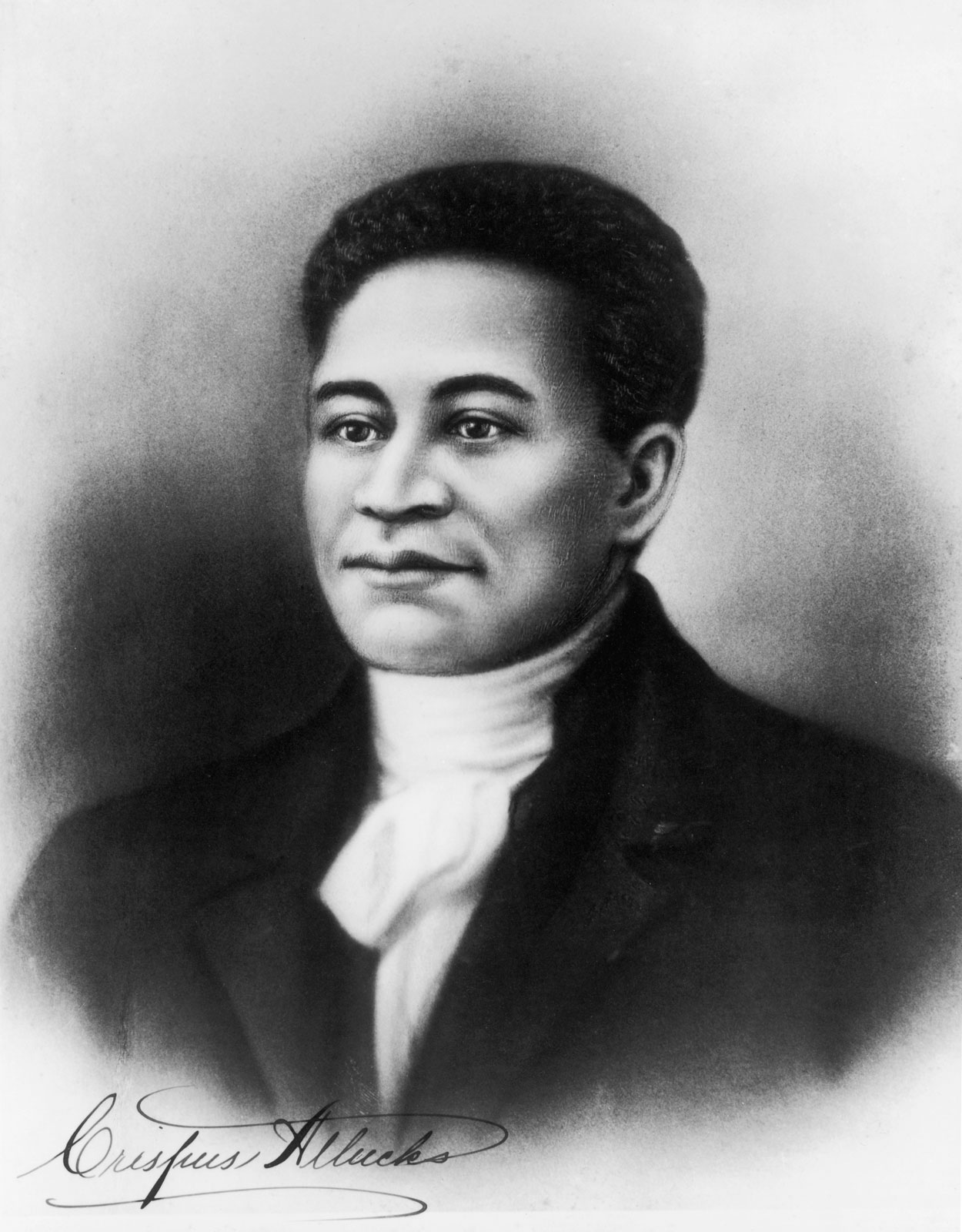
Crispus Attucks, the first "martyr" of the American Revolution. He was of Native American and African American descent.

During the 1770s, Africans, both enslaved and free, helped rebellious American colonists secure their independence by defeating the British in the American Revolutionary War. Blacks played a role in both sides in the American Revolution. Activists in the Patriot cause included James Armistead, Prince Whipple, and Oliver Cromwell. Around 15,000 Black Loyalists left with the British after the war, most of them ending up as free Black people in England or its colonies, such as the Black Nova Scotians and the Sierra Leone Creole people.

In the Spanish Louisiana, Governor Bernardo de Gálvez organized Spanish free Black men into two militia companies to defend New Orleans during the American Revolution. They fought in the 1779 battle in which Spain captured Baton Rouge from the British. Gálvez also commanded them in campaigns against the British outposts in Mobile, Alabama, and Pensacola, Florida. He recruited slaves for the militia by pledging to free anyone who was seriously wounded and promised to secure a low price for coartación (buy their freedom and that of others) for those who received lesser wounds. During the 1790s, Governor Francisco Luis Héctor, baron of Carondelet reinforced local fortifications and recruit even more free Black men for the militia. Carondelet doubled the number of free Black men who served, creating two more militia companies—one made up of Black members and the other of pardo (mixed race). Serving in the militia brought free Black men one step closer to equality with Whites, allowing them, for example, the right to carry arms and boosting their earning power. However, actually these privileges distanced free Black men from enslaved Blacks and encouraged them to identify with Whites.

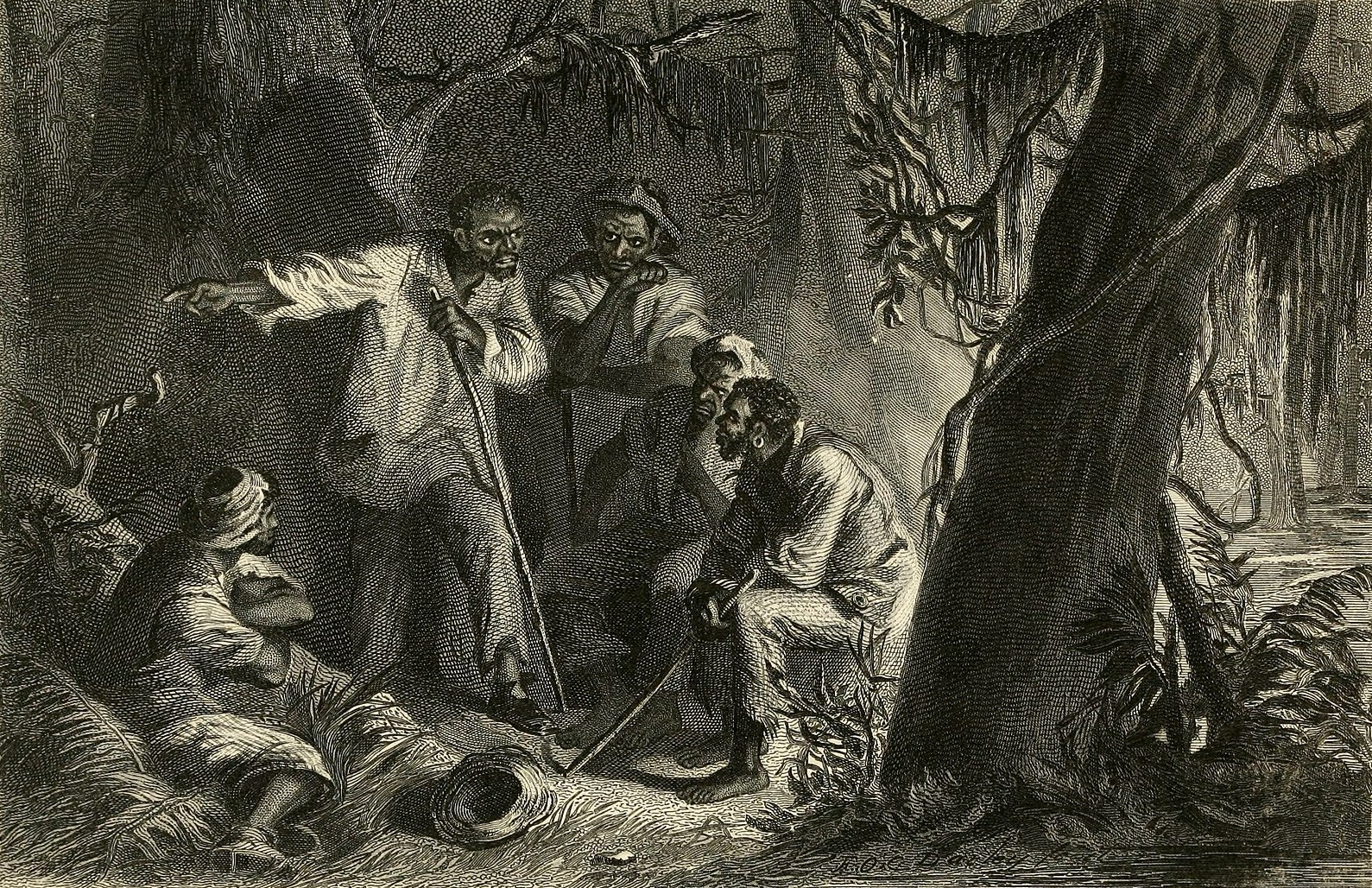
Nat Turner & His Confederates in Conference during the slave rebellion of 1831

Slavery had been tacitly enshrined in the US Constitution through provisions such as Article I, Section 2, Clause 3, commonly known as the 3/5 compromise. Due to the restrictions of Section 9, Clause 1, Congress was unable to pass an Act Prohibiting Importation of Slaves until 1807. Fugitive slave laws (derived from the Fugitive Slave Clause of the Constitution—Article IV, Section 2, Clause 3) were passed by Congress in both 1793 and 1850, guaranteeing the right of a slaveholder to recover an escaped slave anywhere within the US. Slave owners, who viewed slaves as property, ensured that it became a federal crime to aid or assist those who had fled "from the service of their masters" per the 1793 Act signed by Washington, or to interfere with their capture. By that time, slavery, which almost exclusively targeted Black people, had become the most critical and contentious political issue in the Antebellum United States, repeatedly sparking crises and conflicts. Among these were the Missouri Compromise, the Compromise of 1850, the infamous Dred Scott decision, and John Brown's raid on Harpers Ferry.

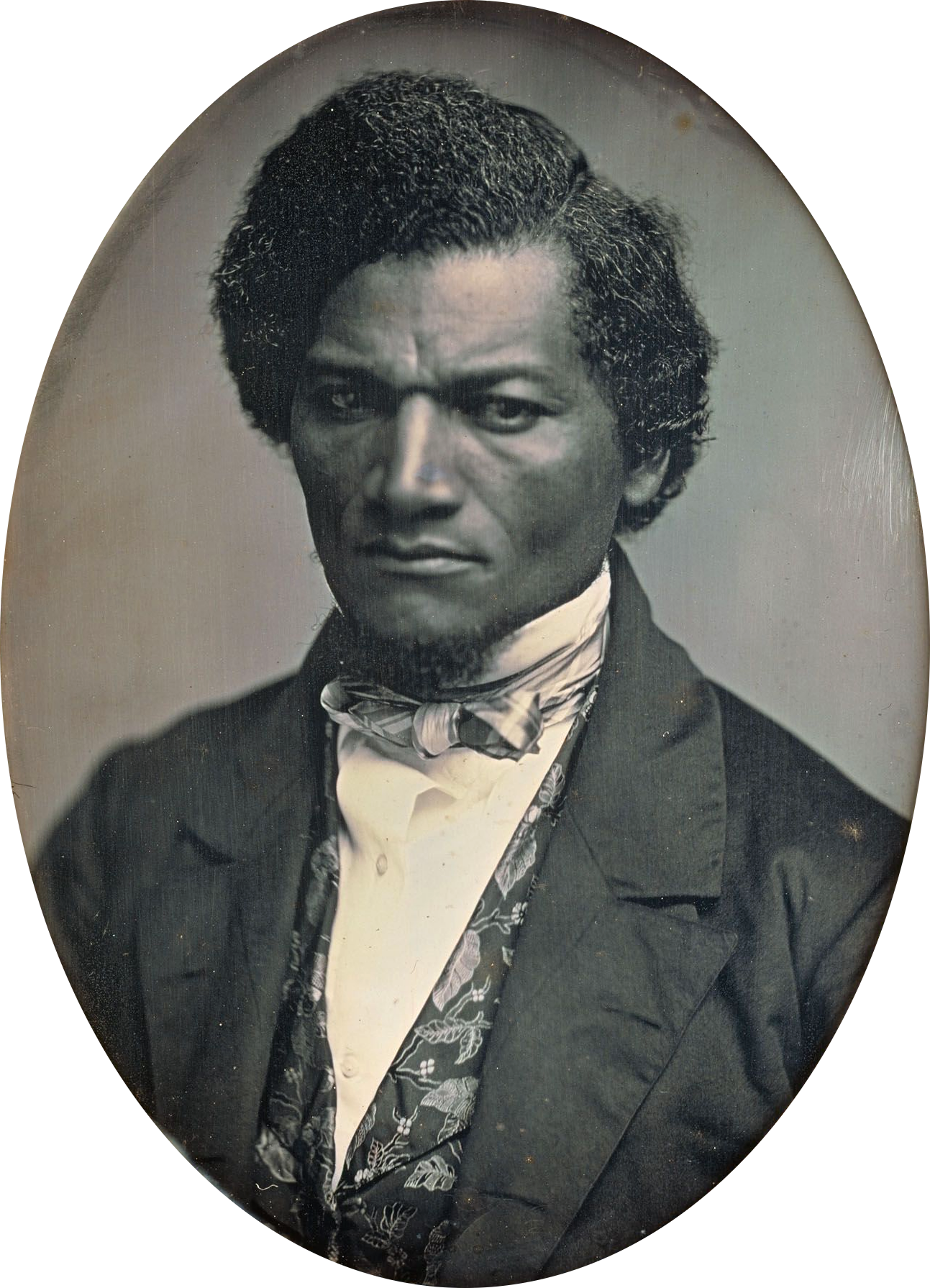
Frederick Douglass (c. 1850) formerly enslaved, who became an abolitionist and statesman

Prior to the Civil War, eight serving presidents had owned slaves, a practice that was legally protected under the US Constitution. By 1860, the number of enslaved Black people in the US had grown to between 3.5 and 4.4 million, largely as a result of the Atlantic slave trade. In addition, 488,000–500,000 Black people lived free around the country, with legislated limits imposed upon them in addition to "unconquerable prejudice" from Whites according to Henry Clay. In response to these conditions, some free Black people chose to leave the US and emigrate to Liberia in West Africa. Liberia had been established in 1821 as a settlement by the American Colonization Society (ACS), with many abolitionist members of the ACS believing Black Americans would have greater opportunities for freedom and equality in Africa than they would in the US.

Slaves not only represented a significant financial investment for their owners, but they also played a crucial role in producing the country's most valuable product and export: cotton. Enslaved people were instrumental in the construction of several prominent structures such as, the United States Capitol, the White House and other Washington, D.C.–based buildings. Similar building projects existed in the slave states.

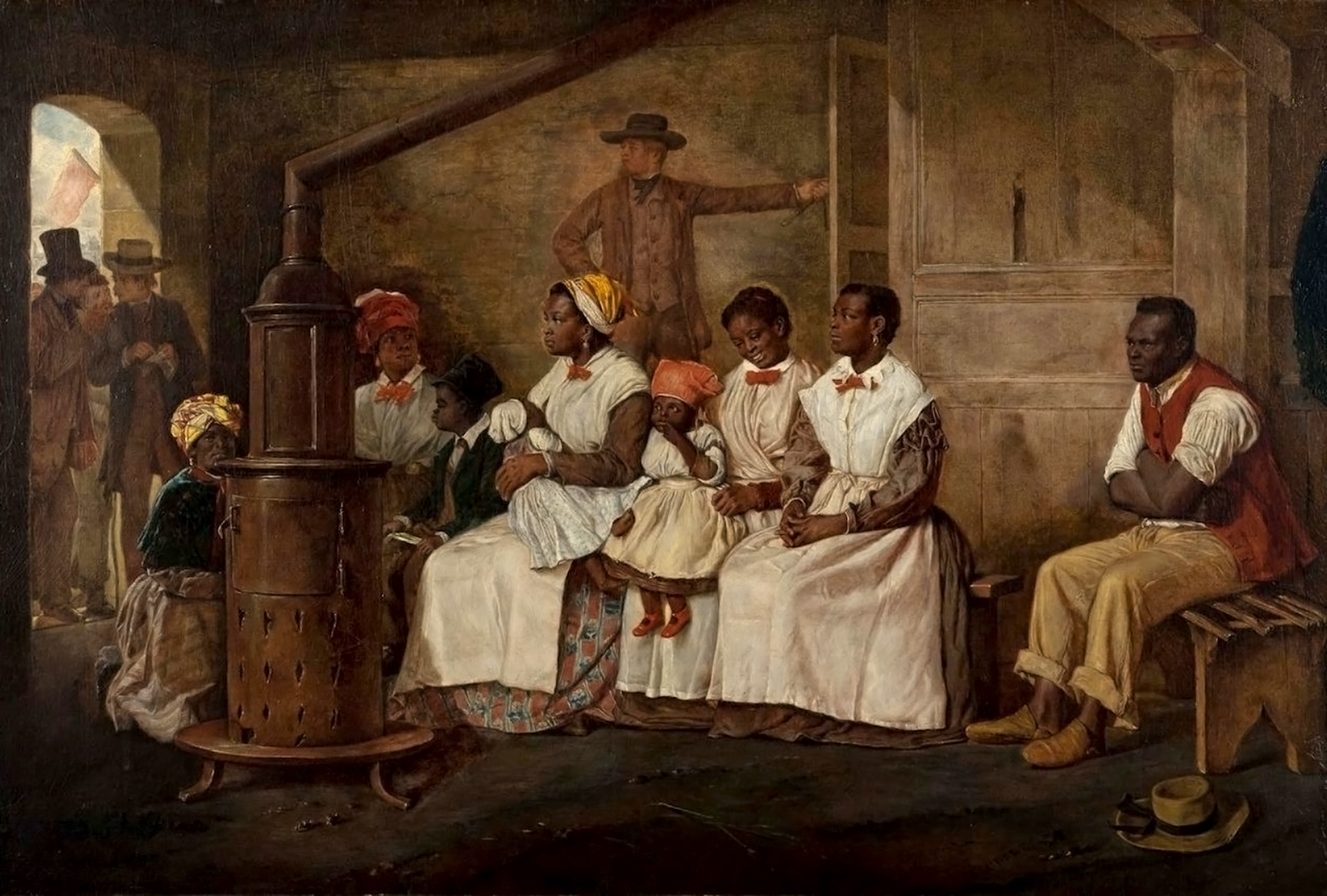
Slaves Waiting for Sale: Richmond, Virginia, 1853. Note the new clothes. The domestic slave trade broke up many families, and individuals lost their connection to families and clans.

By 1815, the domestic slave trade had become a significant and major economic activity in the United States, continuing to flourish until the 1860s. Historians estimate that nearly one million individuals were subjected to this forced migration, which was often referred to as a new "Middle Passage". The historian Ira Berlin described this internal forced migration of enslaved people as the "central event" in the life of a slave during the period between the American Revolution and the Civil War. Berlin emphasized that whether enslaved individuals were directly uprooted or lived in constant fear that they or their families would be involuntarily relocated, "the massive deportation traumatized Black people" throughout the US. As a result of this large-scale forced movement, countless individuals lost their connection to families and clans, and many ethnic Africans lost their knowledge of varying tribal origins in Africa.

For me, my 'X' replaced the white slavemaster name of 'Little' which some blue-eyed devil named Little had imposed upon my paternal forebears.

— Malcolm X explaining in his 1965 autobiography that the "X" symbolized the true African family name that he could never know.

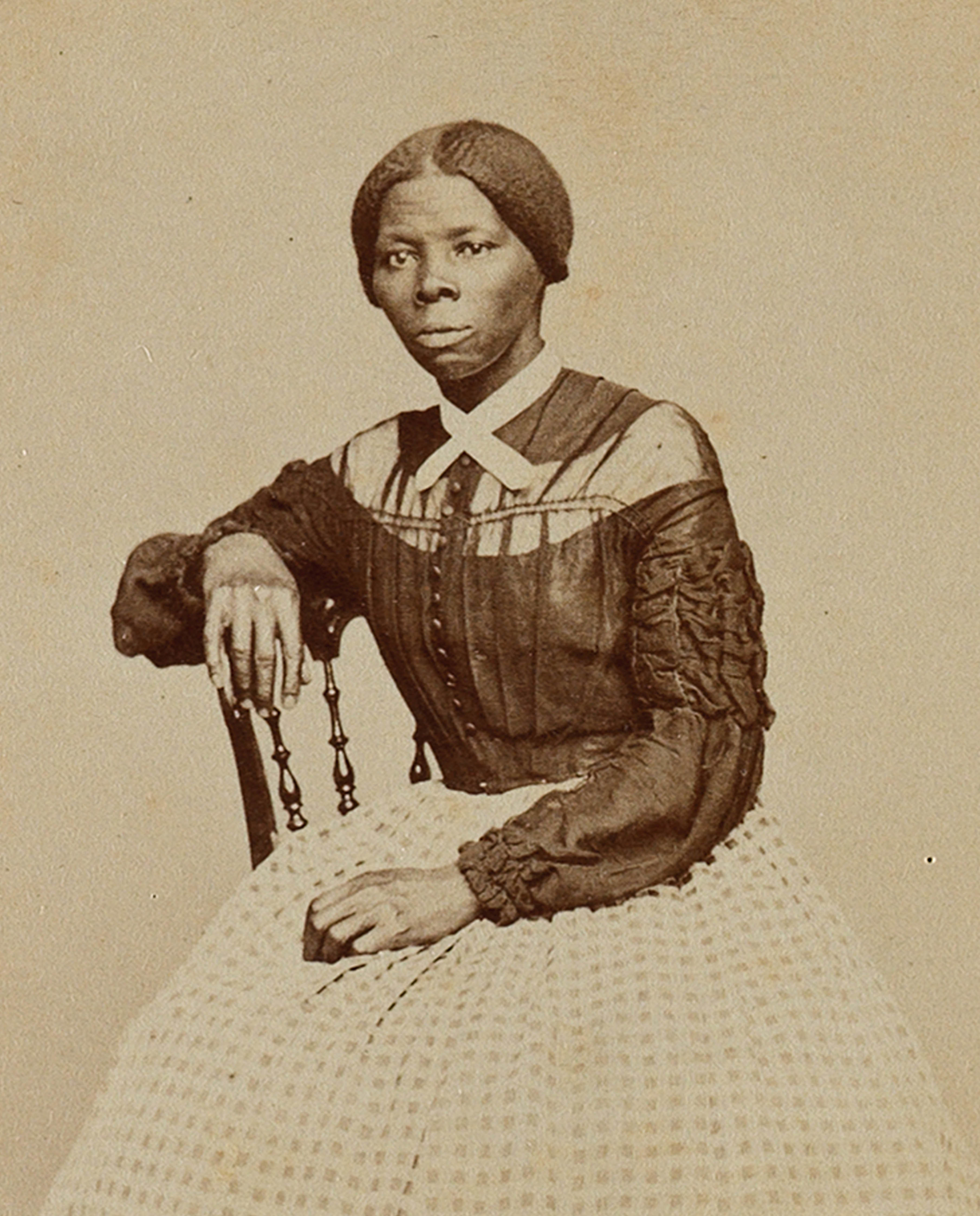
Harriet Tubman (c. 1869) : after escaping slavery, she made some 13 missions to rescue approximately 70 enslaved people

The 1863 photograph of Wilson Chinn, a branded slave from Louisiana, along with the famous image of Gordon and his scarred back, served as two of the earliest and most powerful examples of how the newborn medium of photography could be used to visually document and encapsulate the brutality and cruelty of slavery.

Emigration of free Blacks to their continent of origin had been proposed since the Revolutionary war. After Haiti became independent, it tried to recruit African Americans to migrate there after it re-established trade relations with the United States. The Haitian Union was a group formed to promote relations between the countries. After riots against Blacks in Cincinnati, its Black community sponsored founding of the Wilberforce Colony, an initially successful settlement of African American immigrants to Canada. The colony was one of the first such independent political entities. It lasted for a number of decades and provided a destination for about 200 Black families emigrating from a number of locations in the United States.

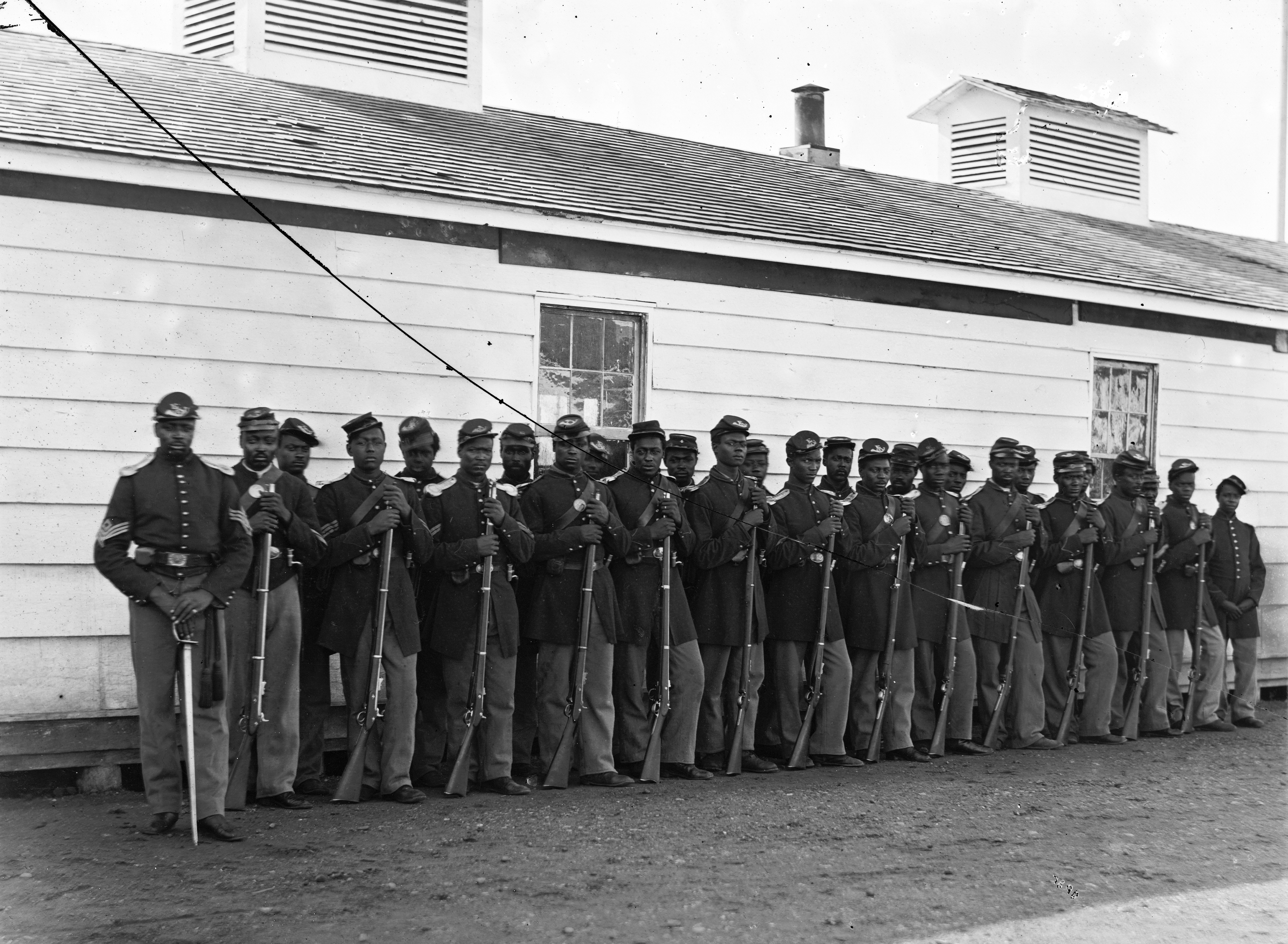
Colored Troops of the Union during the Civil War, 1865

In 1863, during the American Civil War, President Abraham Lincoln signed the Emancipation Proclamation. The proclamation declared that all slaves in Confederate-held territory were free. Advancing Union troops enforced the proclamation, with Texas being the last state to be emancipated, in 1865.

Slavery in a few border states continued until the ratification of the Thirteenth Amendment in December 1865. While the Naturalization Act of 1790 limited US citizenship to Whites only, the 14th Amendment (1868) gave Black people citizenship, and the 15th Amendment (1870) gave Black men the right to vote. In 1870, Hiram R. Revels became the first African American to be elected to the US Congress. In 1871-1873, Oscar Dunn and P. B. S. Pinchback each briefly served as acting Governor of Louisiana, marking the first African Americans to hold the office of state governor.

=== Reconstruction era and Jim Crow ===
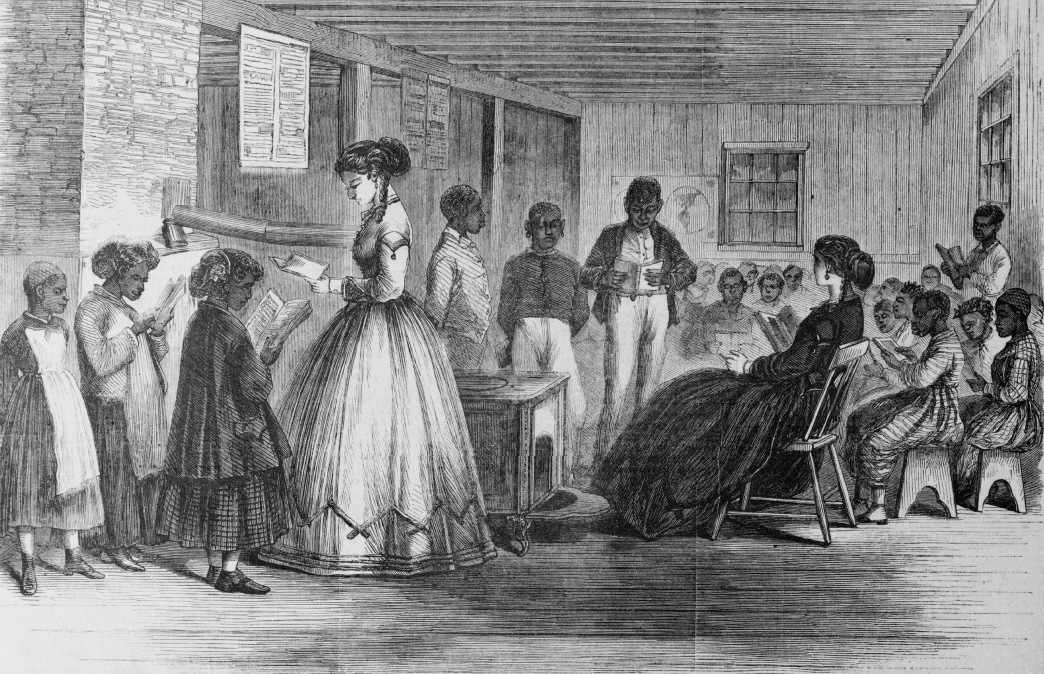
Education at Last. From 1865 to 1872, thousands of newly freed slaves, both young and old, received food, clothing, medical care, and previously denied education, via the War Department's Freedmen's Bureau.

African Americans quickly set up congregations for themselves, as well as schools and community/civic associations, to have space away from White control or oversight. While the post-war Reconstruction era was initially a time of progress for African Americans, that period ended in 1876. By the late 1890s, Southern states enacted Jim Crow laws to enforce racial segregation and disenfranchisement.

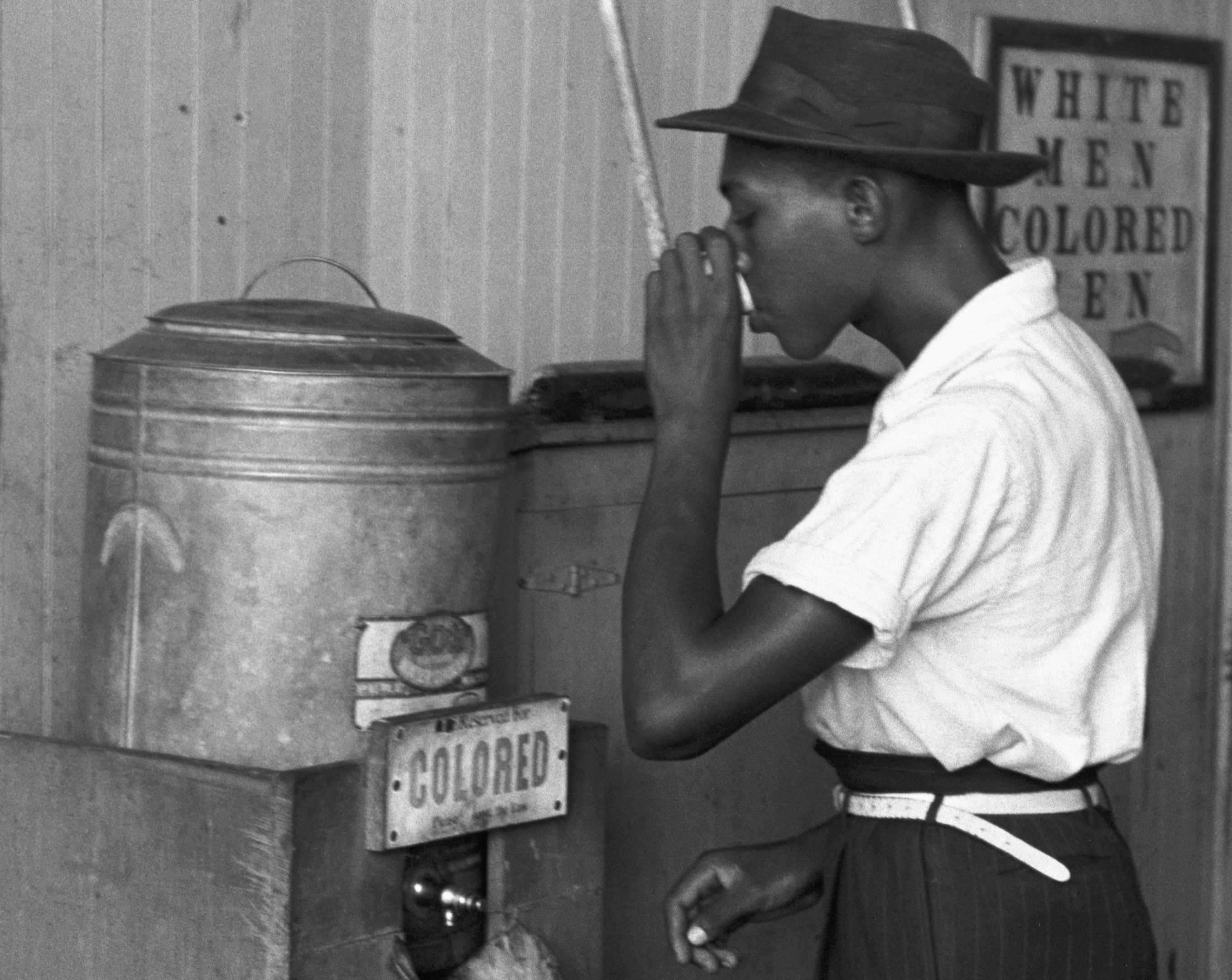
African American man drinking from a segregated water fountain reserved for "Colored", July 1939.

Segregation was imposed with signs showing Blacks where they could legally walk, talk, drink, rest, or eat. For those places that were racially mixed, non-Whites had to wait until all White customers were dealt with. Most African Americans obeyed the segregation laws, to avoid racially motivated violence. To maintain self-esteem and dignity, African Americans such as Anthony Overton and Mary McLeod Bethune continued to build their own schools, churches, banks, social clubs, and other businesses.

In the last decade of the 19th century, racially discriminatory laws and racial violence aimed at African Americans began to mushroom in the United States, a period often referred to as the "nadir of American race relations". These discriminatory acts included racial segregation—upheld by the United States Supreme Court decision in Plessy v. Ferguson in 1896—which was legally mandated by southern states and nationwide at the local level of government, voter suppression or disenfranchisement in the southern states, denial of economic opportunity or resources nationwide, and private acts of violence and mass racial violence aimed at African Americans unhindered or encouraged by government authorities.

=== Great migration and civil rights movement ===
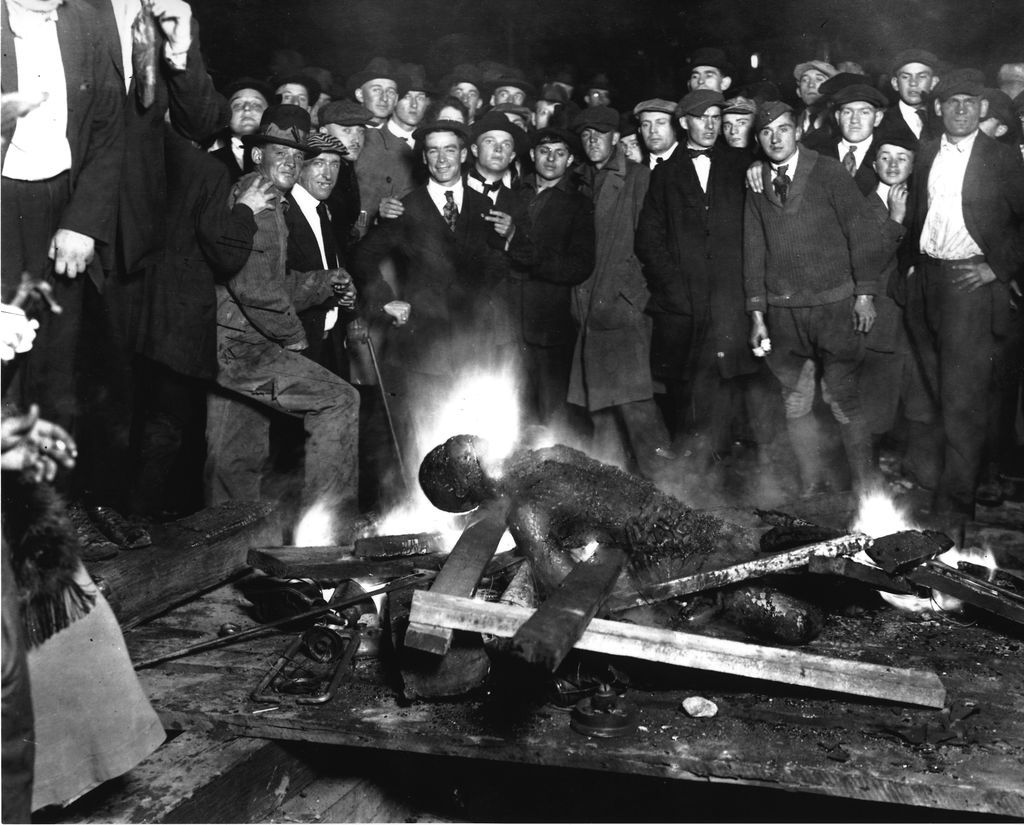
A group of White men pose for a photograph as they stand over the Black victim, Will Brown, who had been lynched and had his body mutilated and burned during the Omaha race riot of 1919 in Omaha, Nebraska. Postcards and photographs of lynchings were popular souvenirs in the US.

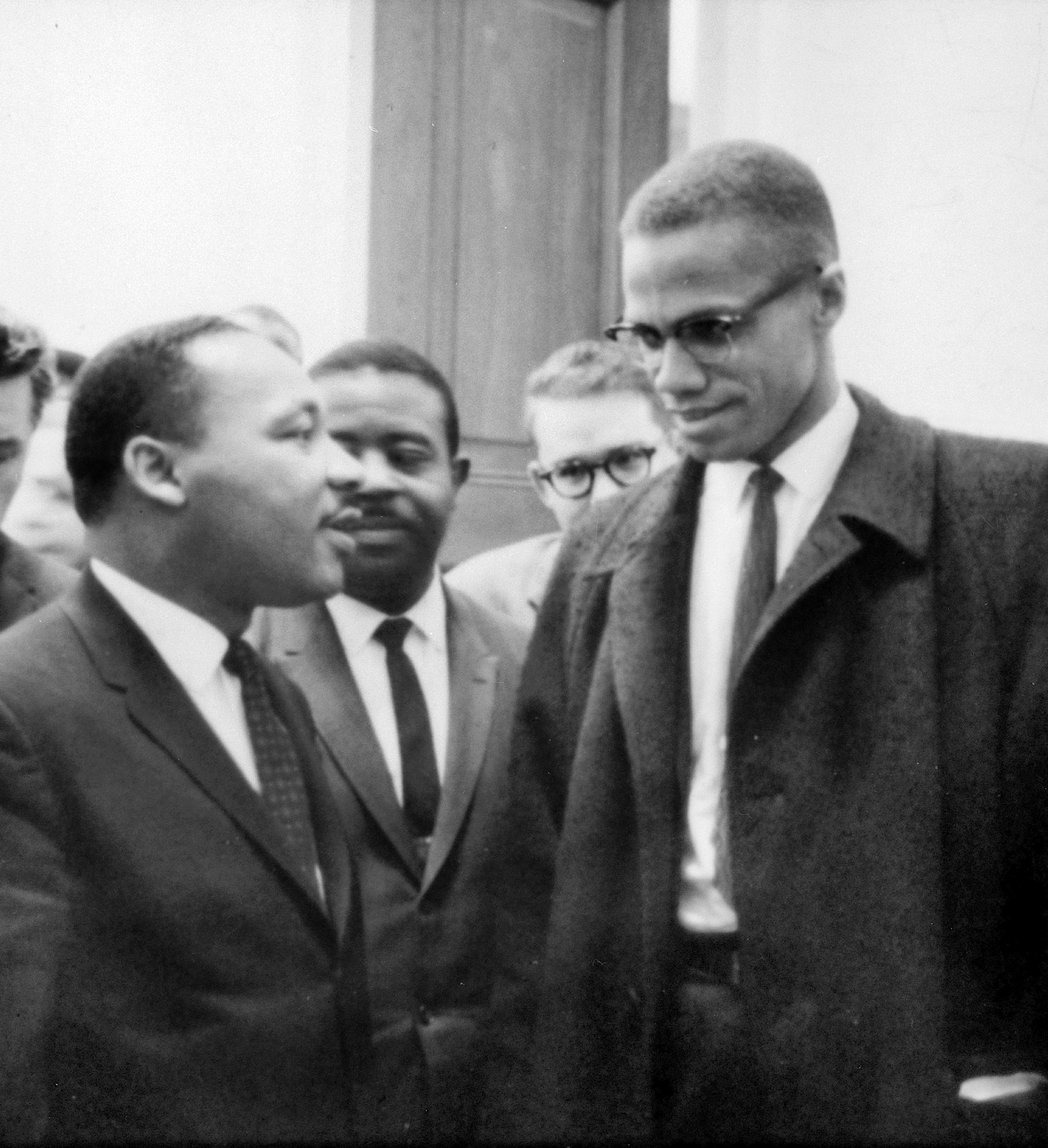
Martin Luther King Jr. and Malcolm X

The desperate conditions of African Americans in the South sparked the Great Migration during the first half of the 20th century which led to a growing African American community in Northern and Western United States. The rapid influx of Blacks disturbed the racial balance within Northern and Western cities, exacerbating hostility between both Blacks and Whites in the two regions. The Red Summer of 1919 was marked by hundreds of deaths and higher casualties across the US as a result of race riots that occurred in more than three dozen cities, such as the Chicago race riot of 1919 and the Omaha race riot of 1919. Overall, Blacks in Northern and Western cities experienced systemic discrimination in a plethora of aspects of life. Within employment, economic opportunities for Blacks were routed to the lowest-status and restrictive in potential mobility. At the 1900 Hampton Negro Conference, Reverend Matthew Anderson said: "...the lines along most of the avenues of wage earning are more rigidly drawn in the North than in the South." Within the housing market, stronger discriminatory measures were used in correlation to the influx, resulting in a mix of "targeted violence, restrictive covenants, redlining and racial steering". While many Whites defended their space with violence, intimidation, or legal tactics toward African Americans, many other Whites migrated to more racially homogeneous suburban or exurban regions, a process known as White flight.

Despite discrimination, drawing cards for leaving the hopelessness in the South were the growth of African American institutions and communities in Northern cities. Institutions included Black oriented organizations (e.g., Urban League, NAACP), churches, businesses, and newspapers, as well as successes in the development in African American intellectual culture, music, and popular culture (e.g., Harlem Renaissance, Chicago Black Renaissance). The Cotton Club in Harlem was a Whites-only establishment, with Blacks (such as Duke Ellington) allowed to perform, but to a White audience. Black Americans also found a new ground for political power in Northern cities, without the enforced disabilities of Jim Crow.

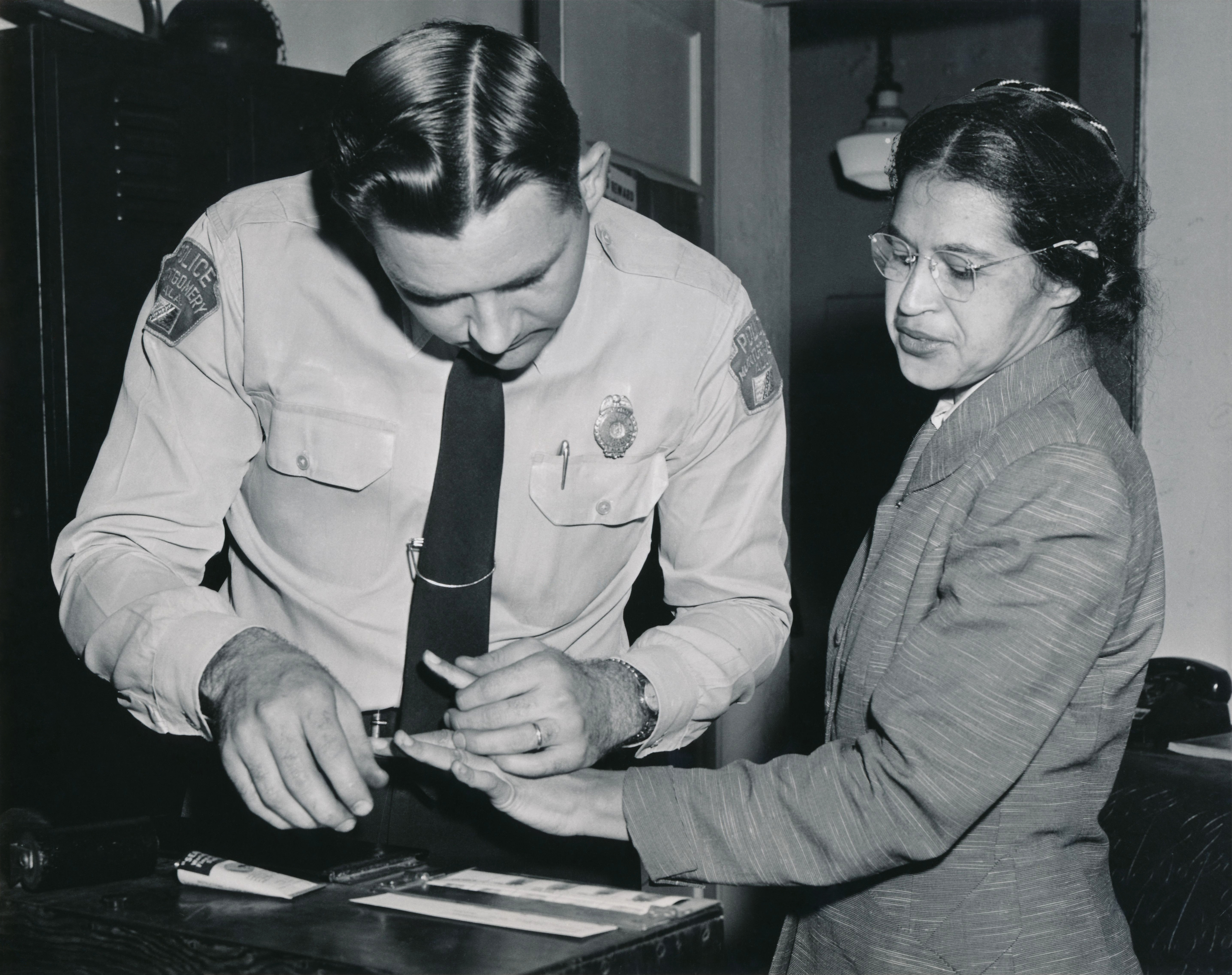
Rosa Parks being fingerprinted after being arrested for not giving up her seat on a bus for a white passenger to sit in the otherwise-empty row

By the 1950s, the civil rights movement was gaining momentum. A 1955 lynching that sparked public outrage about injustice was that of Emmett Till, a 14-year-old boy from Chicago. Spending the summer with relatives in Money, Mississippi, Till was killed for allegedly having wolf-whistled at a White woman. Till had been badly beaten, one of his eyes was gouged out, and he was shot in the head. The visceral response to his mother's decision to have an open-casket funeral mobilized the Black community throughout the US. Vann Newkirk wrote "the trial of his killers became a pageant illuminating the tyranny of White supremacy". The state of Mississippi tried two defendants, but they were speedily acquitted by an all-White jury. One hundred days after Emmett Till's murder, Rosa Parks refused to give up her seat on the bus in Alabama—indeed, Parks told Emmett's mother Mamie Till that "the photograph of Emmett's disfigured face in the casket was set in her mind when she refused to give up her seat on the Montgomery bus."

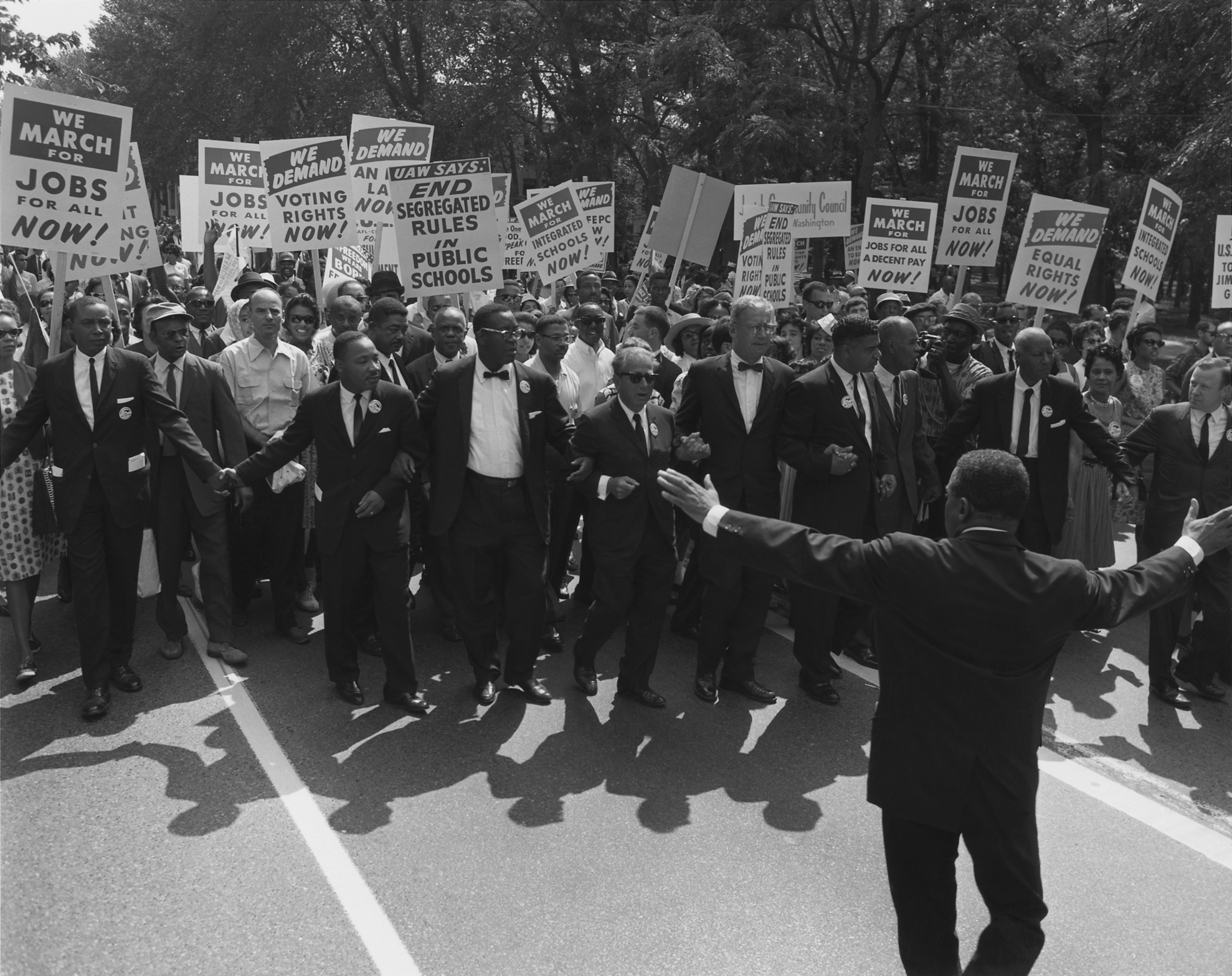
March on Washington for Jobs and Freedom, August 28, 1963, shows civil rights leaders and union leaders.

The March on Washington for Jobs and Freedom and the conditions which brought it into being are credited with putting pressure on presidents John F. Kennedy and Lyndon B. Johnson. Johnson put his support behind passage of the Civil Rights Act of 1964 that banned discrimination in public accommodations, employment, and labor unions, and the Voting Rights Act of 1965, which expanded federal authority over states to ensure Black political participation through protection of voter registration and elections. By 1966, the emergence of the Black Power movement, which lasted from 1966 to 1975, expanded upon the aims of the civil rights movement to include economic and political self-sufficiency, and freedom from White authority.

During the post-war period, many African Americans continued to be economically disadvantaged relative to other Americans. Average Black income stood at 54 percent of that of White workers in 1947, and 55 percent in 1962. In 1959, median family income for Whites was $5,600 (equivalent to $61,849 in 2025), compared with $2,900 (equivalent to $32,029 in 2025) for non-White families. In 1965, 43 percent of all Black families fell into the poverty bracket, earning under $3,000 (equivalent to $30,649 in 2025) a year. The 1960s saw improvements in the social and economic conditions of many Black Americans.

From 1965 to 1969, Black family income rose from 54 to 60 percent of White family income. In 1968, 23 percent of Black families earned under $3,000 (equivalent to $27,775 in 2025) a year, compared with 41 percent in 1960. In 1965, 19 percent of Black Americans had incomes equal to the national median, a proportion that rose to 27 percent by 1967. In 1960, the median level of education for Blacks had been 10.8 years, and by the late 1960s, the figure rose to 12.2 years, half a year behind the median for Whites.

=== Post–civil rights era ===
Politically and economically, African Americans have made substantial strides during the post–civil rights era. In 1967, Thurgood Marshall became the first African American Supreme Court Justice. In 1968, Shirley Chisholm became the first Black woman elected to the US Congress. In 1989, Douglas Wilder became the first African American elected governor in US history. Clarence Thomas succeeded Marshall to become the second African American Supreme Court Justice in 1991. In 1992, Carol Moseley-Braun of Illinois became the first African American woman elected to the US Senate. There were 8,936 Black officeholders in the United States in 2000, showing a net increase of 7,467 since 1970. In 2001, there were 484 Black mayors.

U.S. President Barack Obama's official photograph in the Oval Office in 2012

In 2005, the number of Africans immigrating to the United States, in a single year, surpassed the peak number who were involuntarily brought to the United States during the Atlantic slave trade. On November 4, 2008, Democratic Senator Barack Obama—the son of a White American mother and a Kenyan father—defeated Republican Senator John McCain to become the first African American to be elected president. At least 95 percent of African American voters voted for Obama. He also received overwhelming support from young and educated Whites, a majority of Asians, and Hispanics, picking up a number of new states in the Democratic electoral column. Obama lost the overall White vote, although he won a larger proportion of White votes than any previous non-incumbent Democratic presidential candidate since Jimmy Carter. Obama was reelected for a second and final term, by a similar margin on November 6, 2012. In 2021, Kamala Harris, the daughter of a Jamaican father and Indian mother, became the first woman, the first African American, and the first Asian American to serve as Vice President of the United States. In June 2021, Juneteenth, a day which commemorates the end of slavery in the US, became a federal holiday.

== Demographics ==
Black Americans (alone) population pyramid in 2020

Proportion of African Americans in each US state, Washington, D.C., and Puerto Rico as of the 2020 United States Census

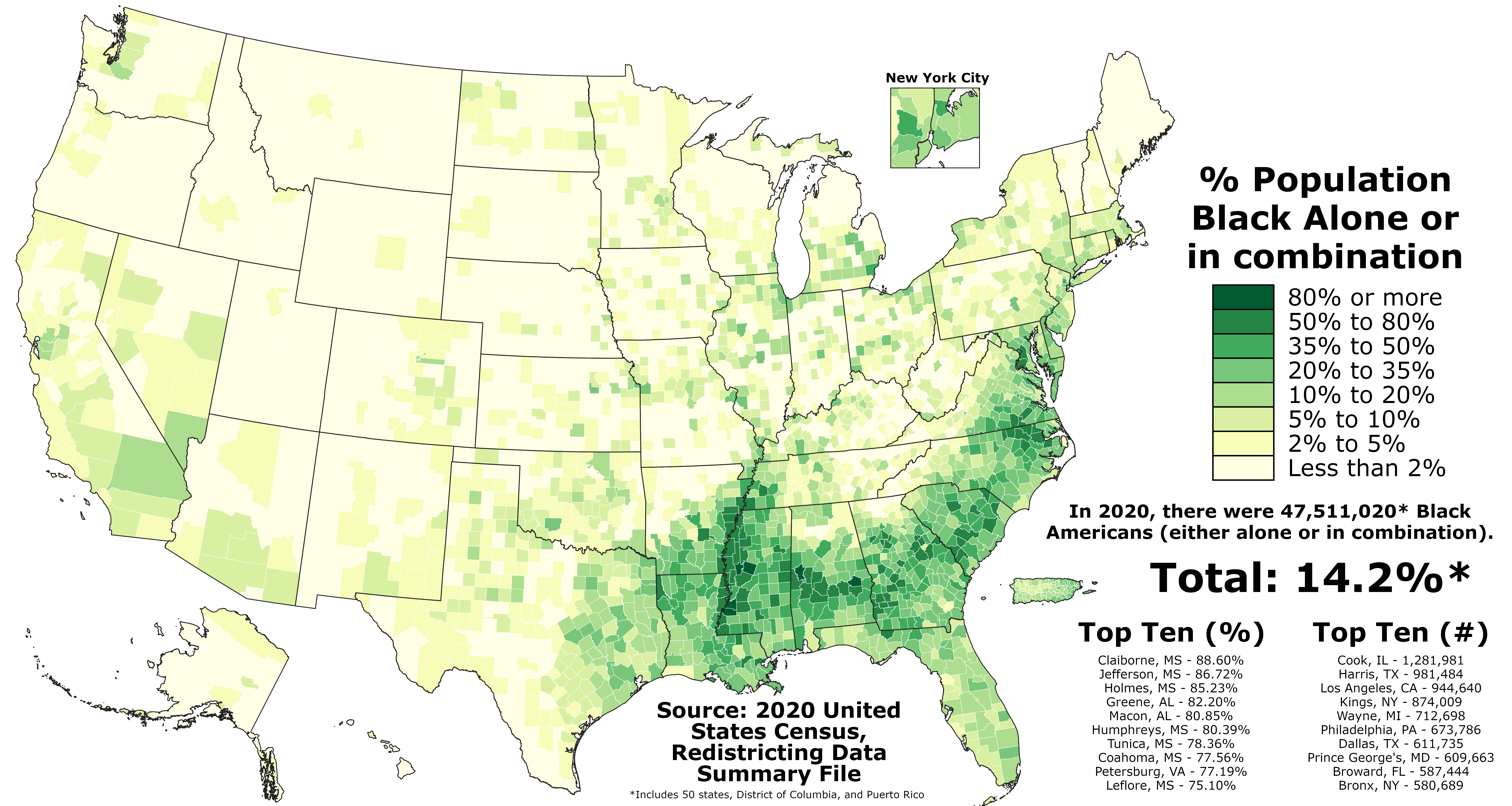
Proportion of Black Americans (alone or in combination) in each county of the fifty states, Washington, D.C., and Puerto Rico as of the 2020 United States census

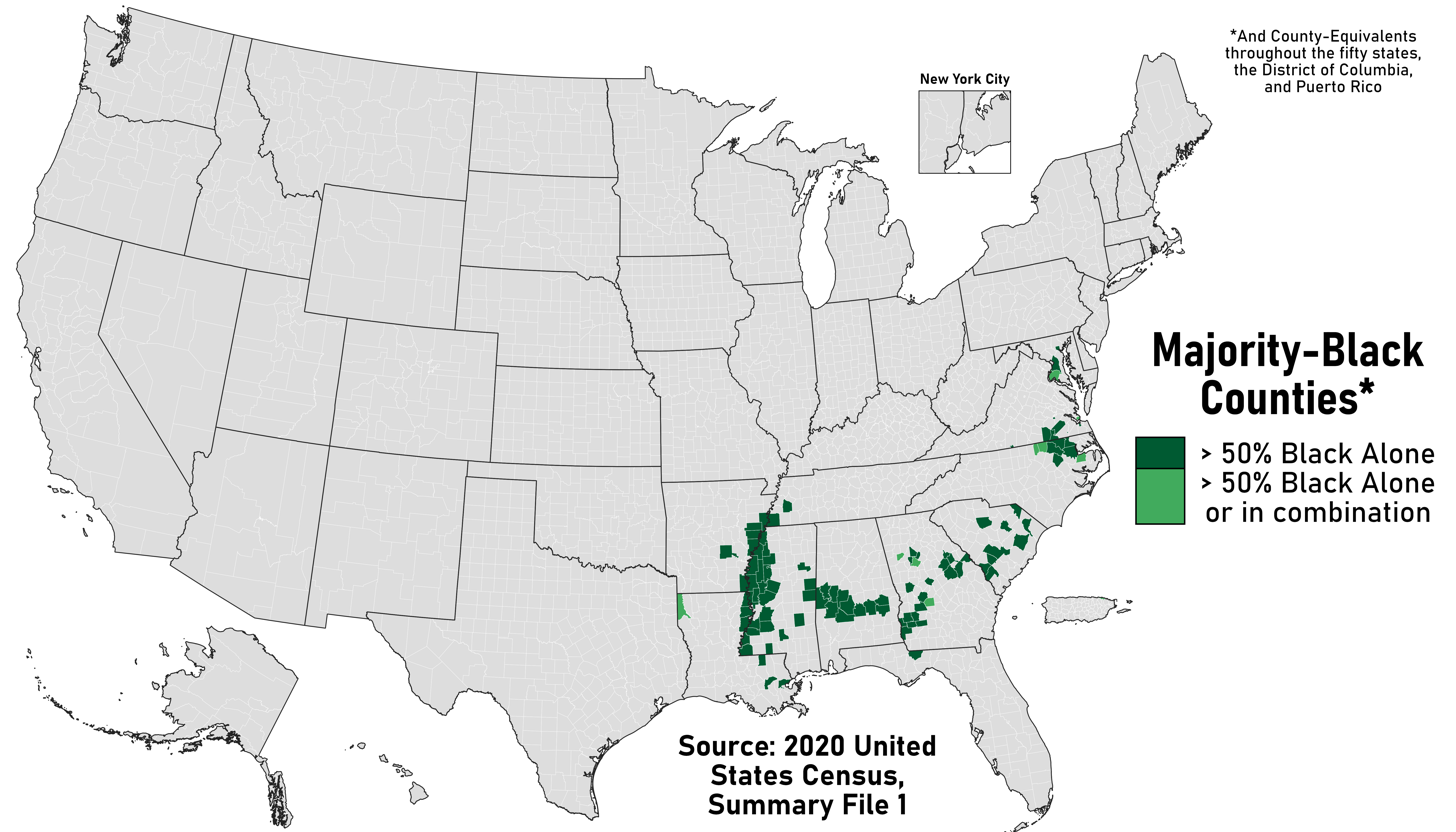
Majority Black American counties in the United States according to the 2020 census

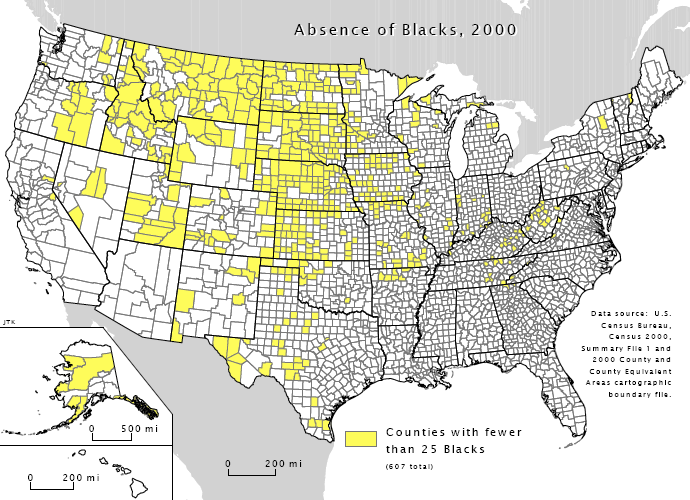
US census map indicating US counties with fewer than 25 Black or African American inhabitants

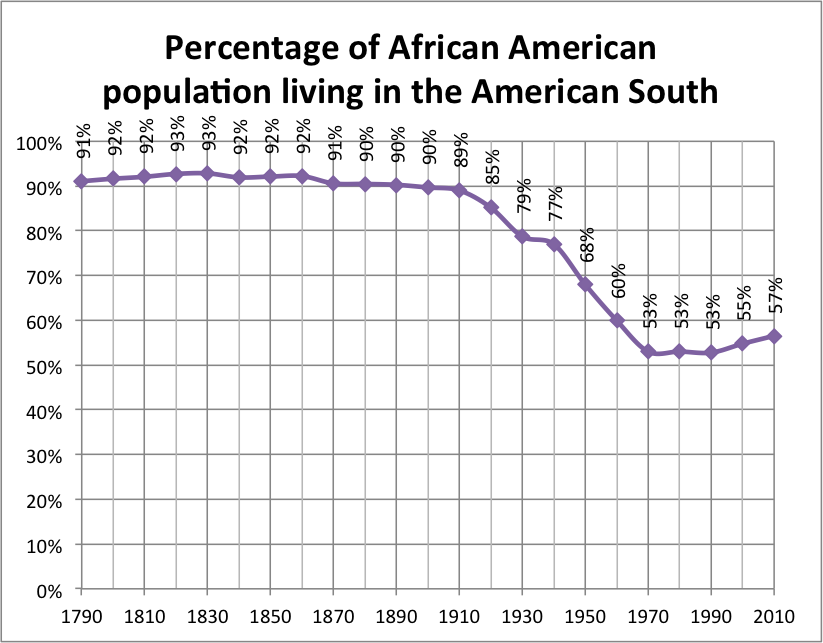
Graph showing the percentage of the African American population living in the American South, 1790–2010. Note the major declines between 1910 and 1940 and 1940–1970, and the reverse trend post-1970. Nonetheless, the absolute majority of the African American population has always lived in the American South.

In 1790, when the first US census was taken, Africans (including slaves and free people) numbered about 760,000—about 19.3% of the population. In 1860, at the start of the Civil War, the African American population had increased to 4.4 million, but the percentage rate dropped to 14% of the overall population of the country. The vast majority were slaves, with only 488,000 counted as "freemen". By 1900, the Black population had doubled and reached 8.8 million.

In 1910, about 90% of African Americans lived in the South. Large numbers began migrating north looking for better job opportunities and living conditions, and to escape Jim Crow laws and racial violence. The Great Migration, as it was called, spanned the 1890s to the 1970s. From 1916 through the 1960s, more than six million Black people moved north. But in the 1970s and 1980s, that trend reversed, with more African Americans moving south to the Sun Belt than leaving it.

The African American population in the United States declined over time as a percentage of the total population until 1930, and has been rising since then:

African Americans in the United States
Year	Number	% of total population	% Change (10 yr)	Slaves	% in slavery
1790	757,208	19.3% (highest)	–	697,681	92%
1800	1,002,037	18.9%	32.3%	893,602	89%
1810	1,377,808	19.0%	37.5%	1,191,362	86%
1820	1,771,656	18.4%	28.6%	1,538,022	87%
1830	2,328,642	18.1%	31.4%	2,009,043	86%
1840	2,873,648	16.8%	23.4%	2,487,355	87%
1850	3,638,808	15.7%	26.6%	3,204,287	88%
1860	4,441,830	14.1%	22.1%	3,953,731	89%
1870	4,880,009	12.7%	9.9%	–	–
1880	6,580,793	13.1%	34.9%	–	–
1890	7,488,788	11.9%	13.8%	–	–
1900	8,833,994	11.6%	18.0%	–	–
1910	9,827,763	10.7%	11.2%	–	–
1920	10.5 million	9.9%	6.8%	–	–
1930	11.9 million	9.7% (lowest)	13%	–	–
1940	12.9 million	9.8%	8.4%	–	–
1950	15.0 million	10.0%	16%	–	–
1960	18.9 million	10.5%	26%	–	–
1970	22.6 million	11.1%	20%	–	–
1980	26.5 million	11.7%	17%	–	–
1990	30.0 million	12.1%	13%	–	–
2000	34.6 million	12.3%	15%	–	–
2010	38.9 million	12.6%	12%	–	–
2020	41.1 million	12.4%	5.6%	–	–

By 1990, the African American population reached about 30 million and represented 12% of the US population, roughly the same proportion as in 1900.

African American groups in the USA
Years	Non-Hispanic Blacks		Black Hispanics		Total
Years	#	%	#	%	Total
2020	39,940,338	12.1%	1,163,862	0.3%	41,104,200

Black Immigrants as a % of black population
Years	Pure ADOS Blacks (millions)		Black Immigrant(millions)		Total
Years	#	%	#	%	Total
2000	32.2	93.1%	2.4	6.9%	34.6
2006	35.7	92.2%	3.0	7.8%	38.7
2010	35.4	91.0%	3.5	9.0%	38.9
2015	35.5	89.9%	4.0	10.1%	39.5
2019	36.1	88.7%	4.6	11.3%	40.7
2024	43.6	86.4%	5.6	13.6%	41.1

At the time of the 2000 US census, 54.8% of African Americans lived in the South. In that year, 17.6% of African Americans lived in the Northeast and 18.7% in the Midwest, while only 8.9% lived in the Western states. The west does have a sizable Black population in certain areas, however. California, the nation's most populous state, has the fifth-largest African American population, only behind New York, Texas, Georgia, and Florida. According to the 2000 census, approximately 2.05% of African Americans identified as Hispanic or Latino in origin, many of whom may be of Brazilian, Puerto Rican, Dominican, Cuban, Haitian, or other Latin American descent. The only self-reported ancestral groups larger than African Americans are the Irish and Germans.

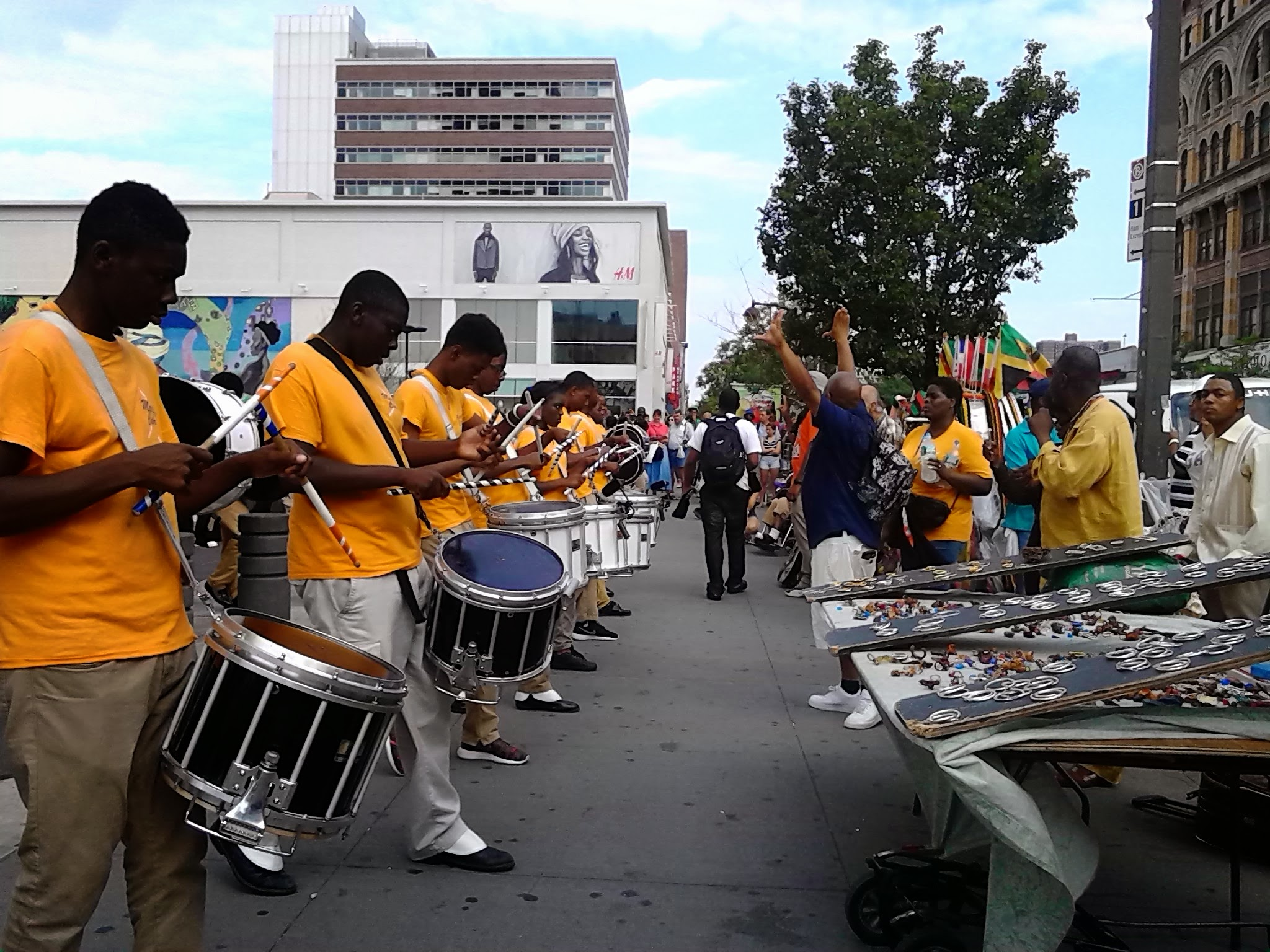
Band rehearsal on 125th Street in Harlem, the historic epicenter of African American culture. New York City is home by a significant margin to the world's largest Black population of any city outside Africa, at over 2.2 million. African immigration to New York City is now driving the growth of the city's Black population.

According to the 2010 census, nearly 3% of people who self-identified as Black had recent ancestors who immigrated from another country. Self-reported non-Hispanic Black immigrants from the Caribbean, mostly from Jamaica and Haiti, represented 0.9% of the US population, at 2.6 million. Self-reported Black immigrants from sub-Saharan Africa also represented 0.9%, at about 2.8 million. Additionally, self-identified Black Hispanics represented 0.4% of the United States population, at about 1.2 million people, largely found within the Puerto Rican and Dominican communities. Self-reported Black immigrants hailing from other countries in the Americas, such as Brazil and Canada, as well as several European countries, represented less than 0.1% of the population. Mixed-race Hispanic and non-Hispanic Americans who identified as being part Black, represented 0.9% of the population. Of the 12.6% of United States residents who identified as Black, around 10.3% were "native Black American" or ethnic African Americans, who are direct descendants of West/Central Africans brought to the US as slaves. These individuals make up well over 80% of all Blacks in the country. When including people of mixed-race origin, about 13.5% of the US population self-identified as Black or "mixed with Black". However, according to the US Census Bureau, evidence from the 2000 census indicates that many African and Caribbean immigrant ethnic groups do not identify as "Black, African Am., or Negro". Instead, they wrote in their own respective ethnic groups in the "Some Other Race" write-in entry. As a result, the census bureau devised a new, separate "African American" ethnic group category in 2010 for ethnic African Americans. Nigerian Americans and Ethiopian Americans were the most reported sub-Saharan African groups in the United States.

In the 2020 census, the African American population was undercounted at an estimated rate of 3.3%, up from 2.1% in 2010.

=== Proportion in each county ===
African American (Alone) population distribution over time

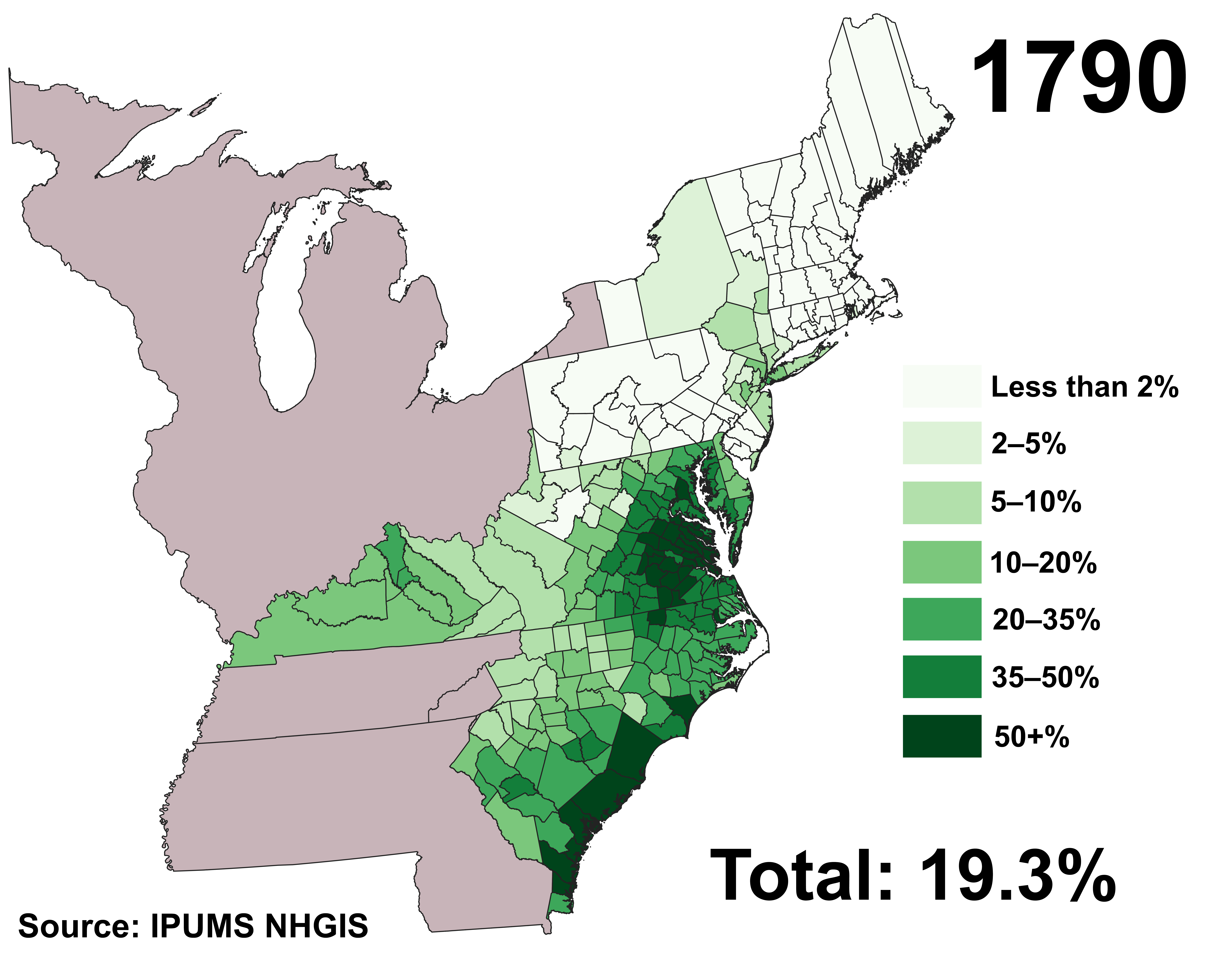
1790

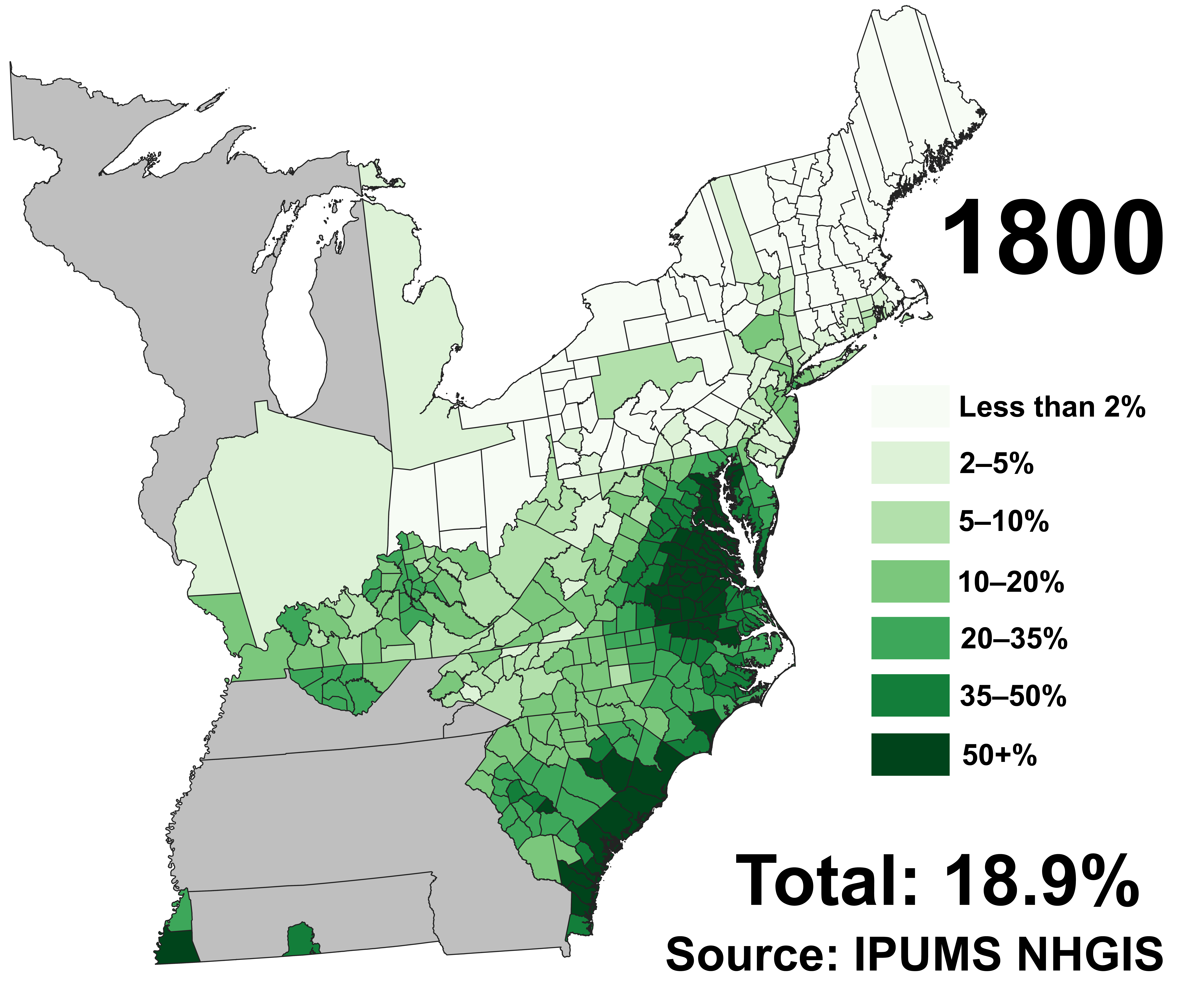
1800

1810

1820

1830

1840

1850

1860

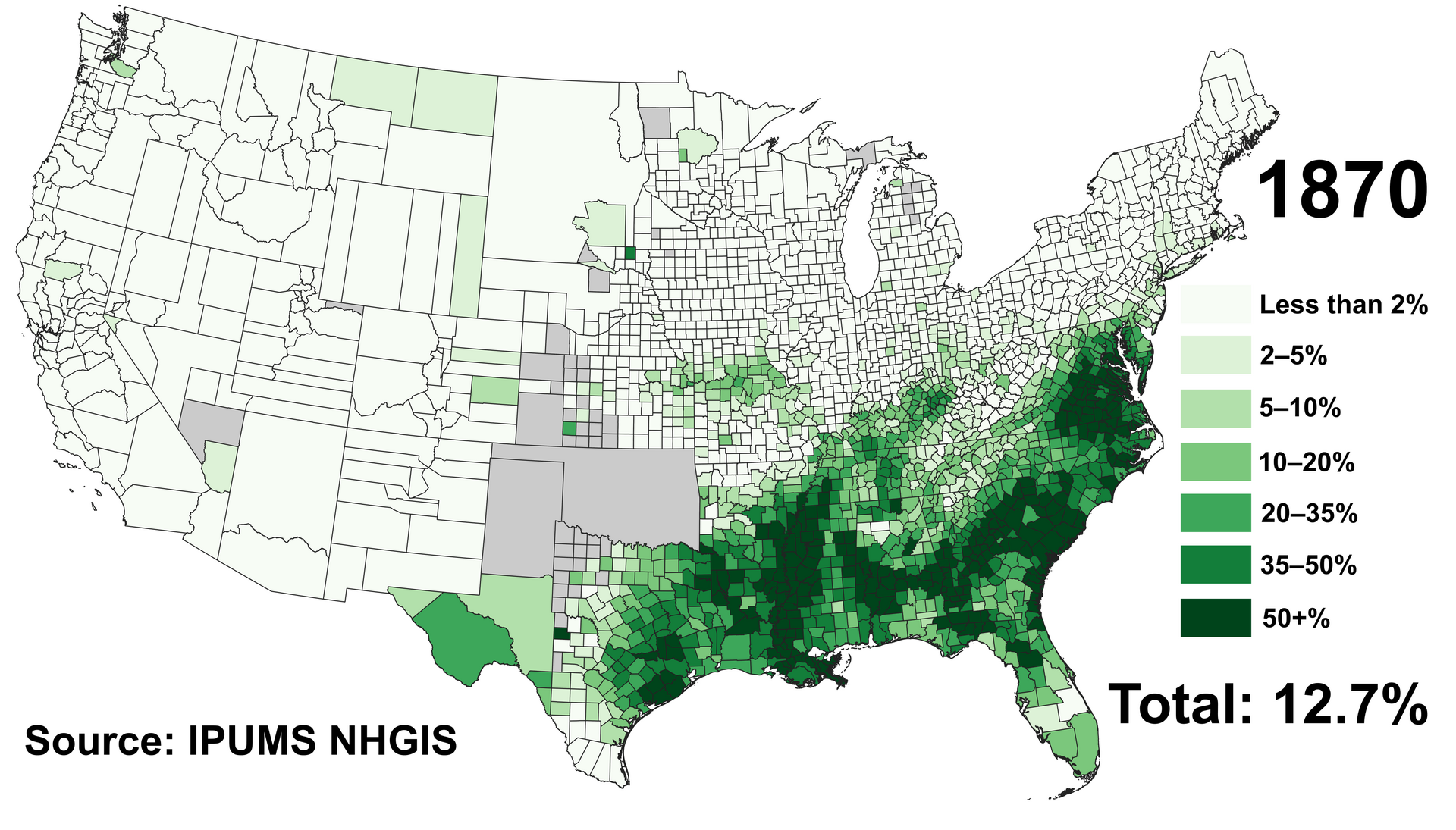
1870

1880

1890

1900

1910

1920

1930

1940

1970

1980

1990

2000

2010

2020

Texas has the largest African American population by state with approximately four million. Following Texas is Florida, with 3.8 million, and Georgia, with 3.6 million. Mississippi is the state with the highest African American share of the population at 39%. Following Mississippi is Louisiana at 34%, and Georgia at 32%.

=== US cities ===
After 100 years of African Americans leaving the south in large numbers seeking better opportunities and treatment in the west and north, a movement known as the Great Migration, there is now a reverse trend, called the New Great Migration. As with the earlier Great Migration, the New Great Migration is primarily directed toward cities and large urban areas, such as Charlotte, Houston, Dallas, Fort Worth, Huntsville, Raleigh, Tampa, San Antonio, New Orleans, Memphis, Nashville, Jacksonville, and so forth. A growing percentage of African Americans from the west and north are migrating to the southern region of the US for economic and cultural reasons. In 2020, New York City, Chicago, and Los Angeles metropolitan areas had the highest decline in African Americans, while Atlanta, Dallas, and Houston had the highest increase respectively. Despite recent declines, as of 2020, the New York City metropolitan area still has the largest African American metropolitan population in the United States and the only to have over three million African Americans.

Among cities of 100,000 or more, South Fulton, Georgia had the highest percentage of Black residents of any large US city in 2020, with 93%. Other large cities with African American majorities include Jackson, Mississippi (80%), Detroit, Michigan (80%), Birmingham, Alabama (70%), Miami Gardens, Florida (67%), Memphis, Tennessee (63%), Montgomery, Alabama (62%), Baltimore, Maryland (60%), Augusta, Georgia (59%), Shreveport, Louisiana (58%), New Orleans, Louisiana (57%), Macon, Georgia (56%), Baton Rouge, Louisiana (55%), Hampton, Virginia (53%), Newark, New Jersey (53%), Mobile, Alabama (53%), Cleveland, Ohio (52%), and Brockton, Massachusetts (51%).

Claiborne County, Mississippi is the Blackest county in the U.S. at 87% Black in 2020. Cook County, Illinois has the largest Black population in the U.S. with 1,185,601 Black residents in 2020.

The nation's most affluent community with an African American majority resides in View Park–Windsor Hills, California, with an annual median household income of $159,618 and median home price of about $1.5 million in 2025. Other largely affluent and African American communities include Prince George's County (namely Mitchellville, Woodmore, Upper Marlboro) and Charles County in Maryland, DeKalb County (namely Stonecrest, Lithonia, Smoke Rise) and South Fulton in Georgia, Charles City County in Virginia, Baldwin Hills in California, Hillcrest and Uniondale in New York, and Cedar Hill, DeSoto, and Missouri City in Texas. Additionally, there is a significant affluent Black presence in the southern Chicago suburbs of Cook County, Illinois. A report from the National Association of Real Estate Brokers (NAREB) indicated that five of the top ten municipalities nationwide (with at least 500 Black households) registering the highest Black homeownership rates were in this area – including Olympia Fields, South Holland, Flossmoor, Matteson, and Lynwood. In 2006, Queens County, New York was the only county with a population of 65,000 or more where African Americans had a higher median household income than White Americans.

Seatack, Virginia is currently the oldest African American community in the United States. It survives today with a vibrant and active civic community.

=== Education ===
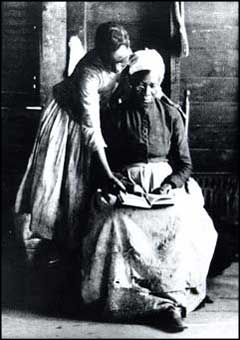
Former slave learning to read, 1870

During slavery, anti-literacy laws were enacted in the US that prohibited education for Black people. Slave owners saw literacy as a threat to the institution of slavery. As a North Carolina statute stated, "Teaching slaves to read and write, tends to excite dissatisfaction in their minds, and to produce insurrection and rebellion."

When slavery was finally abolished in 1865, public educational systems were expanding across the country. By 1870, around seventy-four institutions in the south provided a form of advanced education for African American students. By 1900, over a hundred programs at these schools provided training for Black professionals, including teachers. Many of the students at Fisk University, including the young W. E. B. Du Bois, taught school during the summers to support their studies.

African Americans were very concerned to provide quality education for their children, but White supremacy limited their ability to participate in educational policymaking on the political level. State governments soon moved to undermine their citizenship by restricting their right to vote. By the late 1870s, Blacks were disenfranchised and segregated across the American South. White politicians in Mississippi and other states withheld financial resources and supplies from Black schools. Nevertheless, the presence of Black teachers, and their engagement with their communities both inside and outside the classroom, ensured that Black students had access to education despite these external constraints.

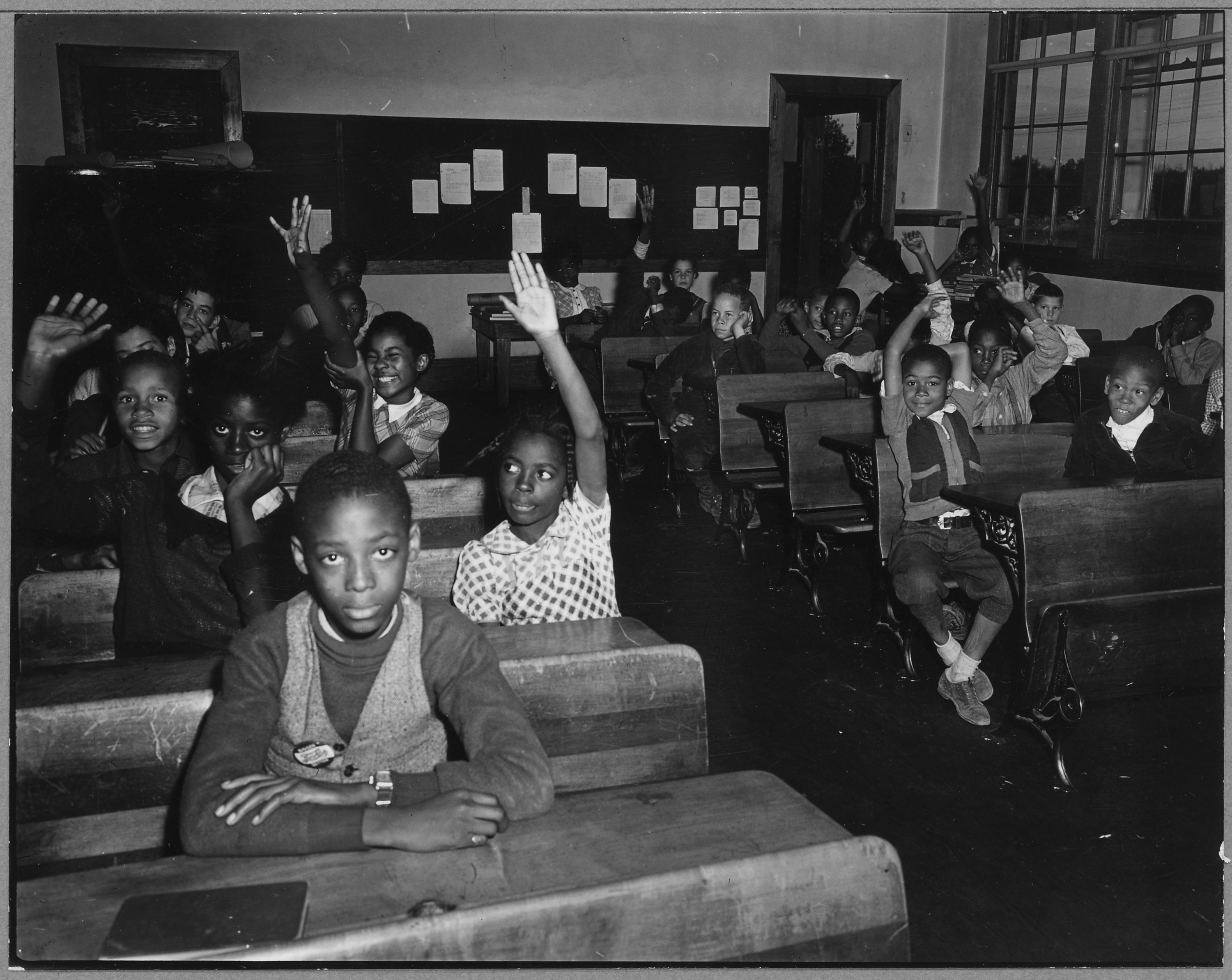
Students in the one-room Waldorf Negro elementary school in Waldorf, Maryland, 1941

During World War II, demands for unity and racial tolerance on the home front provided an opening for the first Black history curriculum in the country. For example, during the early 1940s, Madeline Morgan, a Black teacher in the Chicago public schools, created a curriculum for students in grades one through eight highlighting the contributions of Black people to the history of the United States. At the close of the war, Chicago's Board of Education downgraded the curriculum's status from mandatory to optional.

Predominantly Black schools for kindergarten through twelfth grade students were common throughout the US before the 1970s. By 1972, however, desegregation efforts meant that only 25% of Black students were in schools with more than 90% non-White students. However, since then, a trend towards re-segregation affected communities across the country: by 2011, 2.9 million African American students were in such overwhelmingly minority schools, including 53% of Black students in school districts that were formerly under desegregation orders.

As late as 1947, about one third of African Americans over 65 were considered to lack the literacy to read and write their own names. By 1969, illiteracy as it had been traditionally defined, had been largely eradicated among younger African Americans.

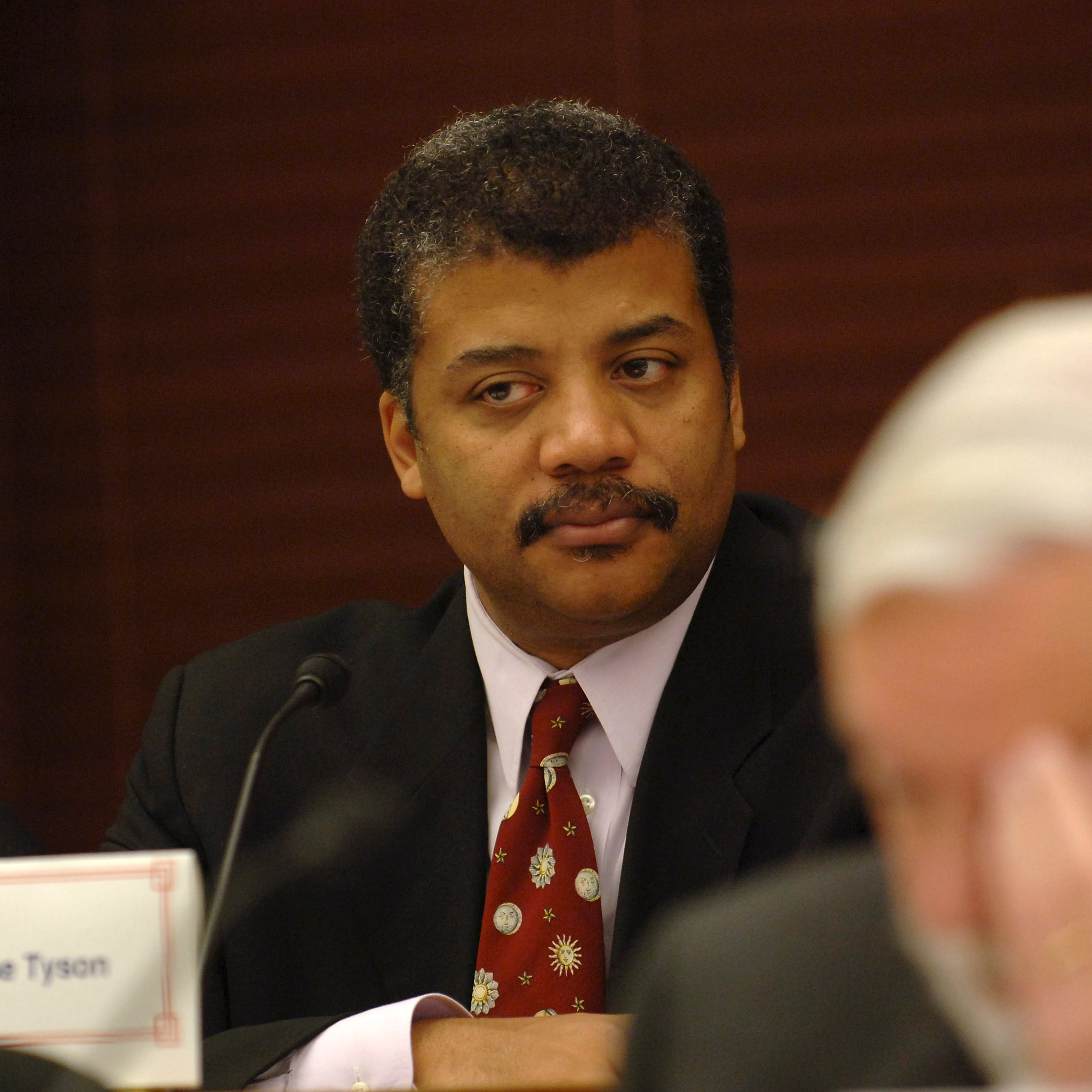
Astrophysicist Neil deGrasse Tyson is director of New York City's Hayden Planetarium.

Between 1995 and 2009, freshmen college enrollment for African Americans increased by 73 percent and only 15 percent for Whites. Black women are enrolled in college more than any other race and gender group, leading all with 9.7% enrolled according to the 2011 US census. The average high school graduation rate of Blacks in the United States has steadily increased to 71% in 2013. Separating this statistic into component parts shows it varies greatly depending upon the state and the school district examined. 38% of Black males graduated in the state of New York but in Maine 97% graduated and exceeded the White male graduation rate by 11 percentage points. In much of the southeastern United States and some parts of the southwestern United States the graduation rate of White males was in fact below 70% such as in Florida where 62% of White males graduated from high school. Examining specific school districts paints an even more complex picture. In the Detroit school district, the graduation rate of Black males was 20% but 7% for White males. In the New York City school district 28% of Black males graduate from high school compared to 57% of White males. In Newark County 76% of Black males graduated compared to 67% for White males. Further academic improvement has occurred in 2015. Roughly 23% of all Blacks have bachelor's degrees. In 1988, 21% of Whites had obtained a bachelor's degree versus 11% of Blacks. In 2015, 23% of Blacks had obtained a bachelor's degree versus 36% of Whites. Foreign born Blacks, 9% of the Black population, made even greater strides. They exceed native born Blacks by 10 percentage points.

College Board, which runs the official college-level advanced placement (AP) programs in American high schools, have has received criticism in recent years that its curricula have focused too much on Euro-centric history. In 2020, College Board reshaped some curricula among history-based courses to further reflect the African diaspora. In 2021, College Board announced it would be piloting an AP African American Studies course between 2022 and 2024. The course officially launched in August 2024.

In June 2023, the Supreme Court ended race-based affirmative action at American colleges and universities. This landmark Supreme Court decision is widely believed to contribute to a decline in African American enrollment at the nation's most selective and prominent colleges and universities, where African American applicants often have, on average, lower standardized test scores and GPAs compared to the overall applicant pool. In response, many of the nation's most prominent historically black colleges and universities (HBCUs) have reported a significant surge in applications and enrollment.

Slightly more than 250,000 African American students in the high school graduating class of 2025 took the Scholastic Aptitude Test (SAT) making up 13% of test takers. African American students had an average score of 904 which is lower than the national average of 1,209. Asian American students had the highest average with 1,229.

According to a 2025 study, African Americans have the highest average student debt. African Americans with bachelor's degrees owe an average of $52,726 in student loans. Nearly 70% of African Americans took out a loan to fund their undergraduate education. African American women, in particular, carry the highest average student debt in the nation.

==== Historically black colleges and universities ====
Historically black colleges and universities (HBCUs), which were founded when segregated institutions of higher learning did not admit African Americans, continue to thrive and educate students of all races today. There are 107 HBCUs representing three percent of the nation's colleges and universities with the majority established in the Southeast. HBCUs have been largely responsible for establishing and expanding the African American middle-class by providing more career opportunities for African Americans.

=== Economic status ===
The economic disparity between the races in the US has marginally improved since the end of slavery. In 1863, two years prior to emancipation, Black people owned 0.5 percent of the national wealth, while in 2019 it is just over 1.5 percent. Racial disparity in poverty rates has narrowed since the civil rights era, with the poverty rate among African Americans decreasing from 24.7% in 2004 to 18.8% in 2020, compared to 10.5% for all Americans. Poverty is associated with higher rates of marital stress and dissolution, physical and mental health problems, disability, cognitive deficits, low educational attainment, and crime.

African Americans have a long and diverse history of business ownership. Although the first African American business is unknown, slaves captured from West Africa are believed to have established commercial enterprises as peddlers and skilled craftspeople as far back as the 17th century. Around 1900, Booker T. Washington became the most famous proponent of African American businesses. His critic and rival W. E. B. DuBois also commended business as a vehicle for African American advancement.

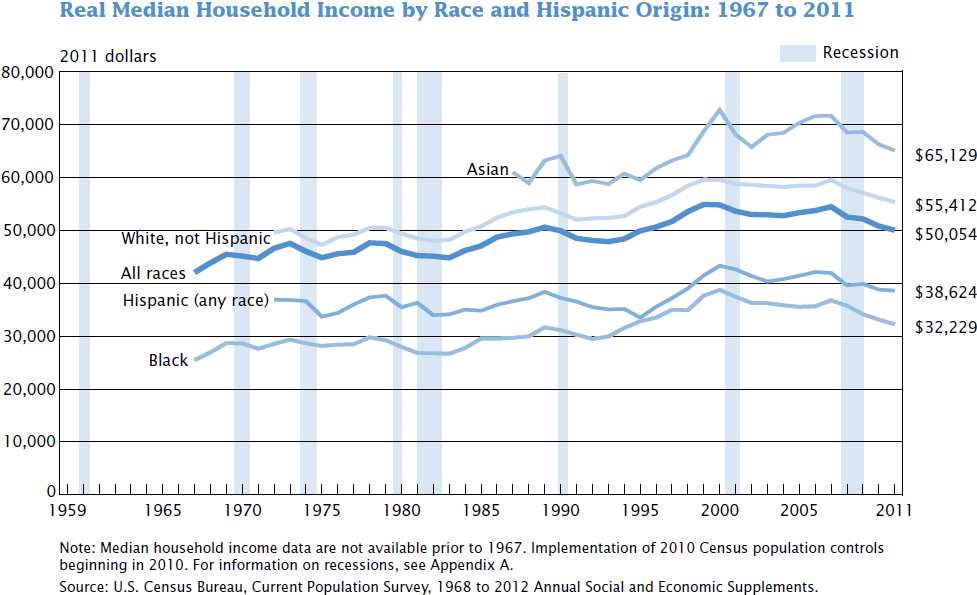
This graph shows the real median US household income by race: 1967 to 2011, in 2011 dollars.

African Americans had a combined buying power of over $1.6 trillion as of 2021, a 171% increase of their buying power in 2000 but lagging significantly in growth behind American Latinos and Asians in the same timer period (with 288% and 383%, respectively; for reference, US growth overall was 144% in the same period); however, African American net worth had shrunk 14% in the previous year despite strong growth in property prices and the S&P 500. In 2002, African American-owned businesses accounted for 1.2 million of the US's 23 million businesses. As of 2011, African American-owned businesses account for approximately two million US businesses. Black-owned businesses experienced the largest growth in number of businesses among minorities from 2002 to 2011.

Twenty-five percent of Blacks had white-collar occupations (management, professional, and related fields) in 2000, compared with 33.6% of Americans overall. In 2001, over half of African American households of married couples earned $50,000 or more. Although in the same year African Americans were over-represented among the nation's poor, this was directly related to the disproportionate percentage of African American families headed by single women; such families are collectively poorer, regardless of ethnicity.

In 2006, the median earnings of African American men was more than Black and non-Black American women overall, and in all educational levels. At the same time, among American men, income disparities were significant; the median income of African American men was approximately 76 cents for every dollar of their European American counterparts, although the gap narrowed somewhat with a rise in educational level.

Overall, the median earnings of African American men were 72 cents for every dollar earned of their Asian American counterparts, and $1.17 for every dollar earned by Hispanic men. On the other hand, by 2006, among American women with post-secondary education, African American women have made significant advances; the median income of African American women was more than those of their Asian-, European- and Hispanic American counterparts with at least some college education.

The US public sector is the single most important source of employment for African Americans. During 2008–2010, 21.2% of all Black workers were public employees, compared with 16.3% of non-Black workers. Both before and after the onset of the Great Recession, African Americans were 30% more likely than other workers to be employed in the public sector. The public sector is also a critical source of decent-paying jobs for Black Americans. For both men and women, the median wage earned by Black employees is significantly higher in the public sector than in other industries.

In 1999, the median income of African American families was $33,255 compared to $53,356 of European Americans. In times of economic hardship for the nation, African Americans suffer disproportionately from job loss and underemployment, with the Black underclass being hardest hit. The phrase "last hired and first fired" is reflected in the Bureau of Labor Statistics unemployment figures. Nationwide, the October 2008 unemployment rate for African Americans was 11.1%, while the nationwide rate was 6.5%. In 2007, the average income for African Americans was approximately $34,000, compared to $55,000 for Whites. African Americans experience a higher rate of unemployment than the general population.

The income gap between Black and White families is also significant. In 2005, employed Blacks earned 65% of the wages of Whites, down from 82% in 1975. The New York Times reported in 2006 that in Queens, New York, the median income among African American families exceeded that of White families, which the newspaper attributed to the growth in the number of two-parent Black families. It noted that Queens was the only county with more than 65,000 residents where that was true. In 2011, it was reported that 72% of Black babies were born to unwed mothers. The poverty rate among single-parent Black families was 39.5% in 2005, according to Walter E. Williams, while it was 9.9% among married-couple Black families. Among White families, the respective rates were 26.4% and 6% in poverty.

Collectively, African Americans are more involved in the American political process than other minority groups in the United States, indicated by the highest level of voter registration and participation in elections among these groups in 2004. African Americans also have the highest level of Congressional representation of any minority group in the US.

==== African American homeownership ====
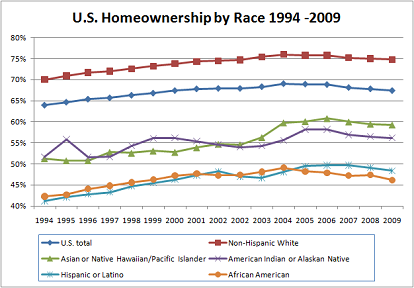
The US homeownership rate according to race

Homeownership in the US is the strongest indicator of financial stability and the primary asset most Americans use to generate wealth. African Americans continue to lag behind other racial groups in homeownership. In the first quarter of 2021, 45.1% of African Americans owned their homes, compared to 65.3% of all Americans. The African American homeownership rate has remained relatively flat since the 1970s despite an increase in anti-discrimination housing laws and protections. The African American homeownership rate peaked in 2004 at 49.7%.

The average White high school drop-out still has a slightly better chance of owning a home than the average African American college graduate usually due to unfavorable debt-to-income ratios or credit scores among most African American college graduates. Since 2000, fast-growing housing costs in most cities have made it even more difficult for the US African American homeownership rate to significantly grow and reach over 50% for the first time in history. From 2000 to 2022, the median home price in the US grew 160%, outpacing average annual household income growth in that same period, which only grew about 30%. South Carolina is the state with the most African American homeownership, with about 55% of African Americans owning their own homes.

Black people, who make up 12% of the total U.S. population, make up 32% of all people experiencing homelessness, according to the data.

=== Politics ===
Year	Candidate of the plurality	Political party	% of Black vote	Result
1980	Jimmy Carter	Democratic	83%	Lost
1984	Walter Mondale	Democratic	91%	Lost
1988	Michael Dukakis	Democratic	89%	Lost
1992	Bill Clinton	Democratic	83%	Won
1996	Bill Clinton	Democratic	84%	Won
2000	Al Gore	Democratic	90%	Lost
2004	John Kerry	Democratic	88%	Lost
2008	Barack Obama	Democratic	95%	Won
2012	Barack Obama	Democratic	93%	Won
2016	Hillary Clinton	Democratic	88%	Lost
2020	Joe Biden	Democratic	87%	Won
2024	Kamala Harris	Democratic	85%	Lost

Since the mid-20th century, a large majority of African Americans support the Democratic Party. In the 2024 Presidential election, 86% of African American voters supported Democrat Kamala Harris, while 13% supported Republican Donald Trump. Although there is an African American lobby in foreign policy, it has not had the impact that African American organizations have had in domestic policy.

Many African Americans were excluded from electoral politics in the decades following the end of Reconstruction. For those that could participate, until the New Deal, African Americans were supporters of the Republican Party because it was Republican President Abraham Lincoln who helped in granting freedom to American slaves; at the time, the Republicans and Democrats represented the sectional interests of the North and South, respectively, rather than any specific ideology, and both conservative and liberal were represented equally in both parties.

The African American trend of voting for Democrats can be traced back to the 1930s during the Great Depression, when Franklin D. Roosevelt's New Deal program provided economic relief to African Americans. Roosevelt's New Deal coalition turned the Democratic Party into an organization of the working class and their liberal allies, regardless of region. The African American vote became even more solidly Democratic when Democratic presidents John F. Kennedy and Lyndon B. Johnson pushed for civil rights legislation during the 1960s. In 1960, nearly a third of African Americans voted for Republican Richard Nixon.

Conservatism has been growing among African Americans, particularly since the 2020 Presidential election. In the 2024 election, Trump secured a slightly larger share of the African American vote compared to his 2020 performance.

==== Black national anthem ====
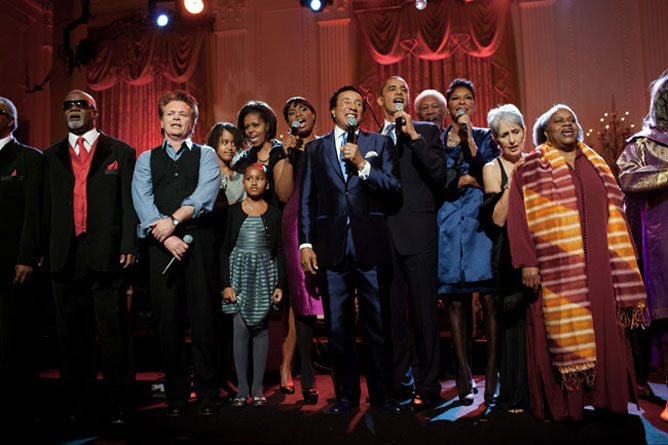
"Lift Every Voice and Sing" being sung by the family of Barack Obama, Smokey Robinson and others in the White House in 2014

"Lift Every Voice and Sing" is often referred to as the Black national anthem in the United States. In 1919, the National Association for the Advancement of Colored People (NAACP) had dubbed it the "Negro national anthem" for its power in voicing a cry for liberation and affirmation for African-American people.

=== Religion ===
Religious affiliation of African Americans in 2007
1. Black Protestant (59.0%)
2. Evangelical Protestant (15.0%)
3. Mainline Protestant (4.00%)
4. Roman Catholic (5.00%)
5. Jehovah's Witness (1.00%)
6. Other Christian (1.00%)
7. Muslim (1.00%)
8. Other religion (1.00%)
9. Unaffiliated (11.0%)
10. Atheist or agnostic (2.00%)

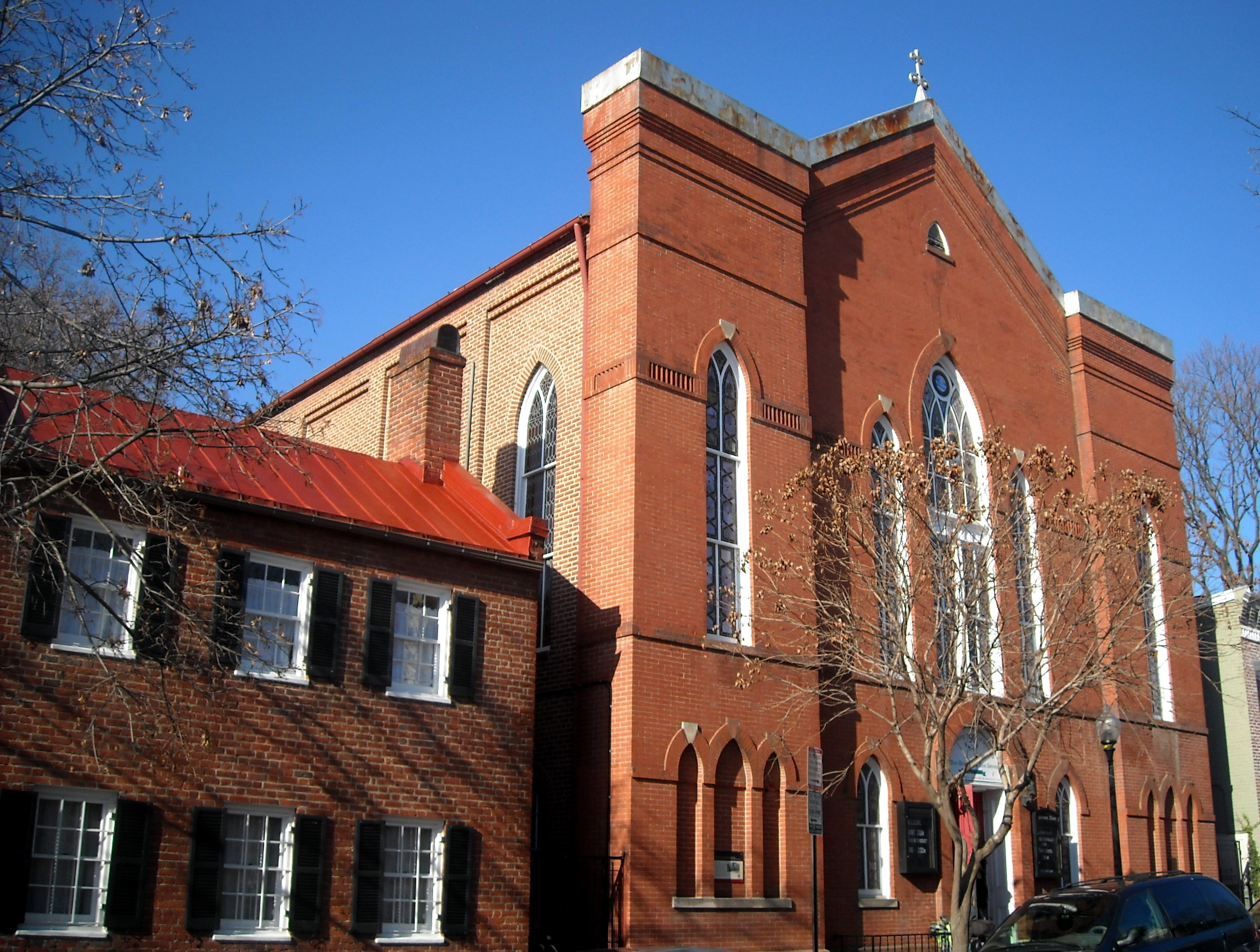
Mount Zion United Methodist Church is the oldest African American congregation in Washington, D.C.

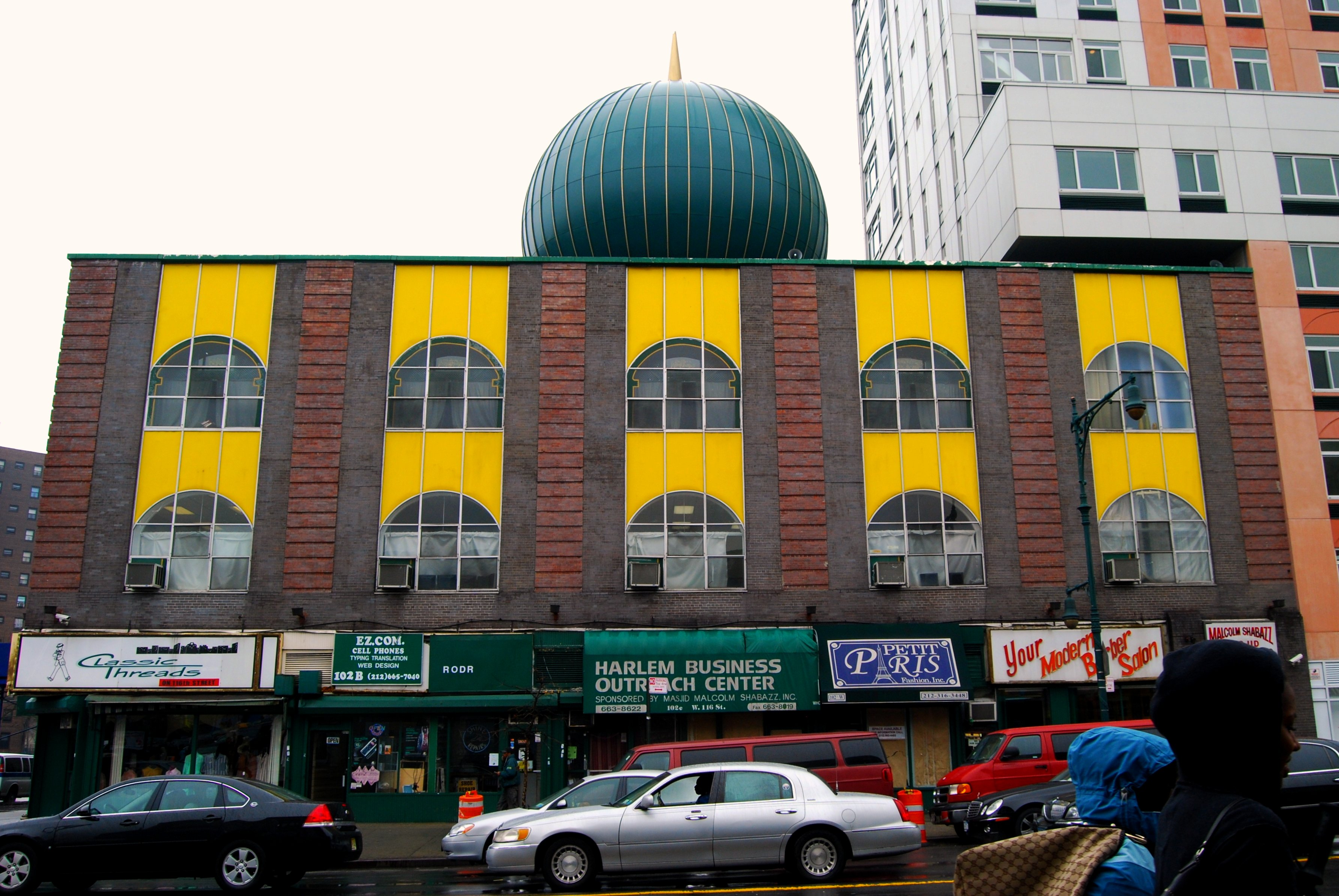
Masjid Malcolm Shabazz in Harlem, New York City

The majority of African Americans are Protestant, many of whom follow the historically Black churches. The term Black church refers to churches which minister to predominantly African American congregations. Black congregations were first established by freed slaves at the end of the 17th century, and later when slavery was abolished more African Americans were allowed to create a unique form of Christianity that was culturally influenced by African spiritual traditions. One of these early African American Christian cultural traditions in the Black Church is the Watchnight service, also called Freedom's Eve, where African American congregations all over the nation come together on New Year's Eve through New Year's morning in remembrance of the eve and New Year of their emancipation, sharing testimonies, being baptized and partaking in praise and worship.

According to a 2007 survey, more than half of the African American population are part of the historically Black churches. The largest Protestant denomination among African Americans is the Baptists, distributed mainly in four denominations, the largest being the National Baptist Convention, USA and the National Baptist Convention of America. The second-largest is the Methodists, the largest organizations of which are the African Methodist Episcopal Church and the African Methodist Episcopal Zion Church.

Pentecostals are distributed among several different religious bodies, with the Church of God in Christ as the largest among them by far. About 16% of African American Christians are members of White Protestant communions; these denominations (which include the United Church of Christ) mostly have a 2–3% African American membership. There are also large numbers of Catholics, constituting 5% of the African American population. Of the total number of Jehovah's Witnesses, 22% are Black.

Some African Americans follow Islam. Historically, between 15 and 30% of enslaved Africans brought to the Americas were Muslims, but most of these Africans were converted to Christianity during the era of American slavery. During the twentieth century, some African Americans converted to Islam, mainly through the influence of Black nationalist groups that preached with distinctive Islamic practices; including the Moorish Science Temple of America, and the largest organization, the Nation of Islam, founded in the 1930s, which attracted at least 20,000 people by 1963. Prominent members included activist Malcolm X and boxer Muhammad Ali.

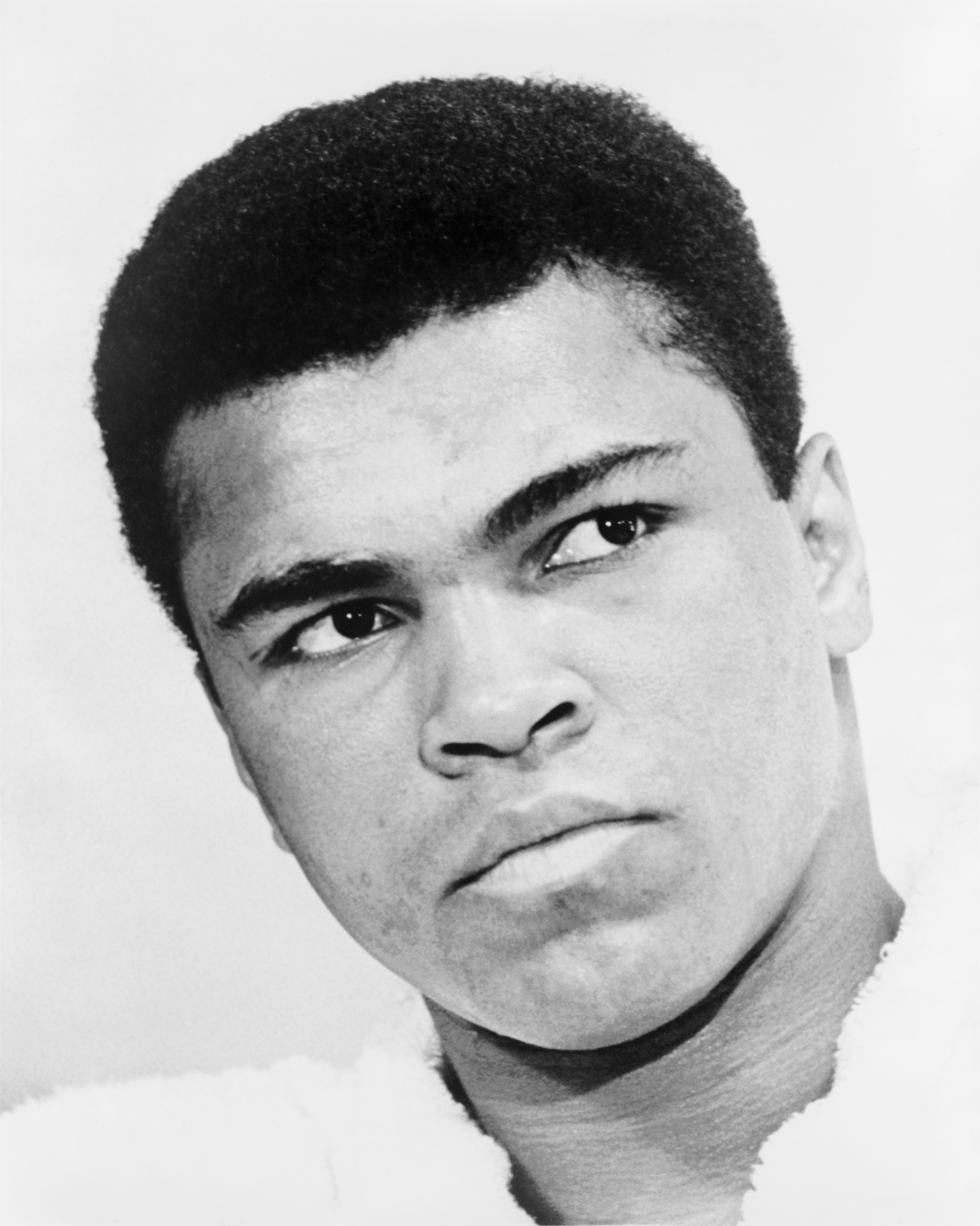
Muhammad Ali converted to Islam in 1964.

Malcolm X is considered the first person to start the movement among African Americans towards mainstream Islam, after he left the Nation and made the pilgrimage to Mecca. In 1975, Warith Deen Mohammed, the son of Elijah Muhammad took control of the Nation after his father's death and guided the majority of its members to orthodox Islam.

African American Muslims constitute 20% of the total US Muslim population, the majority are Sunni or orthodox Muslims, some of these identify under the community of W. Deen Mohammed. The Nation of Islam led by Louis Farrakhan has a membership ranging from 20,000 to 50,000 members.

There is also a small but growing group of African American Jews, making up less than 0.5% of African Americans or about 2% of the Jewish population in the United States. The majority of African-American Jews are Ashkenazi, while smaller numbers identify as Sephardi, Mizrahi, or other. Many African-American Jews are affiliated with denominations such as the Reform, Conservative, Reconstructionist, or Orthodox branches of Judaism, but the majority identify as "Jews of no religion", commonly known as secular Jews. A significant number of people who identify themselves as "Black Jews" are affiliated with syncretic religious groups, largely the Black Hebrew Israelites, whose beliefs include the claim that African Americans are descended from the Biblical Israelites. Jews of all races typically do not accept Black Hebrew Israelites as Jews, in part because they are usually not Jewish according to Jewish law, and in part because these groups are sometimes associated with antisemitism. African-American Jews have criticized the Black Hebrew Israelites, regarding the movement as primarily composed of Black non-Jews who have appropriated Black-Jewish identity.

In the 2010s, confirmed atheists were less than one half of one percent, similar to numbers for Hispanics.

In 2025, a Pew Research Center study found that, among Black Americans, Christian affiliation has declined in recent years. The share of Black adults identifying as Christian fell from 85% in 2007 to 79% in 2014 and 73% in 2021, mirroring a broader decline in Christianity in the United States. However, Black adults remain more likely than U.S. adults overall to identify as Christian (73% vs. 62%). About 4% of Black adults identify with non-Christian religions, mostly Islam, while 22% are religiously unaffiliated ("nones"), including 3% atheist or agnostic and 19% identifying as "nothing in particular." 58% say religion is very important in their lives, 64% pray daily, and 57% attend religious services at least monthly, whether in person or online. By comparison, about half or fewer adults in other racial or ethnic groups report that religion is very important or that they pray daily, and even smaller shares attend services monthly. Religiosity among Black Americans also varies by age. 39% of Black adults aged 65 and older describe themselves as very religious, compared with 21% of those under 30. This age pattern is similar to that observed among White and Hispanic Americans, although Black adults of all ages are more likely than other groups to describe themselves as very religious.

=== Sexuality ===
According to a Gallup survey, 4.6% of Black or African Americans self-identified as LGBT in 2016, while the total portion of American adults in all ethnic groups identifying as LGBT was 4.1% in 2016. African American women are more likely than African American men to openly identify as LGBT.

=== Health ===
==== General health ====
The life expectancy for Black men in 2008 was 70.8 years. Life expectancy for Black women was 77.5 years in 2008. In 1900, when information on Black life expectancy started being collated, a Black man could expect to live to 32.5 years and a Black woman 33.5 years. In 1900, White men lived an average of 46.3 years and White women lived an average of 48.3 years. African American life expectancy at birth is persistently five to seven years lower than European Americans. Black men have shorter lifespans than any other group in the US besides Native American men.

Black people have higher rates of obesity, diabetes, and hypertension than the US average. For adult Black men, the rate of obesity was 31.6% in 2010. For adult Black women, the rate of obesity was 41.2% in 2010. African Americans have higher rates of mortality than any other racial or ethnic group for eight of the top ten causes of death. In 2013, among men, Black men had the highest rate of getting cancer, followed by White, Hispanic, Asian/Pacific Islander (A/PI), and American Indian/Alaska Native (AI/AN) men. Among women, White women had the highest rate of getting cancer, followed by Black, Hispanic, Asian/Pacific Islander, and American Indian/Alaska Native women. African Americans also have higher prevalence and incidence of Alzheimer's disease compared to the overall average.

Black women lead the nation in abortions. According to a 2022 report, Black women made up 40% of abortions despite making up 13% of the U.S. woman population. African Americans are more likely than White Americans to die due to health-related problems developed by alcoholism. Alcohol abuse is the main contributor to the top three causes of death among African Americans.

In December 2020, African Americans were less likely to be vaccinated against COVID-19 due to mistrust in the US medical system. From 2021 to 2022, there was an increase in African Americans who became vaccinated. Still, in 2022, COVID-19 complications became the third leading cause of death for African Americans.

Violence is a major problem within the African American community. A report from the US Department of Justice states "In 2005, homicide victimization rates for Blacks were more than six times as high as the rates for Whites". The report also found that "94% of Black victims were killed by Blacks." Of the nearly 20,000 recorded US homicides in 2022, African Americans made up the majority of offenders and victims despite making up less than 15% of the population. In 2024, all of the five most dangerous US cities have a significant Black population and highly concerning Black-on-Black violent crime rate. Black males age 15–44 are the only race/sex category for which homicide is a top-five cause of death. Black women are three times more likely to be killed by an intimate partner than White women. Black children are more than three times as likely to die due to parental abuse and neglect than White children.

==== Sexual health ====
According to the Centers for Disease Control and Prevention, African Americans have higher rates of sexually transmitted infections (STIs) compared to Whites, with five times the rates of syphilis and chlamydia, and 7.5 times the rate of gonorrhea.

The disproportionately high incidence of HIV/AIDS among African Americans has been attributed to homophobic influences, lack of condom usage, and lack of proper healthcare. The prevalence of HIV/AIDS among Black men is seven times higher than the prevalence for White men, and Black men are more than nine times as likely to die from HIV/AIDS-related illness than White men. The prevalence of HIV/AIDS among Black women is 20 times higher than White women, and Black women are more than 15 times as likely to die from HIV/AIDS-related illness than White women.

==== Mental health ====
African Americans have several barriers for accessing mental health services. Counseling has been frowned upon and distant in utility and proximity to many people in the African American community. In 2004, a qualitative research study explored the disconnect with African Americans and mental health. The study was conducted as a semi-structured discussion which allowed the focus group to express their opinions and life experiences. The results revealed a couple key variables that create barriers for many African American communities to seek mental health services such as the stigma, lack of four important necessities; trust, affordability, cultural understanding and impersonal services.

Historically, many African American communities did not seek counseling because religion was a part of the family values. African Americans who have a faith background are more likely to seek prayer as a coping mechanism for mental issues rather than seeking professional mental health services. In 2015 a study concluded, African Americans with high value in religion are less likely to utilize mental health services compared to those who have low value in religion.

In the United States, counseling approaches are based on the experience of White Americans and do not fit within the African American culture. African American families tend to resolve concerns within the family, and it is viewed by the family as a strength. On the other hand, when African Americans seek counseling, they face a social backlash and are criticized. They may be labeled "crazy", viewed as weak, and their pride is diminished. Because of this, many African Americans instead seek mentorship within communities they trust.

Terminology is another barrier in relation to African Americans and mental health. There is more stigma on the term psychotherapy versus counseling. In one study, psychotherapy is associated with mental illness whereas counseling approaches problem-solving, guidance and help. More African Americans seek assistance when it is called counseling and not psychotherapy because it is more welcoming within the culture and community. Counselors are encouraged to be aware of such barriers for the well-being of African American clients. Without cultural competency training in health care, many African Americans go unheard and misunderstood.

In 2021, African Americans had the third highest suicide rate trailing American Indians/Alaska Natives and White Americans. However, African Americans had the second highest increase of its suicide rate from 2011 to 2021, growing 58%. As of 2024, suicide is the second leading cause of death among African-Americans between the ages of 15 and 24, with Black men being four times more likely to kill themselves than Black women.

== Genetics ==
=== Genome-wide studies ===
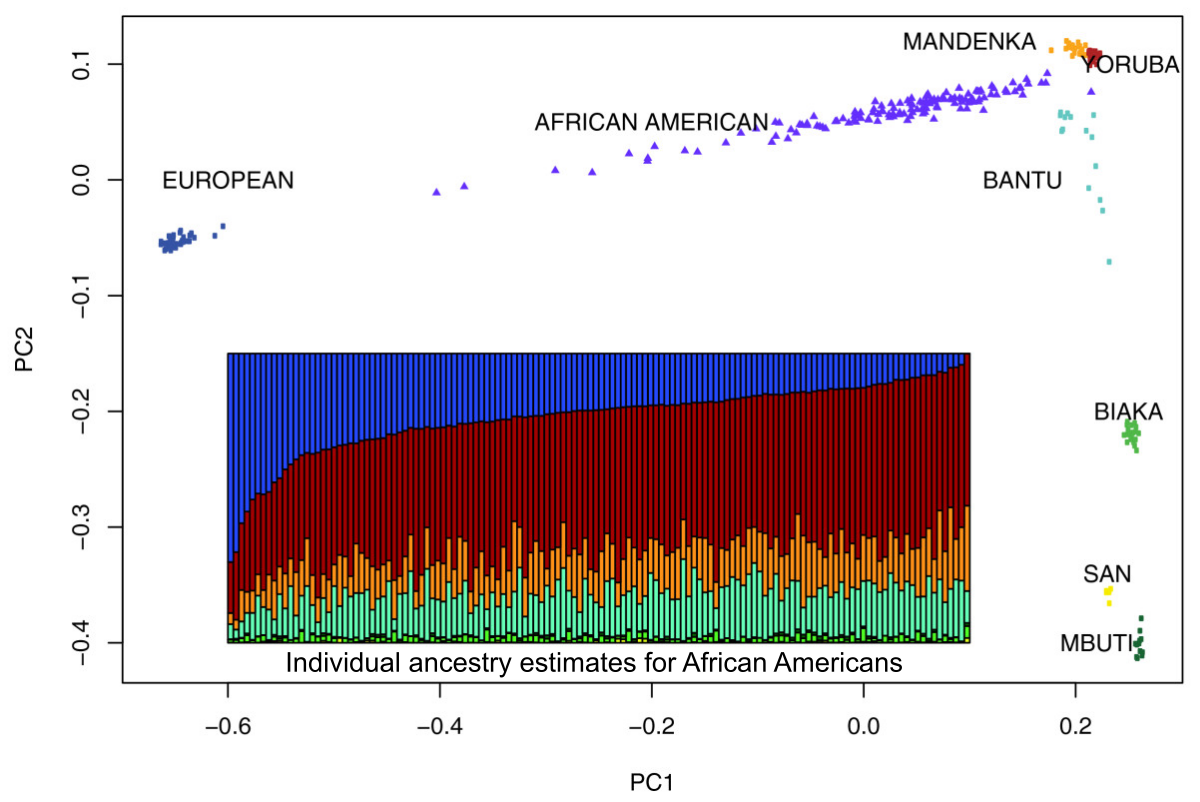
Genetic clustering of 128 African Americans, by Zakharia et al. (2009). Each vertical bar represents an individual. The color scheme of the bar plot matches that in the PCA plot.

Recent studies of African Americans using genetic testing have found ancestry to vary by region and sex of ancestors. These studies found that on average, African Americans have 73.2–82.1% Sub-Saharan African, 16.7–24% European, and 0.8–1.2% Native American genetic ancestry, with large variation between individuals. Commercial testing services have reported similar variation, with ranges from 0.6 to 2 percent Native American, 19 to 29 percent European, and 65 to 80 percent Sub-Saharan African ancestry.

According to a genome-wide study by Bryc et al. (2009), the mixed ancestry of African Americans in varying ratios came about as the result of sexual contact between West/Central Africans (more frequently females) and Europeans (more frequently males). This can be understood as most commonly being the result of enslaved African American females being raped by White males. Consequently, the 365 African Americans in their sample have a genome-wide average of 78.1% West African ancestry and 18.5% European ancestry, with large variation among individuals (ranging from 99% to 1% West African ancestry). The West African ancestral component in African Americans is most similar to that in present-day speakers from the non-Bantu branches of the Niger-Congo family. (Note: DNA studies of African-Americans have determined that they primarily descend from various Niger-Congo-speaking West/Central African ethnic groups: Akan (including the Ashanti and Fante subgroups), Balanta, Bamileke, Bamun, Bariba, Biafara, Bran, Chokwe, Dagomba, Edo, Ewe, Fon, Fula, Ga, Gurma, Hausa, Ibibio (including the Efik subgroup), Igbo, Igala, Ijaw (including the Kalabari subgroup), Itsekiri, Jola, Luchaze, Lunda, Kpele, Kru, Mahi, Mandinka (including the Mende subgroup), Naulu, Serer, Susu, Temne, Tikar, Wolof, Yaka, Yoruba, and Bantu peoples; specifically the Duala, Kongo, Luba, Mbundu (including the Ovimbundu subgroup) and Teke.)

Correspondingly, Montinaro et al. (2014) observed that around 50% of the overall ancestry of African Americans traces comes from a population similar to the Niger-Congo-speaking Yoruba of southern Nigeria and southern Benin, reflecting the centrality of this West African region in the Atlantic slave trade. The next most frequent ancestral component found among African Americans was derived from Great Britain, in keeping with historical records. It constitutes a little over 10% of their overall ancestry and is most similar to the Northwest European ancestral component also carried by Barbadians. Zakharia et al. (2009) found a similar proportion of Yoruba-like ancestry in their African American samples, with a minority also drawn from Mandenka and Bantu populations. Additionally, the researchers observed an average European ancestry of 21.9%, again with significant variation between individuals. Bryc et al. (2009) note that populations from other parts of the continent may also constitute adequate proxies for the ancestors of some African American individuals; namely, ancestral populations from Guinea Bissau, Senegal and Sierra Leone in West Africa and Angola in Southern Africa. An individual African American person can have over fifteen African ethnic groups in their genetic makeup alone due to the slave trade covering such vast areas.

Altogether, genetic studies suggest that African Americans are a genetically diverse people. According to DNA analysis led in 2006 by Penn State geneticist Mark D. Shriver, around 58 percent of African Americans have at least 12.5% European ancestry (equivalent to one European great-grandparent and their forebears), 19.6 percent of African Americans have at least 25% European ancestry (equivalent to one European grandparent and their forebears), and one percent of African Americans have at least 50% European ancestry (equivalent to one European parent and their forebears). According to Shriver, around five percent of African Americans also have at least 12.5% Native American ancestry (equivalent to one Native American great-grandparent and their forebears). Research suggests that Native American ancestry among people who identify as African American is a result of relationships that occurred soon after slave ships arrived in the American colonies, and European ancestry is of more recent origin, often from the decades before the Civil War.

=== Y-DNA ===
Africans bearing the E-V38 (E1b1a) likely traversed across the Sahara, from east to west, approximately 19,000 years ago. E-M2 (E1b1a1) likely originated in West Africa or Central Africa. According to a Y-DNA study by Sims et al. (2007), the majority (≈60%) of African Americans belong to various subclades of the E-M2 (E1b1a1, formerly E3a) paternal haplogroup. This is the most common genetic paternal lineage found today among West/Central African males and is also a signature of the historical Bantu migrations. The next most frequent Y-DNA haplogroup observed among African Americans is the R1b clade, which around 15% of African Americans carry. This lineage is most common today among Northwestern European males. The remaining African Americans mainly belong to the paternal haplogroup I (≈7%), which is also frequent in Northwestern Europe.

=== mtDNA ===
According to an mtDNA study by Salas et al. (2005), the maternal lineages of African Americans are most similar to haplogroups that are today especially common in West Africa (>55%), followed closely by West-Central Africa and Southwestern Africa (<41%). The characteristic West African haplogroups L1b, L2b,c,d, and L3b,d and West-Central African haplogroups L1c and L3e in particular occur at high frequencies among African Americans. As with the paternal DNA of African Americans, contributions from other parts of the continent to their maternal gene pool are insignificant.

== Racism and social status ==
Formal political, economic and social discrimination against minorities has been present throughout American history. Leland T. Saito, Associate Professor of Sociology and American Studies & Ethnicity at the University of Southern California, writes, "Political rights have been circumscribed by race, class and gender since the founding of the United States, when the right to vote was restricted to White men of property. Throughout the history of the United States, race has been used by Whites for legitimizing and creating difference and social, economic and political exclusion."

Those who economically gained the most from slavery were the planter class, owners of large-scale plantations where large numbers of enslaved Africans were held captive and forced to produce crops to create wealth for a White elite. Having a prominent role in politics with eight presidents owning slaves while in office, upon the end of the Civil War the planter class kept control of their land and remained politically influential, with the London School of Economics stating, "this persistence in "de facto power" in turn allowed them to block economic reforms, disenfranchise Black voters, and restrict the mobility of workers."

Although they have gained a greater degree of social equality since the civil rights movement, African Americans have remained stagnant economically, which has hindered their ability to break into the middle class and beyond. As of 2020, the racial wealth gap between Whites and Blacks remains as large as it was in 1968, with the typical net worth of a White household equivalent to that of 11.5 Black households. Despite this, African Americans have increased employment rates and gained representation in the highest levels of American government in the post–civil rights era. However, widespread racism remains an issue that continues to undermine the development of social status.

Economically, of all the racially Black ethnic groups on the globe, African Americans are the wealthiest and most successful, with one in every fifty African American families being millionaires. This equates in 2023 to approximately 1.79 million African American millionaires in the United States, which is more than the number of millionaires in any racially Black country, and many other countries, around the world.

=== Policing and criminal justice ===
In the US, which has the largest per-capita prison population in the world, African Americans are overrepresented as the second-largest population of prison inmates (38%) in 2023, coming second to Whites, who made up 57% of the prison population. According to the National Registry of Exonerations, Blacks are roughly 7.5 times more likely to be wrongfully convicted of murder in the US than Whites. In 2012, the New York City Police Department detained people more than 500,000 times under the city's stop-and-frisk law. Of the total detained, 55% were African-Americans, while Black people made up 20% of the city's population.

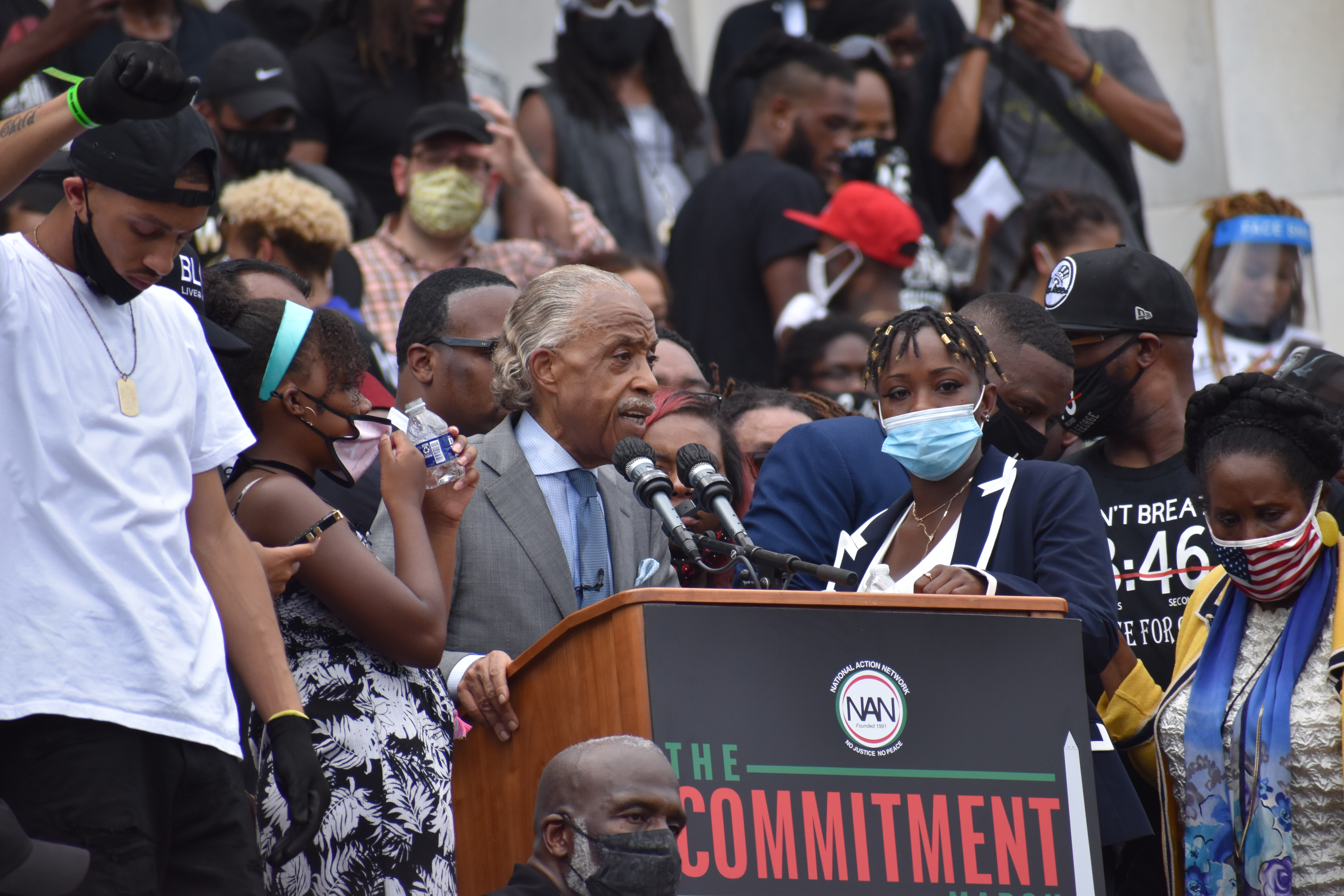
Al Sharpton led the Commitment March: Get Your Knee Off Our Necks protest on August 28, 2020.

African American males are more likely to be killed by police when compared to other races. This is one of the factors that led to the creation of the Black Lives Matter movement in 2013. A historical issue in the US where women have weaponized their White privilege in the country by reporting on Black people, often instigating racial violence, difficult White women—who have been given a different name over the centuries by African Americans—calling the police on Black people became widely publicized in 2020. According to The Guardian, "The specter of Karen persisted as Black Lives Matter protests and civil unrest spread around the country following Floyd's murder and reckonings with racism began to roil institutions, toppling careers as well as statues".

In the aftermath of the peak Black Lives Matter protests and widespread police reform efforts in the early 2020s, crime rates surged across the nation, especially in predominantly Black neighborhoods. Many cities experienced near-record or record levels of violence and other criminal activity. As a result, numerous municipalities scaled back police reform initiatives and increased funding for law enforcement.

=== Social issues ===
After over 50 years, marriage rates for all Americans began to decline while divorce rates and out-of-wedlock births have climbed. These changes have been greatest among African Americans. After more than 70 years of racial parity Black marriage rates began to fall behind Whites. Single-parent households have become most common, and according to US census figures released in January 2010, only 38% of Black children lived with both their parents. In 2021, statistics show that over 80% marriages in the African American ethnic group marry within their ethnic group.

Black children are overrepresented in the U.S. foster care system. In 2017, Black American children made up 14% of the children population but 22% of those in the foster care system. Black American children are more than twice as likely to be placed in foster care than White American children.

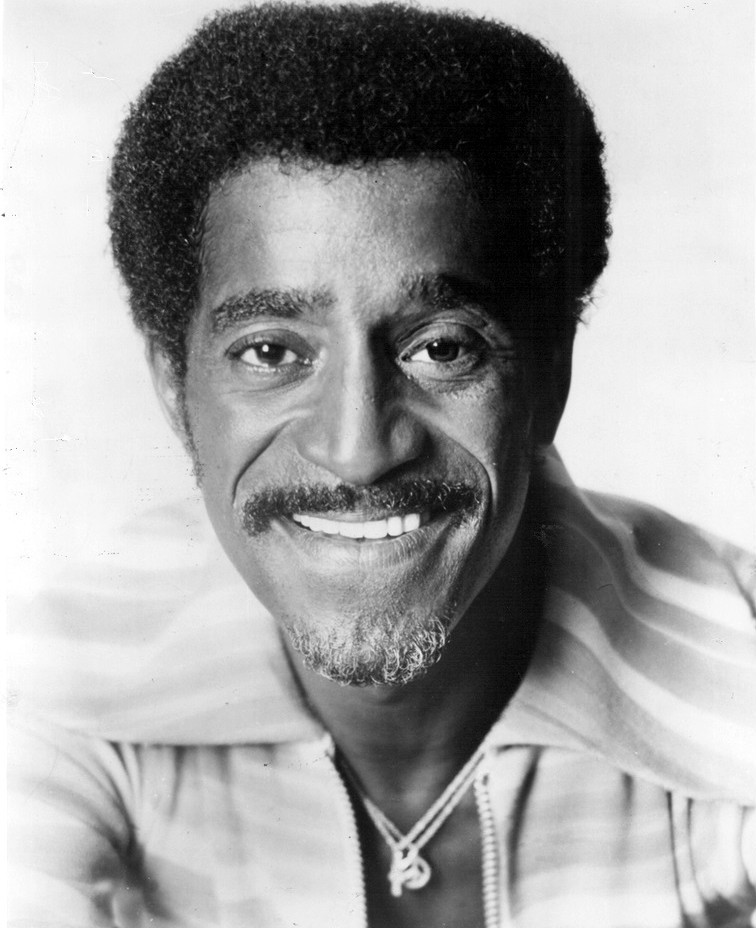
Although the ban on interracial marriage ended in California in 1948, entertainer Sammy Davis Jr. faced a backlash for his involvement with a White woman in 1957.

The first ever anti-miscegenation law was passed by the Maryland General Assembly in 1691, criminalizing interracial marriage. In a speech in Charleston, Illinois in 1858, Abraham Lincoln stated, "I am not, nor ever have been in favor of making voters or jurors of negroes, nor of qualifying them to hold office, nor to intermarry with white people". By the late 1800s, 38 US states had anti-miscegenation statutes. By 1924, the ban on interracial marriage was still in force in 29 states. While interracial marriage had been legal in California since 1948, in 1957 actor Sammy Davis Jr. faced a backlash for his involvement with White actress Kim Novak. Harry Cohn, the president of Columbia Pictures, with whom Novak was under contract, gave in to his concerns that a racist backlash against the relationship could hurt the studio. Davis briefly married Black dancer Loray White in 1958 to protect himself from mob violence. Inebriated at the wedding ceremony, Davis despairingly said to his best friend, Arthur Silber Jr., "Why won't they let me live my life?" The couple never lived together, and commenced divorce proceedings in September 1958. In 1958, officers in Virginia entered the home of Mildred and Richard Loving and dragged them out of bed for living together as an interracial couple, on the basis that "any white person intermarry with a colored person"—or vice versa—each party "shall be guilty of a felony" and face prison terms of five years. In 1967 the law was ruled unconstitutional (via the 14th Amendment adopted in 1868) by the US Supreme Court in Loving v. Virginia.

In 2008, Democrats overwhelmingly voted 70% against California Proposition 8, African Americans voted 58% in favor of it while 42% voted against Proposition 8. On May 9, 2012, Barack Obama, the first Black president, became the first US president to support same-sex marriage. Since Obama's endorsement there has been a rapid growth in support for same-sex marriage among African Americans. As of 2012, 59% of African Americans support same-sex marriage, which is higher than support among the national average (53%) and White Americans (50%).

Polls in North Carolina, Pennsylvania, Missouri, Maryland, Ohio, Florida, and Nevada have also shown an increase in support for same sex marriage among African Americans. On November 6, 2012, Maryland, Maine, and Washington all voted for approve of same-sex marriage, along with Minnesota rejecting a constitutional amendment banning same-sex marriage. Exit polls in Maryland show about 50% of African Americans voted for same-sex marriage, showing a vast evolution among African Americans on the issue and was crucial in helping pass same-sex marriage in Maryland.

Black Americans hold far more conservative opinions on abortion, extramarital sex, and raising children out of wedlock than Democrats as a whole. On financial issues, however, African Americans are in line with Democrats, generally supporting a more progressive tax structure to provide more government spending on social services.

=== Political legacy ===
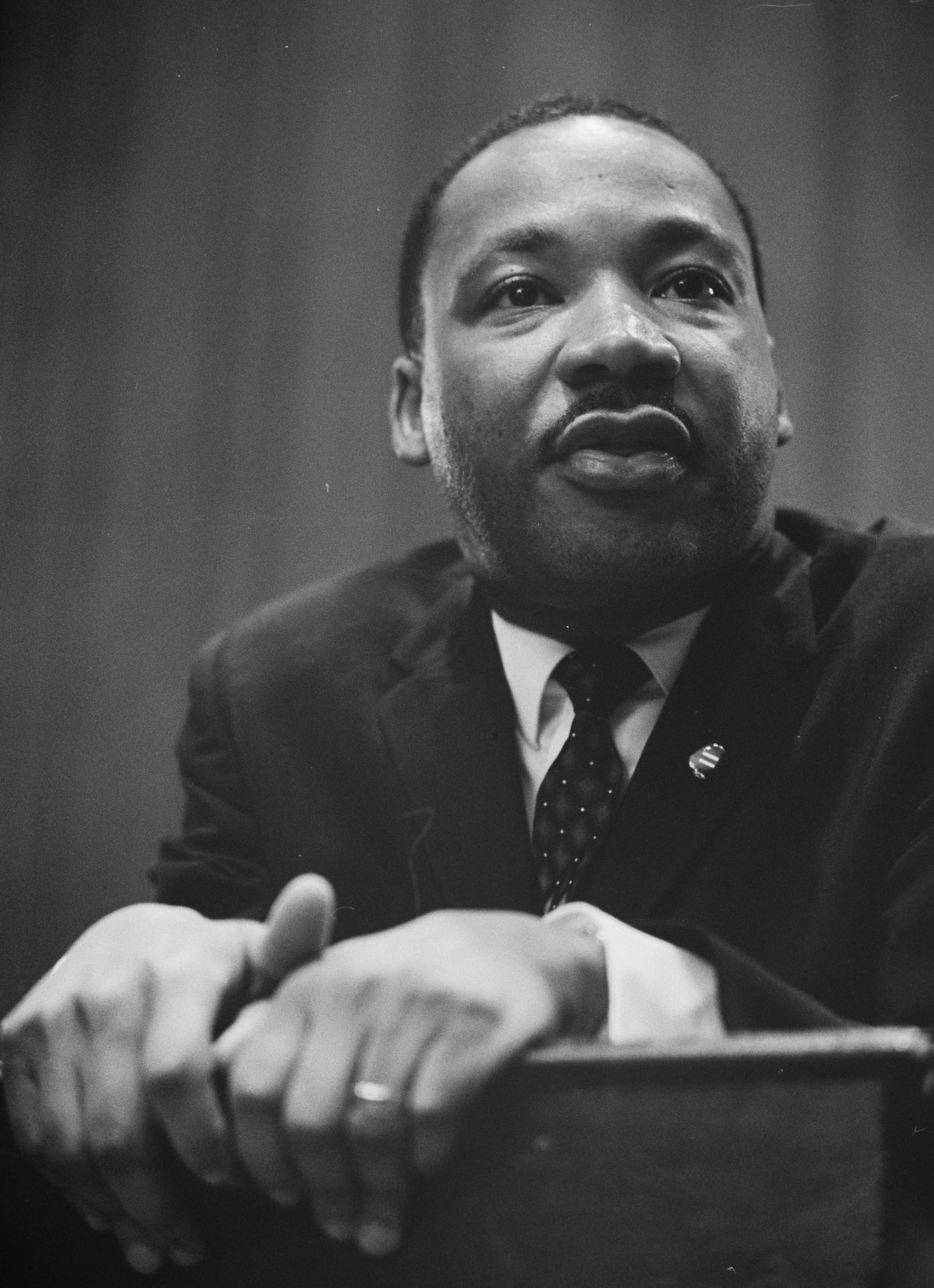
Dr. Martin Luther King Jr. remains the most prominent political leader in the American civil rights movement and perhaps the most influential African American political figure in general.

African Americans have fought in every war in the history of the United States.

The gains made by African Americans in the civil rights movement and in the Black Power movement not only obtained certain rights for African Americans but changed American society in far-reaching and fundamentally important ways. Prior to the 1950s, Black Americans in the South were subject to de jure discrimination, or Jim Crow laws. They were often the victims of extreme cruelty and violence, sometimes resulting in deaths: by the post World War II era, African Americans became increasingly discontented with their long-standing inequality. In the words of Martin Luther King Jr., African Americans and their supporters challenged the nation to "rise up and live out the true meaning of its creed that all men are created equal ..."

The civil rights movement marked an enormous change in American social, political, economic and civic life. It brought with it boycotts, sit-ins, nonviolent demonstrations and marches, court battles, bombings and other violence; prompted worldwide media coverage and intense public debate; forged enduring civic, economic and religious alliances; and disrupted and realigned the nation's two major political parties.

Over time, it has changed in fundamental ways the manner in which Blacks and Whites interact with and relate to one another. The movement resulted in the removal of codified, de jure racial segregation and discrimination from American life and law, and heavily influenced other groups and movements in struggles for civil rights and social equality within American society, including the Free Speech Movement, the disabled, the women's movement, and migrant workers. It also inspired the Native American rights movement, and in King's 1964 book Why We Can't Wait he wrote the US "was born in genocide when it embraced the doctrine that the original American, the Indian, was an inferior race."

== Media and coverage ==
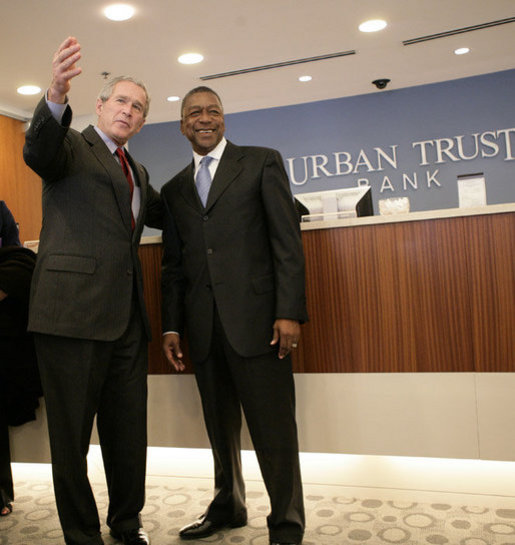
BET founder Robert L. Johnson with former US President George W. Bush

Some activists and academics contend that American news media coverage of African American news, concerns, or dilemmas is inadequate, or that the news media present distorted images of African Americans.

To combat this, Robert L. Johnson founded Black Entertainment Television (BET), a network that targets young African Americans and urban audiences in the United States. Over the years, the network has aired such programming as rap and R&B music videos, urban-oriented movies and television series, and some public affairs programs. On Sunday mornings, BET would broadcast Christian programming; the network would also broadcast non-affiliated Christian programs during the early morning hours daily. According to Viacom, BET is now a global network that reaches households in the United States, Caribbean, Canada, and the United Kingdom. The network has gone on to spawn several spin-off channels, including BET Her (originally launched as BET on Jazz).

Another network targeting African Americans is TV One. TV One is owned by Urban One, founded and controlled by Catherine Hughes. Urban One is one of the nation's largest radio broadcasting companies and the largest African American-owned radio broadcasting company in the United States.

In June 2009, NBC News launched a new website named TheGrio. It is the first African American video news site that focuses on underrepresented stories in existing national news.

=== Black-owned and oriented media outlets ===
- The Africa Channel – Dedicated to programming about African culture.
- aspireTV – a digital cable and satellite channel owned by businessman and former basketball player Magic Johnson.
- ATTV – an independent public affairs and educational channel.
- BET Media Group – The most prominent multimedia outlet targeting Afro-Americans.
  - BET
  - BET Her
  - VH1 – Originally a MTV spin-off focused on light genres of music, the network's programming became slanted towards African American culture during the 2010s.
- Bounce TV – a digital multicast network owned by the E. W. Scripps Company.
- Fox Soul – a digital television and streaming network primarily airing original talk shows and syndicated programming
- Oprah Winfrey Network – a cable and satellite network founded by Oprah Winfrey and jointly owned by Warner Bros. Discovery and Harpo Studios. While not exclusively targeting African Americans, much of its original programming is geared towards a similar demographic.
- Revolt – a music channel and media company founded by Sean "Puff Daddy" Combs.
- Soul of the South Network – a regional broadcast network.
- TheGrio – a digital multicast network focused on news and opinion-based programming.
- TV One – a general entertainment network targeting adults.
  - Cleo TV – a sister network targeting millennial and Generation X women
- We TV – Owned by AMC Networks, became slanted towards Black women during the 2010s

== Culture ==
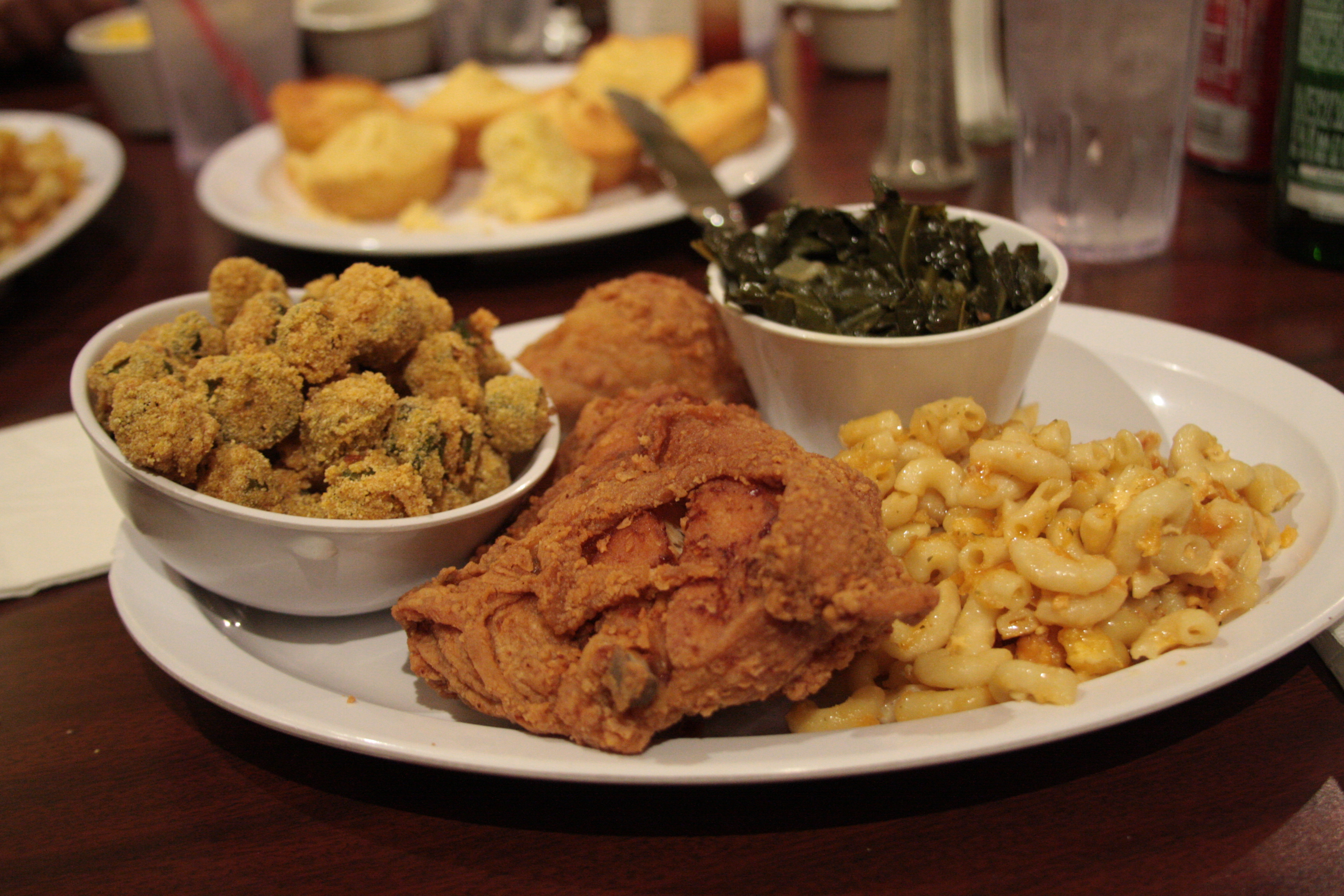
A traditional soul food dinner consisting of fried chicken with macaroni and cheese, collard greens, breaded fried okra, and cornbread

From their earliest presence in North America, African Americans have significantly contributed literature, art, agricultural skills, cuisine, clothing styles, music, language, and social and technological innovation to American culture. The cultivation and use of many agricultural products in the United States, such as yams, peanuts, rice, okra, sorghum, grits, watermelon, indigo dyes, and cotton, can be traced to West African and African American influences. Notable examples include George Washington Carver, who created nearly 500 products from peanuts, sweet potatoes, and pecans. Soul food is a variety of cuisine popular among African Americans. It is closely related to the cuisine of the Southern United States. The descriptive terminology may have originated in the mid-1960s, when soul was a common definer used to describe African American culture (for example, soul music). African Americans were the first peoples in the United States to make fried chicken, along with Scottish immigrants to the South. Although the Scottish had been frying chicken before they emigrated, they lacked the spices and flavor that African Americans had used when preparing the meal. The Scottish American settlers therefore adopted the African American method of seasoning chicken. However, fried chicken was generally a rare meal in the African American community and was usually reserved for special events or celebrations.

=== Language ===
African-American English is a variety (dialect, ethnolect, and sociolect) of American English, commonly spoken by urban working-class and largely bi-dialectal middle-class African Americans. It shares parts of its grammar and phonology with the Southern American English dialect. African American English differs from Standard American English (SAE) in certain pronunciation characteristics, tense usage, and grammatical structures, which were derived from West African languages (particularly those belonging to the Niger–Congo family).

Virtually all habitual speakers of African American English can understand and communicate in Standard American English. As with all linguistic forms, AAVE's usage is influenced by various factors, including geographical, educational and socioeconomic background, as well as formality of setting. Additionally, there are many literary uses of this variety of English, particularly in African American literature.

Other languages are spoken by specific sub-communities. The Gullah language is an English-based creole language spoken mostly in the coastal regions of South Carolina and Georgia by the Gullah; an off-shoot of this is Afro-Seminole Creole spoken by Black Seminoles mostly now in Mexico and Brackettville, Texas. Louisiana Creole is a French-based creole and spoken mostly in Louisiana.

==== Traditional names ====
African-American names are part of the cultural traditions of African Americans, most of these cultural names having no connection to Africa but strictly an African American cultural practice that developed in the United States during enslavement. This new evidence became apparent by census records which show African Americans and White Americans, though they spoke the same language, chose to use different names even during times of enslavement, which is where and when the development of African American cultural names began.

Prior to this newer information, it was only thought that before the 1950s, and 1960s, most African-American names closely resembled those used within European-American culture. Babies of that era were generally given a few common names, with children using nicknames to distinguish the various people with the same name. With the rise of 1960s civil rights movement, there was a dramatic increase in names of various origins.

By the 1970s, and 1980s, it had become common among African Americans to invent new names for themselves, although many of these invented names took elements from popular existing names. Prefixes such as La/Le, Da/De, Ra/Re and Ja/Je, and suffixes like -ique/iqua, -isha and -aun/-awn are common, as are inventive spellings for common names. The book Baby Names Now: From Classic to Cool—The Very Last Word on First Names places the origins of "La" names in African-American culture in New Orleans.

Even with the rise of inventive names, it is still common for African Americans to use biblical, historical, or traditional European names. Daniel, Christopher, Michael, David, James, Joseph, and Matthew were thus among the most frequent names for African-American boys in 2013.

The name LaKeisha is typically considered American in origin but has elements that were drawn from both French and West/Central African roots. Names such as LaTanisha, JaMarcus, DeAndre, and Shaniqua were created in the same way. Punctuation marks are seen more often within African American names than other American names, such as the names Mo'nique and D'Andre.

=== Music ===
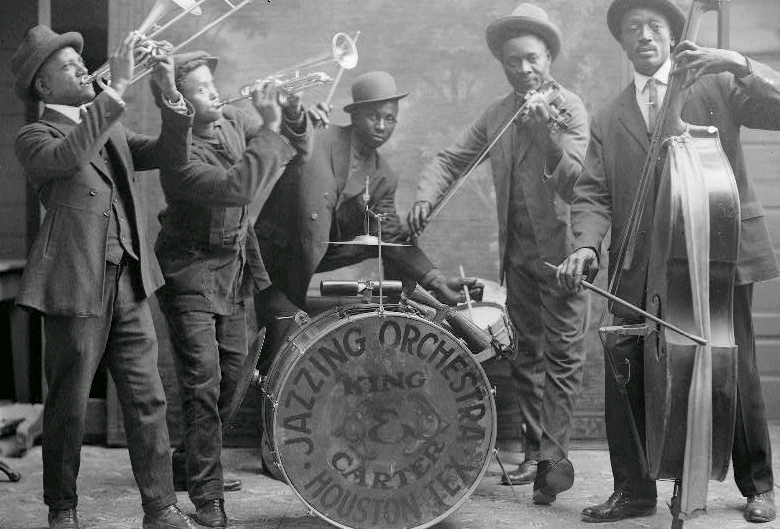
The King & Carter Jazzing Orchestra photographed in Houston, Texas, January 1921

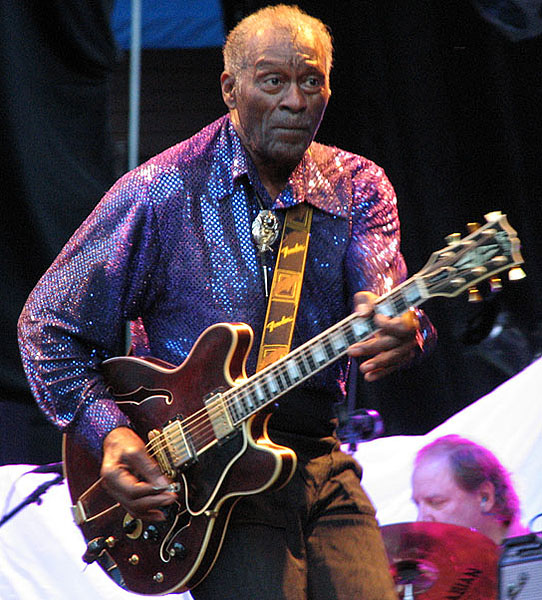
Chuck Berry is considered a pioneer of rock and roll.

African American music is one of the most pervasive African American cultural influences in the United States today and is among the most dominant in mainstream popular music. Hip-hop, R&B, funk, rock and roll, soul, blues, and other contemporary American musical forms originated in Black communities and evolved from other Black forms of music, including blues, doo-wop, barbershop, ragtime, bluegrass, jazz, and gospel music.

African American-derived musical forms have also influenced and been incorporated into virtually every other popular music genre in the world, including country and techno. African American genres are the most important ethnic vernacular tradition in America, as they have developed independent of African traditions from which they arise more so than any other immigrant groups, including Europeans; make up the broadest and longest lasting range of styles in America; and have, historically, been more influential, interculturally, geographically, and economically, than other American vernacular traditions.

=== Dance ===
African Americans have also had an important role in American dance. Bill T. Jones, a prominent modern choreographer and dancer, has included historical African American themes in his work, particularly in the piece "Last Supper at Uncle Tom's Cabin/The Promised Land". Likewise, Alvin Ailey's artistic work, including his "Revelations" based on his experience growing up as an African American in the South during the 1930s, has had a significant influence on modern dance. Another form of dance, stepping, is an African American tradition whose performance and competition has been formalized through the traditionally Black fraternities and sororities at universities.

=== Sports ===
Discussions of race and sports in the United States, where the two subjects have always been intertwined in American history, have focused to a great extent on African Americans. Depending on the type of sport and performance level, African Americans are reported to be over- or under-represented. African Americans compose the highest percentage of the minority groups active at the professional level, but are among those who show the lowest participation overall. And though the list of African Americans in professional sports remains high, it only represents a small fraction of aspiring black athletes.

=== Literature and academics ===
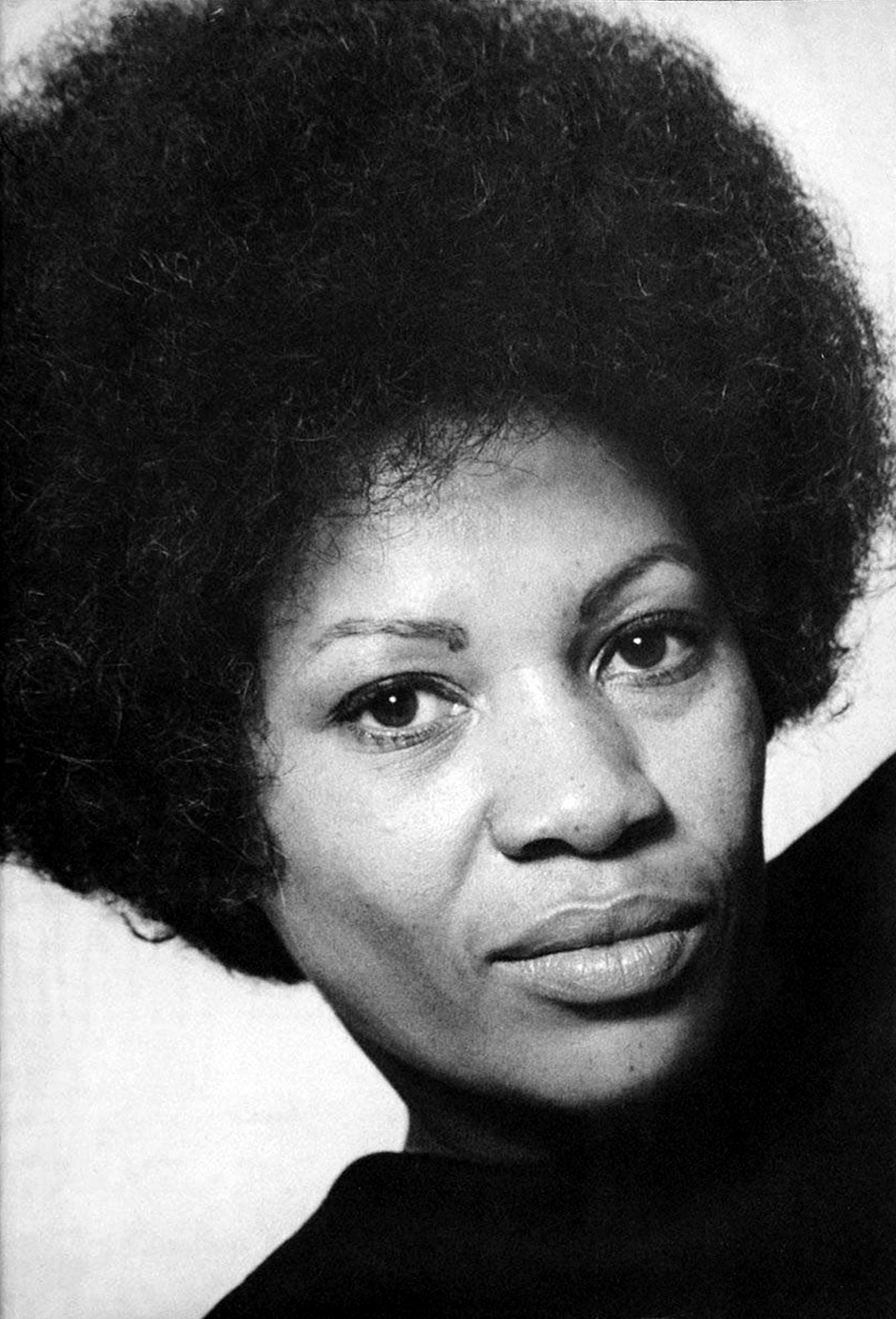
Toni Morrison, recipient of the Nobel Prize for literature

Many African American authors have written stories, poems, and essays influenced by their experiences as African Americans. African American literature is a major genre in American literature. Famous examples include Langston Hughes, James Baldwin, Richard Wright, Zora Neale Hurston, Ralph Ellison, Nobel Prize winner Toni Morrison, and Maya Angelou.

African American inventors have created many widely used devices in the world and have contributed to international innovation. Norbert Rillieux created the technique for converting sugar cane juice into white sugar crystals. Moreover, Rillieux left Louisiana in 1854 and went to France, where he spent ten years working with the Champollions deciphering Egyptian hieroglyphics from the Rosetta Stone. Most slave inventors were nameless, such as the slave owned by the Confederate President Jefferson Davis who designed the ship propeller used by the Confederate navy.

By 1913, over 1,000 inventions were patented by Black Americans. Among the most notable inventors were Jan Matzeliger, who developed the first machine to mass-produce shoes, and Elijah McCoy, who invented automatic lubrication devices for steam engines. Granville Woods had 35 patents to improve electric railway systems, including the first system to allow moving trains to communicate. Garrett A. Morgan developed the first automatic traffic signal and gas mask.

Lewis Howard Latimer invented an improvement for the incandescent light bulb. More recent inventors include Frederick McKinley Jones, who invented the movable refrigeration unit for food transport in trucks and trains. Lloyd Quarterman worked with six other Black scientists on the creation of the atomic bomb (code named the Manhattan Project) and helped develop the first nuclear reactor.

As part of the preservation of their culture, African Americans have continuously launched their own publications and publishing houses, such as Robert Sengstacke Abbott, founder of the Chicago Defender newspaper, and Carter G. Woodson, the founder of Black History Month who spent over thirty years documenting and publishing African American history in journals and books. The Johnson Publishing Company, founded by John H. Johnson in 1942, is a National Historic Landmark.

== Terminology ==
=== General ===
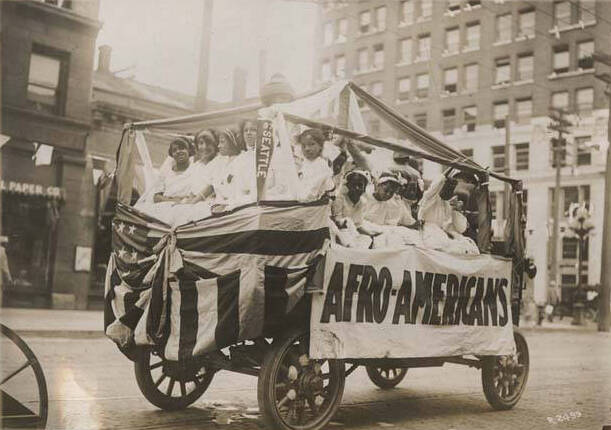
This parade float displayed the word "Afro-Americans" in 1911.

The term African American was popularized by Jesse Jackson in the 1980s, although there are recorded uses from the 18th and 19th centuries, for example, in post-emancipation holidays and conferences. Earlier terms also used to describe Americans of African ancestry referred more to skin color than to ancestry. Other terms (such as colored, person of color, or negro) were included in the wording of various laws and legal decisions which some thought were being used as tools of White supremacy and oppression.

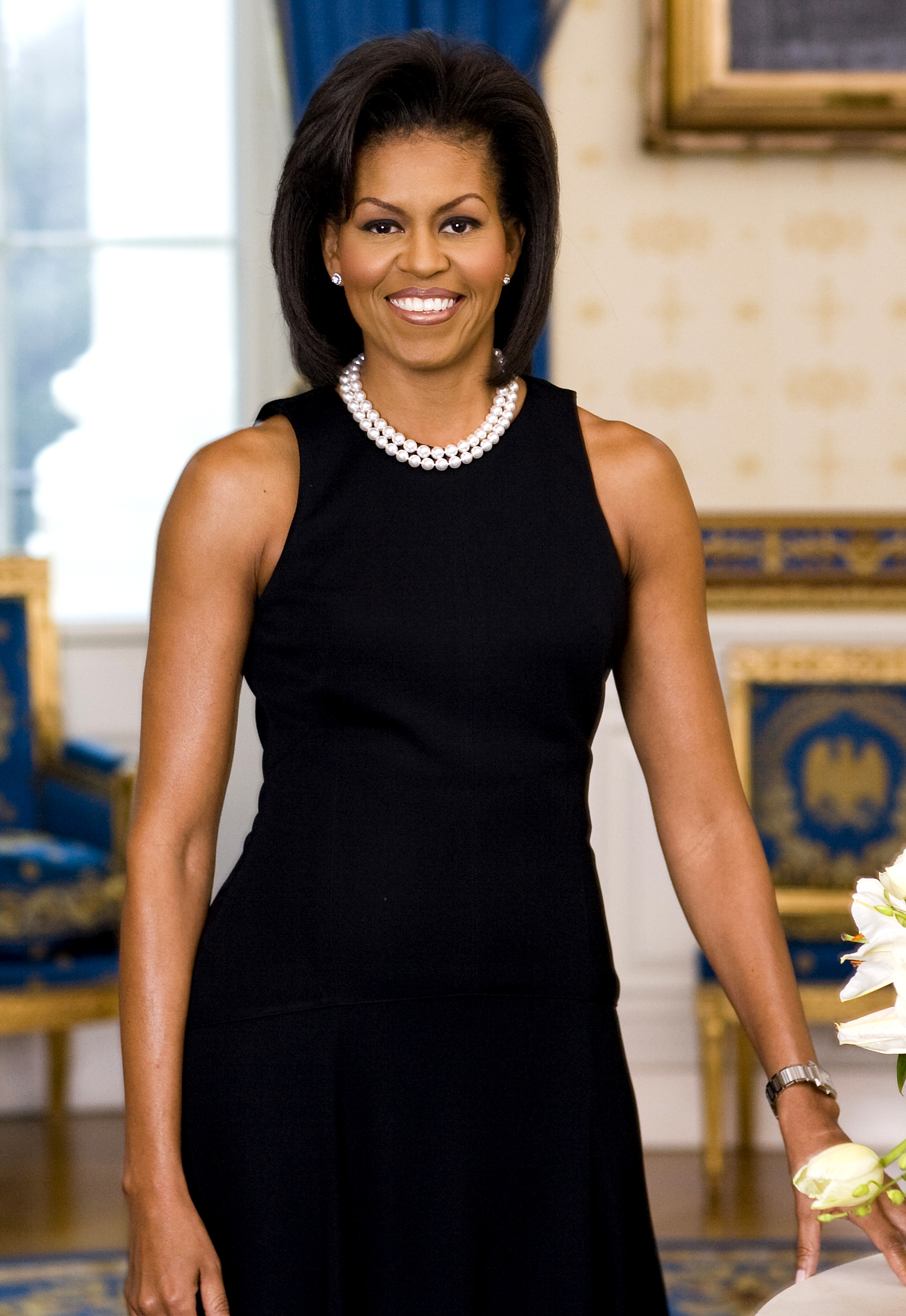
Michelle Obama was the First Lady of the United States; she and her husband, President Barack Obama, are the first African Americans to hold these positions.

A 16-page pamphlet entitled "A Sermon on the Capture of Lord Cornwallis" is notable for the attribution of its authorship to "An African American". Published in 1782, the book's use of this phrase predates any other yet identified by more than 50 years.

In the 1980s, the term African American was advanced to give descendants of American slaves, and other American Blacks who lived through the slavery era, a heritage and a cultural base. The term was popularized in Black communities around the country via word of mouth and ultimately received mainstream use after Jesse Jackson's use in 1988. Subsequently, major media outlets adopted it.

Surveys in the 1990s and the first decade of the 21st century showed that the majority of Black Americans had no preference for African American versus Black American, although they had a slight preference for the latter in personal settings and the former in more formal settings. By 2021, according to polling from Gallup, 58% of Black Americans expressed no preference for what their group should be called, with 17% each preferring Black and African-American. Among those with no preference, Gallup found a slight majority favored Black "if [they] had to choose."

In 2020, the Associated Press updated its AP Stylebook to direct its writers to capitalize the first letter of Black when it is used "in a racial, ethnic or cultural sense, conveying an essential and shared sense of history, identity and community among people who identify as Black, including those in the African diaspora and within Africa." The New York Times and other outlets made similar changes at the same time.

In 2023, the government released a new more detailed breakdown due to the rise in racially Black immigration into the US, listing African American as a compound termed ethnicity, distinguished from other racially Black ethnicities such as Nigerian, Jamaican etc.

The term African American embraces pan-Africanism as earlier enunciated by prominent African thinkers such as Marcus Garvey, W. E. B. Du Bois, and George Padmore. The term Afro-Usonian, and variations of such, are more rarely used.

=== Official identity ===
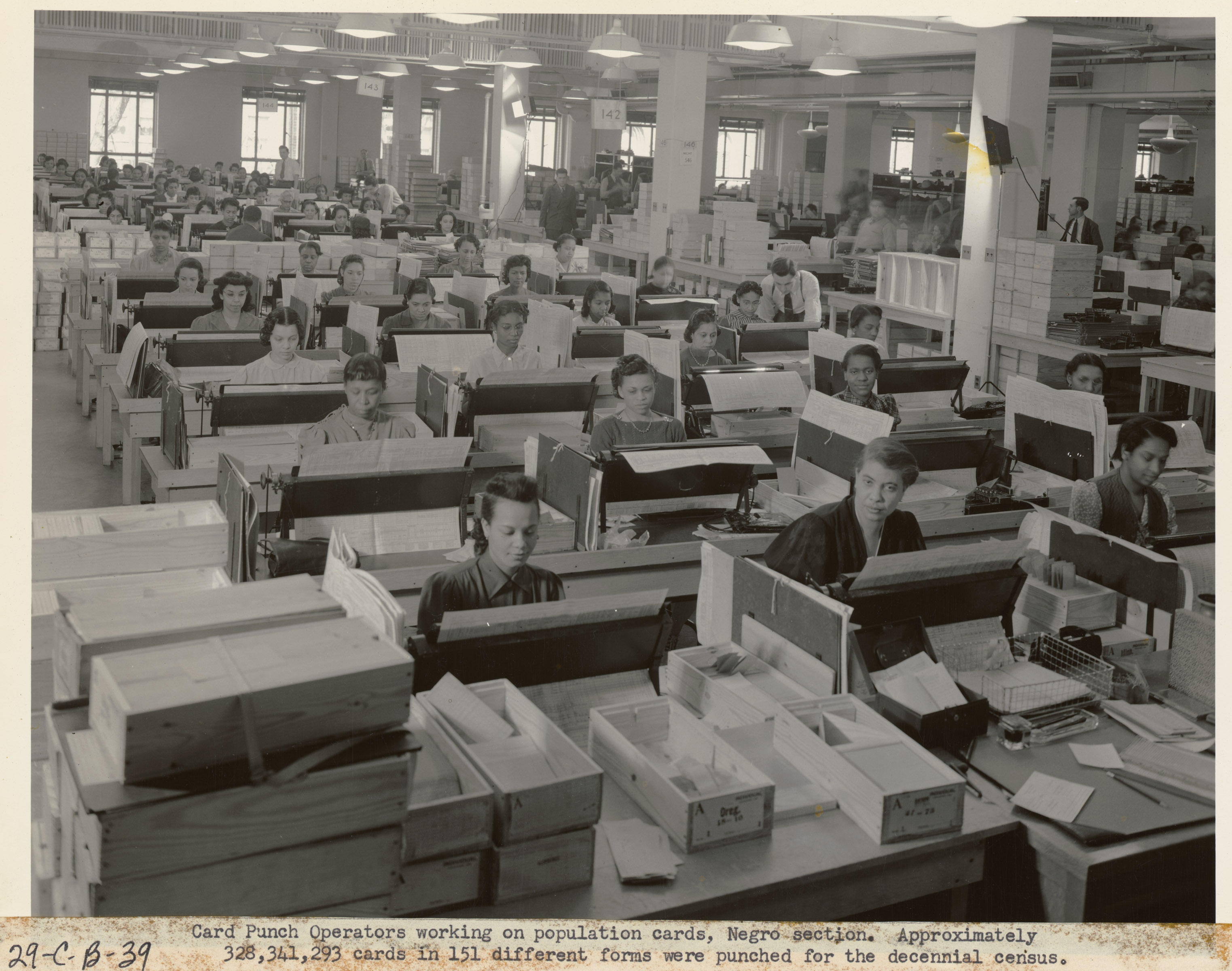
Racially segregated Negro section of keypunch operators at the US Census Bureau

Since 1977, in an attempt to keep up with changing social opinion, the United States government has officially classified Black people (revised to Black or African American in 1997) as "having origins in any of the Black racial groups of Africa." Other federal offices, such as the US Census Bureau, adhere to the Office of Management and Budget standards on race in their data collection and tabulation efforts. In preparation for the 2010 US census, a marketing and outreach plan called 2010 Census Integrated Communications Campaign Plan (ICC) recognized and defined African Americans as Black people born in the United States. From the ICC perspective, African Americans are one of three groups of Black people in the United States: African Americans, Black Africans, and Afro-Caribbeans.

The ICC plan was to reach the three groups by acknowledging that each group has its own sense of community that is based on geography and ethnicity. The best way to market the census process toward any of the three groups is to reach them through their own unique communication channels and not treat the entire Black population of the US as though they are all African Americans with a single ethnic and geographical background. The Federal Bureau of Investigation of the US Department of Justice categorizes Black or African American people as "[a] person having origins in any of the Black racial groups of Africa" through racial categories used in the UCR Program adopted from the Statistical Policy Handbook (1978) and published by the Office of Federal Statistical Policy and Standards, US Department of Commerce, derived from the 1977 Office of Management and Budget classification.

=== Admixture ===
Historically, "race mixing" between Black and White people was taboo in the United States. So-called anti-miscegenation laws, barring Blacks and Whites from marrying or having sex, were established in colonial America as early as 1691, and endured in many Southern states until the Supreme Court ruled them unconstitutional in Loving v. Virginia (1967). The taboo among American Whites surrounding White-Black relations is a historical consequence of the oppression and racial segregation of African Americans. Historian David Brion Davis notes the racial mixing that occurred during slavery was frequently attributed by the planter class to the "lower-class white males" but Davis concludes that "there is abundant evidence that many slaveowners, sons of slaveowners, and overseers took Black mistresses or in effect raped the wives and daughters of slave families." A famous example was Thomas Jefferson's mistress, Sally Hemings. Although publicly opposed to race mixing, Jefferson, in his Notes on the State of Virginia published in 1785, wrote: "The improvement of the Blacks in body and mind, in the first instance of their mixture with the whites, has been observed by every one, and proves that their inferiority is not the effect merely of their condition of life".

Harvard University historian Henry Louis Gates Jr. wrote in 2009 that "African Americans...are a racially mixed or mulatto people—deeply and overwhelmingly so". After the Emancipation Proclamation, Chinese American men married African American women in high proportions to their total marriage numbers due to few Chinese American women being in the United States. African slaves and their descendants have also had a history of cultural exchange and intermarriage with Native Americans, although they did not necessarily retain social, cultural or linguistic ties to Native peoples. There are also increasing intermarriages and offspring between non-Hispanic Blacks and Hispanics of any race, especially between Puerto Ricans and African Americans.

Racially mixed marriages have become increasingly accepted in the United States since the civil rights movement. Approval in national opinion polls has risen from 36% in 1978, to 48% in 1991, 65% in 2002, 77% in 2007. A Gallup poll conducted in 2013 found that 84% of Whites and 96% of Blacks approved of interracial marriage, and 87% overall. Black men are more than twice as likely to date and marry interracially than Black women.

At the end of World War II, some African American military men stationed in Asia and Europe impregnated local non-Black women, resulting in the birth of thousands of mixed-race children called "Brown Babies". Some of these families later immigrated to the United States. However, some mixed-race children, especially in Japan, were placed in orphanages due to social stigmas associated with half-Black fatherless children in the 1950s.

=== Terminology dispute ===
Author Debra Dickerson has argued that the term Black should refer strictly to the descendants of Africans who were brought to America as slaves, and not to the sons and daughters of Black immigrants who lack that ancestry. Thus, under her definition, President Barack Obama, who is the son of a Kenyan, is not Black. She makes the argument that grouping all people of African descent together regardless of their unique ancestral circumstances would inevitably deny the lingering effects of slavery within the American community of slave descendants, in addition to denying Black immigrants recognition of their own unique ancestral backgrounds. "Lumping us all together", Dickerson wrote, "erases the significance of slavery and continuing racism while giving the appearance of progress." Similar comments have been made concerning Kamala Harris, the daughter of a Jamaican immigrant, who was elected vice president in 2020.

Similar viewpoints to Dickerson's have been expressed by author Stanley Crouch in a New York Daily News piece, Charles Steele Jr. of the Southern Christian Leadership Conference and African American columnist David Ehrenstein of the Los Angeles Times, who accused White liberals of flocking to Blacks who were Magic Negros, a term that refers to a Black person with no past who simply appears to assist the mainstream White (as cultural protagonists/drivers) agenda. Ehrenstein went on to say "He's there to assuage white 'guilt' they feel over the role of slavery and racial segregation in American history."

The American Descendants of Slavery (ADOS) movement coalesces around this view, arguing that Black descendants of American slavery deserve a separate ethnic category that distinguishes them from other Black groups in the United States. Their terminology has gained popularity in some circles, but others have criticized the movement for a perceived bias against (especially poor and Black) immigrants, and for its often inflammatory rhetoric. Politicians such as Obama and Harris have received especially pointed criticism from the movement, as neither are ADOS and have spoken out at times against policies specific to them.

Many Pan-African movements and organizations that are ideologically Black nationalist, anti-imperialist, anti-Zionist, and Scientific socialist like The All-African People's Revolutionary Party (A-APRP), have argued that African (relating to the diaspora) or New Afrikan should be used instead of African American. Most notably, Malcolm X and Kwame Ture expressed similar views that African Americans are Africans who "happen to be in America", and should not claim or identify as being American if they are fighting for Black (New Afrikan) liberation. Historically, this is due to the enslavement of Africans during the transatlantic slave trade, ongoing anti-Black violence, and structural racism in countries like the United States.

=== Terms no longer in common use ===
Before the independence of the Thirteen Colonies until the abolition of slavery in 1865, an African American slave was commonly known as a negro. Free negro was the legal status in the territory of an African American person who was not enslaved. In response to the project of the American Colonization Society to transport free Blacks to the future Liberia, a project most Blacks strongly rejected, the Blacks at the time said they were no more African than White Americans were European, and referred to themselves with what they considered a more acceptable term, "colored Americans". The term was used until the second quarter of the 20th century, when it was considered outmoded – although it was retained in the name of the National Association for the Advancement of Colored People (NAACP) – and generally gave way again to the exclusive use of negro. By the 1940s, the term was commonly capitalized (Negro); but by the mid-1960s, it was considered disparaging. By the end of the 20th century, negro had come to be considered inappropriate and was rarely used and perceived as a pejorative. The term is rarely used by younger Black people, but remained in use by many older African Americans who had grown up with the term, particularly in the Southern US. The term remains in use in some contexts, such as the United Negro College Fund, an American philanthropic organization.

There are many other deliberately insulting terms, many of which were in common use (e.g., nigger), but had become unacceptable in normal discourse before the end of the 20th century. One exception is the use, among the Black community, of the slur nigger rendered as nigga, representing the pronunciation of the word in African American English. This usage has been popularized by American rap and hip-hop music cultures and is used as part of an in-group lexicon and speech. It is not necessarily derogatory and, when used among Black people, the word is often used to mean "homie" or "friend". Acceptance of intra-group usage of the word nigga is still debated, although it has established a foothold among younger generations. The NAACP denounces the use of both nigga and nigger.

== See also ==
- African-American art
- African American cinema
- African-American middle class
- African-American neighborhood
- African-American politics:

- African-American leftism
- African-American socialism
- Black anarchism
- Black conservatism in the United States
- Black liberalism
- Black populism
- Black women in American politics

- African-American upper class
- African diaspora in the Americas
- Afrophobia
- Afro–Puerto Ricans
- AP African American Studies
- Black Belt in the American South
- Black Hispanic and Latino Americans
- Black mecca
- Black Ozarkers
- Black Southerners
- Brown Babies
- Civil rights movement (1865–1896)
- Civil rights movement (1896–1954)
- Juneteenth
- National Museum of African American History and Culture
- North Africans in the United States
- Society and Black people in the Spanish Colonial Americas
- Runaway slaves in Spanish Florida
- South African Americans
- Stereotypes of African Americans
- Timeline of the civil rights movement
- African immigration to the United States
- West Indian Americans
- African American–Jewish relations
- African American–Korean American relations

=== Diaspora ===
- African Americans in Africa
  - African Americans in Ghana
  - Americo-Liberian people
  - Sierra Leone Creole people
  - Nigerian Americans
  - Ethiopian Americans
- Afro-Caribbean people
  - Bahamian Americans
  - Barbadian Americans
  - Grenadian Americans
  - Haitian Americans
  - Jamaican Americans
  - Trinidadian and Tobagonian Americans
- Black Canadians
- African Americans in France
- African Americans in Israel
- Black Nova Scotians
- Samaná Americans
- Haitian emigration
- Merikins

=== Lists ===
- Index of articles related to African Americans
- List of African-American neighborhoods
- List of majority-Black counties in the United States
- List of African-American newspapers and media outlets
- List of historically black colleges and universities
- List of African-American astronauts
- List of African-American inventors and scientists
- List of African-American LGBT people
- List of African American poets
- List of African-American visual artists
- List of monuments to African Americans
- List of populated places in the United States with African-American plurality populations
- List of topics related to the African diaspora
- List of African-American holidays
- Lists of African Americans
