= History of Marshall, Texas =

This article is part of the
Marshall series.

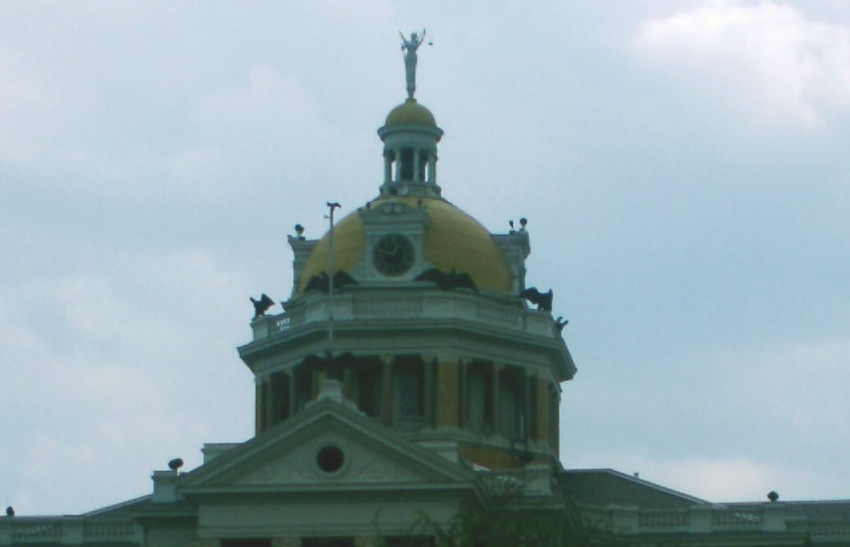

History
Media
People
Places
Marshall ISD
edit this box

The History of Marshall, Texas follows the State from its founding as an administrative center of the Republic of Texas, through its rise to be one of the largest cities in the early State of Texas, to its emergence as a major Confederate city, to its establishment as a major railroad hub of the United States in the late 19th century, through its national influence on the American Civil Rights Movement, through its steady economic decline in the late 20th century, and to the reemergence of growth in the 1990s and early 21st century.

== 19th century ==
Marshall's history began when the area that is now Marshall received its first known settlers in 1839. While activities among Caddos, and other Southeastern Native American peoples certainly took place in the area that is now Marshall, no known settlement existed at Marshall, as was the case of the original location of neighboring Elysian Fields.

In 1841 a new seat was sought for Harrison County, and a local settler named Peter Whetstone, offered some of his land in central Harrison County to build the new city on. He offered to build a church and a school on and to subsequently divide the remaining land into 190 lots. County commissioners were initially concerned that the water in the area would not be good. The reason for moving the county seat from sites on the Sabine River like Pulaski was that they had poor water, were prone to disease, and flooding. Whetstone is alleged to have convinced the commissioners that the water was good by pulling a jug of whiskey out from a hollow in an oak tree in what is now downtown Marshall. He passed around the jug, and convinced the commissioners to build on the site; either by convincing them that the whiskey (and water) were good, getting them drunk, or both. Some historians view this account as embellished or untrue.

Whetstone's friend Isaac Van Zandt, laid out the city and named it in honor of John Marshall. The city was formally incorporated in 1841 by the Republic of Texas. The city quickly became a major city in the state, because of its position as a gateway to Texas on several major stage coach lines. The city's growing importance was strengthened when Marshall was linked by a telegraph line to New Orleans, becoming the first city in Texas to have a telegraph service. Several academies sprang up, many of them supported by Whetstone, who, ironically, was illiterate.

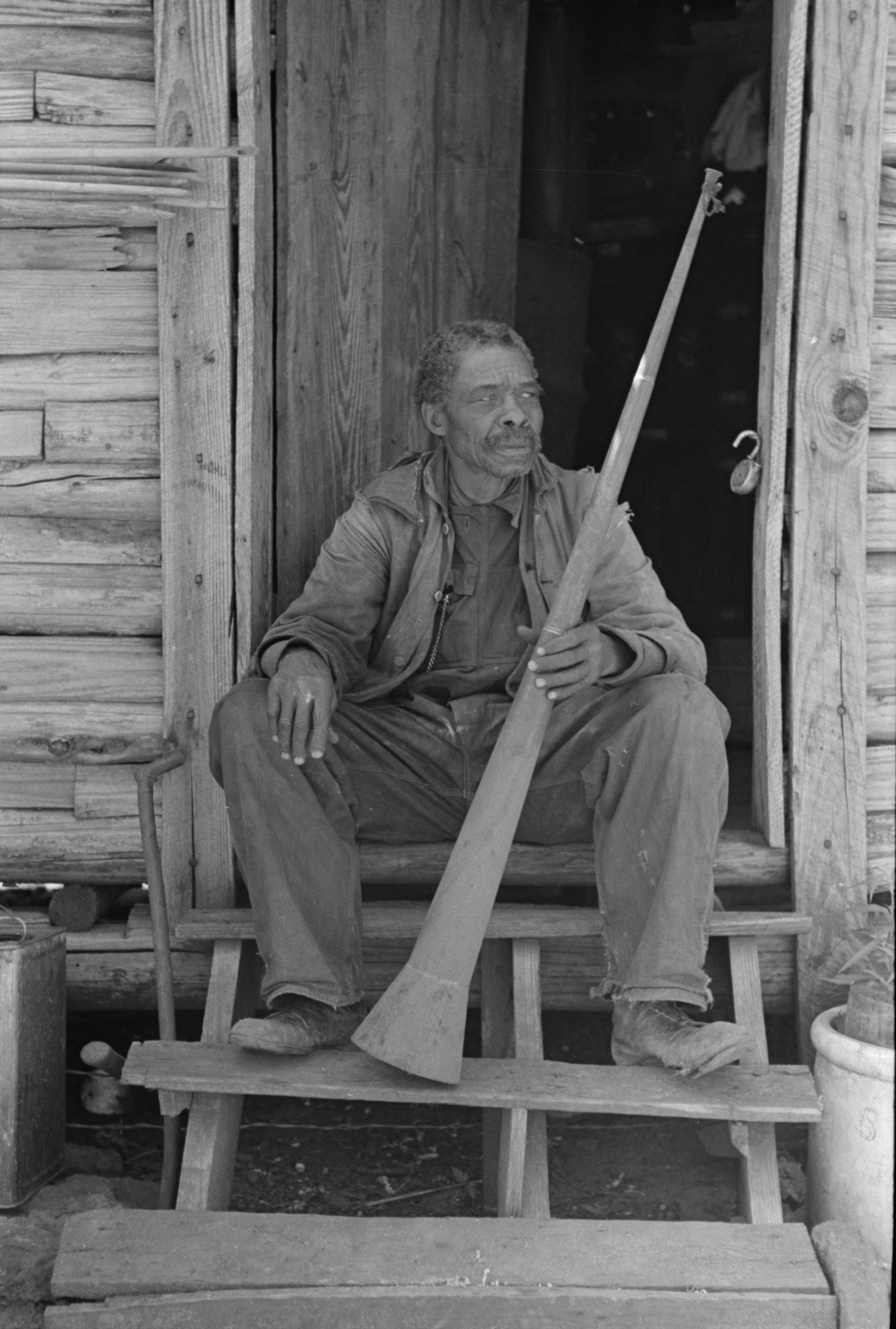
Many African-Americans came to Marshall during Reconstruction; but the establishment of the White Citizens Party after the Union troops departed kept many former slaves locked into poverty. A former slave displays a horn formerly used to call slaves on the outskirts of Marshall in 1939.

By 1860 the city was the fifth largest city in Texas, the "first metropolis of East Texas with a population of about 2,000", according to Randolph B. Campbell author of Gone to Texas, and the seat of the richest county. The county had more slaves than any other in the state, making it a hotbed of anti-Union sentiment. In the 1850s there were so many skilled slaves in Marshall, that white mechanics organized to protest that work was being taken away from "free" workers. When Gov. Sam Houston refused to take an oath of allegiance to the Confederacy, Marshall's Edward Clark was sworn in as governor. Marshall would also produce Texas' third Confederate governor, Pendleton Murrah. Marshall became a major Confederate city, becoming the capital of Missouri's Confederate government-in-exile, producing gunpowder and other supplies for the Confederate Army, and hosting three conferences of Trans-Mississippi and Indian Territory leaders.

Marshall became the seat of civil authority and headquarters of the Trans-Mississippi Postal Department after the fall of Vicksburg. The city would remain influential in the Confederacy throughout the war, as a power center west of the Mississippi, which hosted Confederate governors during the Marshall Conferences in 1862, 1863, and 1865. The city may have been the intended target of a failed Union advance that was rebuffed at Mansfield, Louisiana. Towards the end of the Civil War Richmond had $9 million in Treasury notes and $3 million in postage stamps shipped to Marshall, possibly meaning that Marshall was the intended destination of a government preparing to flee from advancing armies. With high desertion among the Confederate army in the final days of the war, the Confederate powder mill at Marshall was abandoned to looters.

Marshall was occupied by Union forces on June 17, 1865, two days before the force, made famous by Juneteenth, arrived at Galveston. During Reconstruction the city was home to an office of the Freedmen's Bureau and was the base for Union troops. In 1873 The Methodist Episcopal Church founded Wiley College to educate free men. African-Americans came to the city seeking opportunities and protection until 1878, when the Citizens Party, led by former Confederate General Walter P. Lane and his brother George, took control of the city and county governments and ran Unionists, Republicans and many African-Americans out of town. The Lanes ultimately declared Marshall and Harrison County "redeemed" from Union and African-American control. Despite this the African-American community would continue to progress with the establishment of Bishop College in 1881 and the certification of Wiley by the Freedman's Aid Society in 1882.

Marshall's "Railroad Era" began in the early 1870s. Harrison County citizens voted to offer $300,000 bond subsidy, and the City of Marshall offered to donate land north of the downtown to the Texas and Pacific Railway if the company would move to Marshall. T&P President Jay Gould accepted and located the T&P's workshops and general offices for Texas in Marshall. The city benefited immediately from a population explosion. By 1880 the city was one of the South's largest cotton markets. The city's new prosperity became apparent when the first department store in Texas, J. Weisman and Co., opened in 1878. Many Jews, too, moved to Marshall following the arrival of the railroad and a temple was erected in 1900.

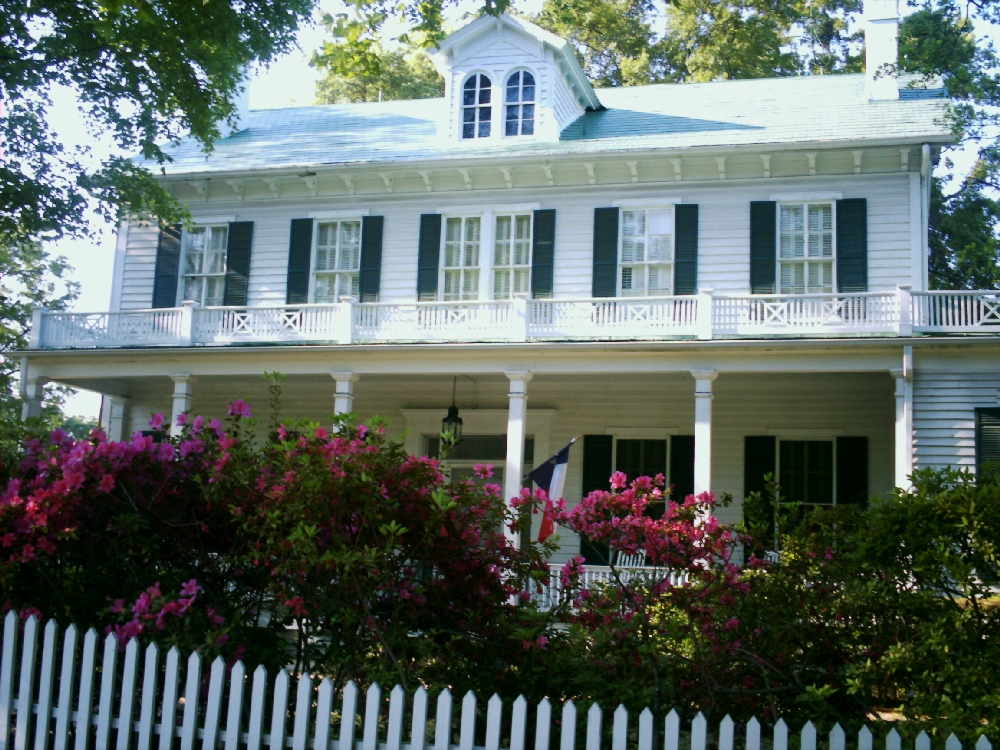
Maplecroft, as it appears today, stands at the corner of Travis and Grove Streets in Downtown Marshall, Texas. It is now the center piece of Starr Family Home State Historic Site.

During this period of wealth many of the city's now historic homes were constructed. Homes such as Maplecroft, commissioned by James F. Starr. The 1871 Starr home is a two-story frame, late Greek Revival structure with some Victorian styling. Craftsmen, such as shipwrights, and building materials were shipped from New Orleans to Marshall.

Marshall Pottery was founded by W. F. Rocker in Marshall in 1895. Rocker located the business in East Texas because of its abundant water and white clay deposits. It makes red clay pottery.

Despite the prosperity of the railroad era, poverty continued to be a problem in the city among all races, but tensions between whites and African-Americans continued to worsen as segregation crystallized in the city. The rural areas of Harrison County saw greater interaction between white people and African-Americans. There, whites and blacks being neighbors was commonplace. Even though the areas surrounding Marshall were somewhat integrated, racism certainly was still apparent in everyday life. The fact that several planters divided up sizable tracts of land and gave them to their former slaves may also have contributed to these tensions.

== 20th century ==
During the late 19th and early 20th centuries, children of both races were raised to accept the status quo of segregation. African American Marshall resident George Dawson later wrote about his childhood experiences with segregation in his book Life Is So Good. He described how, despite African American children's acceptance of segregation, in some instances, its demands were too outrageous to follow. For example, Dawson described how he had refused the demand of one employer who expected him to eat with her dogs.

1913-02-25: Two African Americans were lynched in Marshall on this date. Robert Perry was shot to death by a mob after being accused of horse stealing. Another African American, by the family name of Anderson, was hanged by a mob for unknown reasons.

1914-04-29: Charles Fisher, a young African-American resident of Marshall, was accused of hugging and kissing the daughter of a white farmer. News of the incident spread widely, and a lynch mob was formed. Fisher was found, kidnapped, and mutilated both physically and sexually, and then released. Fisher was later examined by Sheriff Sanders and County Health Officer Taylor, who found that the mob had sheared off Mr. Fisher's ears, slit his lips, and mutilated his genitals. Fisher survived, but never totally recovered. None of the mob was ever captured.

Other known victims of lynching from this time period include:

- Walker Davis October 1, 1903,
- James Hodges April 27, 1909,
- Matthew Chase April 30, 1909,
- "Mose" Creole April 30, 1909,
- "Pie" Hill April 30, 1909,
- 1 unidentified black man October 29, 1911,
- Mary Jackson February 13, 1912,
- George Saunders February 13, 1912,
- Unknown Anderson February 25, 1913,
- Charles Jones August 22, 1917.

In 1949, Marshall banned the movie Pinky from the city because it portrayed an interracial couple, a violation of the city's censorship code. The city was sued and the case went all the way to the U.S. Supreme Court, which overturned the city's censorship law.

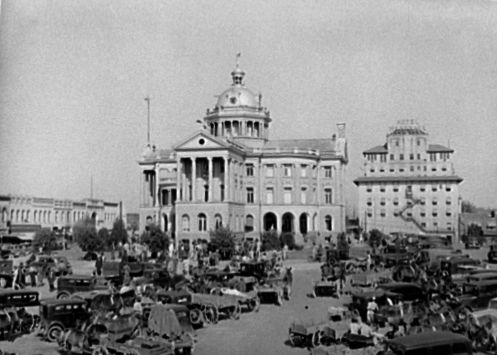
The community has developed in and around Whetstone Square, shown here in 1939. Guests lodged in the Capitol Hotel, right, and the taller Hotel Marshall directly behind it. In the 1960s the Harrison County Courthouse, center, hosted the first sit-ins in Texas.

Three graduates of Wiley College, inspired by the teachings of Wiley professor Melvin B. Tolson, helped to dismantle Jim Crow at the county, state, and national levels. Fred Lewis, as the secretary of the Harrison County NAACP, challenged the oldest White Citizens Party in Texas and the Jim Crow laws it enforced, ultimately abolishing Jim Crow in the county with the Perry v. Cyphers verdict. Heman Sweatt tried to enroll in the University of Texas Law school, but was denied entry because of the color of his skin; he sued and the Texas Supreme Court ordered the desegregation of postgraduate studies in Texas in the Sweatt v. Painter decision. James Farmer became an organizer of the Freedom Rides and a founder of the Congress of Racial Equality.

The progression of civil rights would continue into the 1960s, 1970s, and 1980s. In the 1960s, students organized the first sit-ins in Texas in the rotunda of the county courthouse on Whetstone Square in a move to end segregation of public schools; in 1970, all Marshall public schools were integrated. Also in that year, Carolyn Abney became the first woman to be elected to the city commission. In April 1975, local businessman Sam Birmingham became the first African-American to be elected to the city commission and, in the 1980s, Marshall's first African-American mayor. Birmingham retired in 1989 for health concerns and was succeeded by his wife, Jean Birmingham, who became the first African-American woman to serve on the commission.

During the first half of the 20th century, the Texas & Pacific Railroad experienced its height under the leadership of John L. Lancaster. Marshall's industry picked up with the discovery of what was then the largest oil field in the world at nearby Kilgore in 1930. Marshall's railroad industry subsequently declined with the dieselization of most trains, the proliferation of air travel, and the construction of the Interstate highway system after World War II. The T&P Shops closed in the 1960s and T&P passenger service ceased in 1970. The Texas oil bust of the 1980s devastated the local economy and the city's population declined by about a thousand between 1980 and 1990.
