= List of people from Marshall, Texas =

This is a list of notable people associated with Marshall, Texas.

This article is part of the
Marshall series.

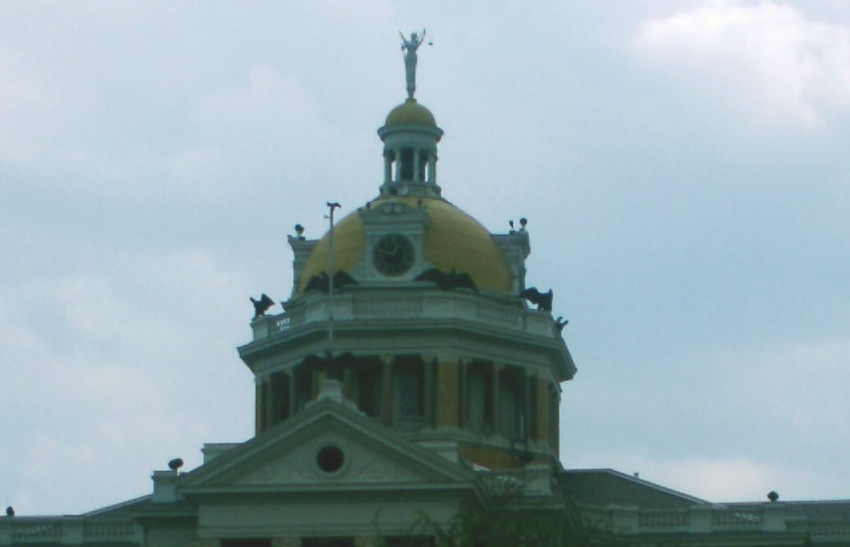

History
Media
People
Places
Marshall ISD
edit this box

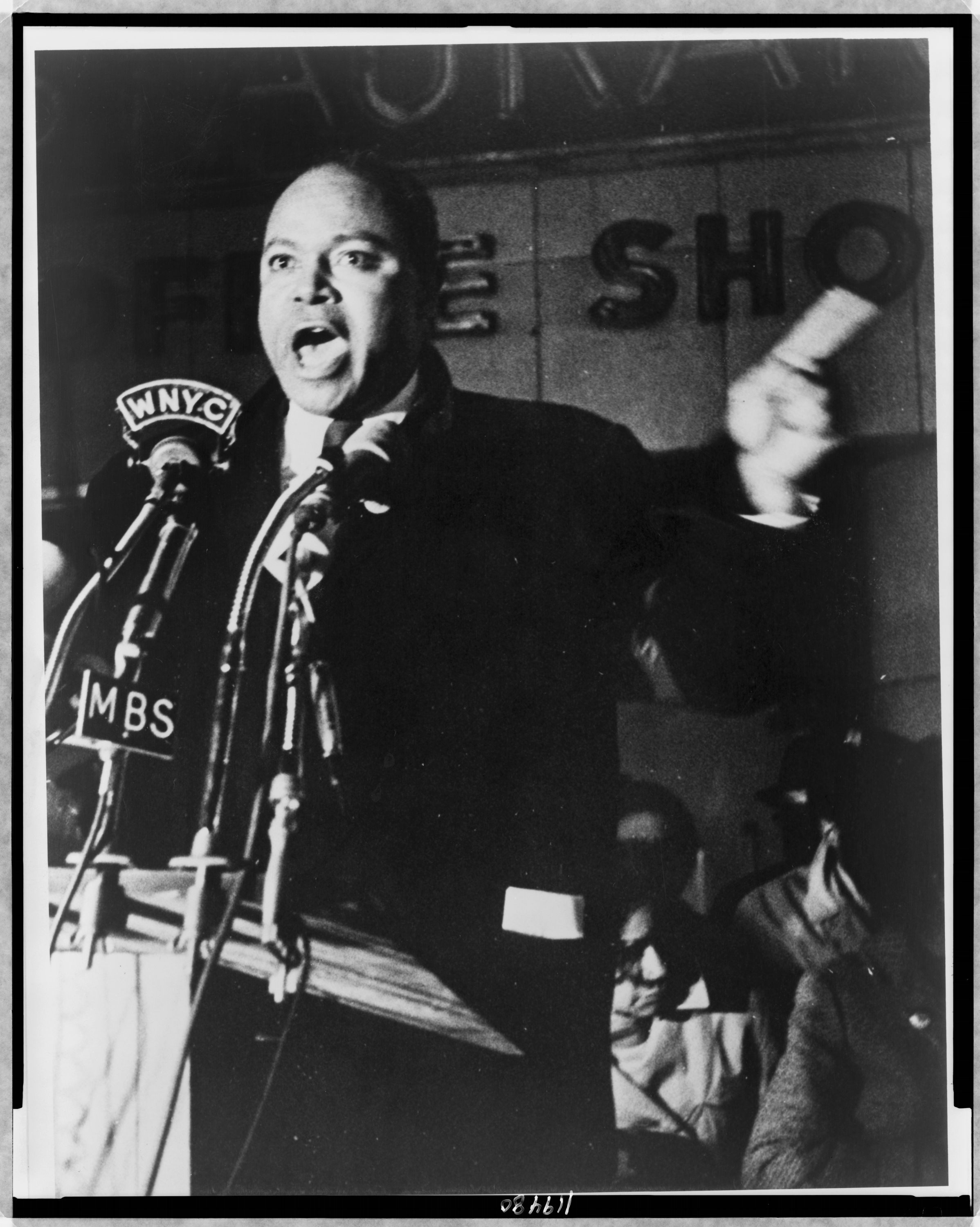
James Farmer

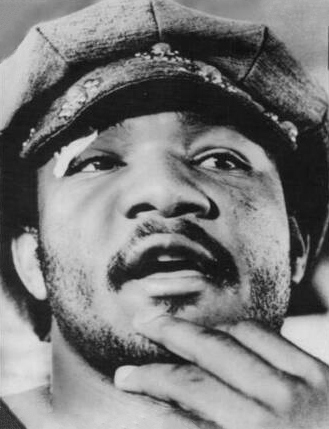
George Foreman

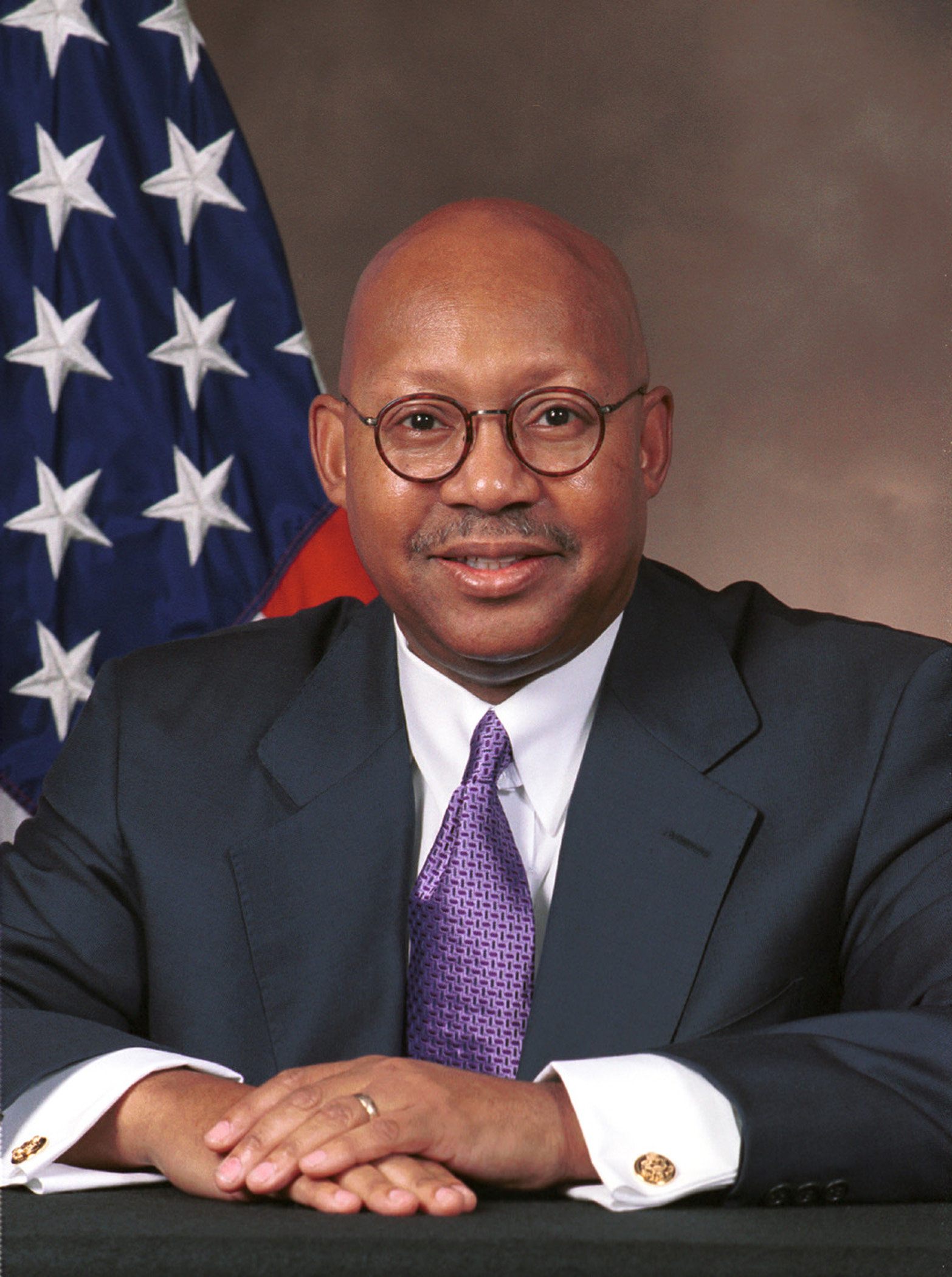
Alphonso Jackson

This list is incomplete.

- Phillip Baldwin, jurist
- Mike Barber, football player, evangelist
- John Burke, lawyer, soldier, and spy
- John Cacioppo, neuroscientist
- Robert Campbell (American artist), a painter, poet, and publisher
- Edward Clark, Texas Governor
- Mike Clark, NFL placekicker
- Kathleen Neal Cleaver, Black Panther Party member
- George Dawson, author
- Floyd Dixon, R&B pianist
- Mathew Ector, jurist and legislator
- James Farmer, founder of CORE, organized freedom rides
- James L. Farmer, Sr., first Black Texan to hold a doctorate
- George Foreman, athlete and entrepreneur
- Joseph C. Goulden, best-selling author and political reporter
- Brea Grant, actress
- Ben Z. Grant, playwright, Texas legislator, state judge
- Homer Hailey, Church of Christ preacher and author, born in Marshall in 1903
- Sam B. Hall, Jr., former congressman and federal jurist
- Alexander Hawthorn, lawyer, minister, and C.S. Army general
- James Pinckney Henderson, first governor of Texas
- Susan Howard, actress, writer, activist
- Alphonso Jackson, 13th U.S. Secretary of Housing and Urban Development, appointed by President George W. Bush
- Walter P. Lane, Confederate General
- Ken Lattimore, member of the Western singing group Sons of the Pioneers (1998-current).
- Opal Lee, Activist promoting the Juneteenth federal holiday
- Fred T. Long, Wiley College football coach and athletic director
- Robert W. Loughery, journalist, publisher, and diplomat
- Ashley C. McKinley, aviator; explorer
- Blanche L. McSmith, Alaska state representative, activist, and businesswoman
- Leo Michelson, painter and sculptor
- John T. Mills, Supreme Court Justice of the Republic of Texas
- Robert Morris, former televangelist
- Johnny Moss, champion poker player
- Bill Moyers, journalist and government official
- Pendleton Murrah, Texas Governor
- Lucy Holcombe Pickens, 19th-century Southern socialite
- William Henry Pope, politician, self-described "Jim Crow Senator"
- Horace Randal, Confederate brigadier general
- Wendy Russell Reves, fashion model, philanthropist
- Henry Roquemore, 20th-century actor
- Max Sandlin, former congressman and House Minority Whip
- I. B. Scott, Methodist Episcopal cleric, newspaper editor, and educator
- Franklin Barlow Sexton, Confederate Congressman
- Terrance Shaw, NFL cornerback
- Kendrick Starling, NFL wide receiver
- James Harper Starr, politician
- Y. A. Tittle, football Hall of Famer
- Melvin B. Tolson, author, poet, and politician
- Isaac Van Zandt, statesman of both Republic and State of Texas
- James Wheaton, actor
- Peter Whetstone, pioneer leader, city father
- Louis T. Wigfall, U.S. Senator, later Confederate Senator
- Kevin Williams, NFL running back
- Romeo M. Williams, prominent civil rights attorney who played a pivotal role in the desegregation of Marshall, Texas.; also a U.S. Army Air Force officer and trained fighter pilot with the Tuskegee Airmen
- Savion Williams, NFL Wide Receiver
- Andrew Wommack, conservative charismatic, tv evangelist and faith healer,
- Bob Young, football player
