= Loughery =

Loughery is a surname. Notable people with the surname include:

- Bill Loughery (1907–1977), Irish academic and cricketer
- David Loughery (1953–2024), American screenwriter and producer
- Jackie Loughery (1930–2024), American actress and beauty pageant titleholder
- Kevin Loughery (born 1940), American basketball player and coach
- Michelle Loughery (born 1961), Canadian muralist
- Robert W. Loughery (1820–1894), American newspaper publisher and editor
