= Joe Weisman & Company =

Defunct American department store

Joe Weisman & Company or Joe Weisman & Co. was the first department store in Texas. It opened in the late 19th century in Marshall, Texas. The company operated for over 100 years until it went out of business in 1990. The building now houses the Weisman Center which is a Retail Cooperative based on an open mall concept.
