= Marshall Conferences =

Confederate government meetings, 1860s

The Marshall Conferences were a series of three meetings by Confederate leaders at Marshall, Texas, the capital of the exiled Confederate government of Missouri, at the suggestion of Confederate President Jefferson Davis.

== First conference ==
The first conference took place in June 1862, and was between Texas governor Francis R. Lubbock and Confederate Missouri governor Claiborne F. Jackson. The two governors produced three recommendations for Jefferson that were later endorsed by the governors of Arkansas and Louisiana, who did not attend the meeting. The recommendations were as follows: establish a branch of the Confederate treasury located west of the Mississippi River, appoint a general with commanding jurisdiction over the Trans-Mississippi states, and establish more ammunition depots in the region to alleviate an arms shortage.

== Second conference ==
The second conference taking place in August 1863, brought in leaders from Arkansas, Confederate Indian Territory, Louisiana, Confederate Missouri, and Texas.

== Third conference ==
The third and final conference took place in May 1865 and produced unrealistic terms of surrender which the Union rejected.
