= Harrison County Airport (Texas) =

Airport in Texas, United States

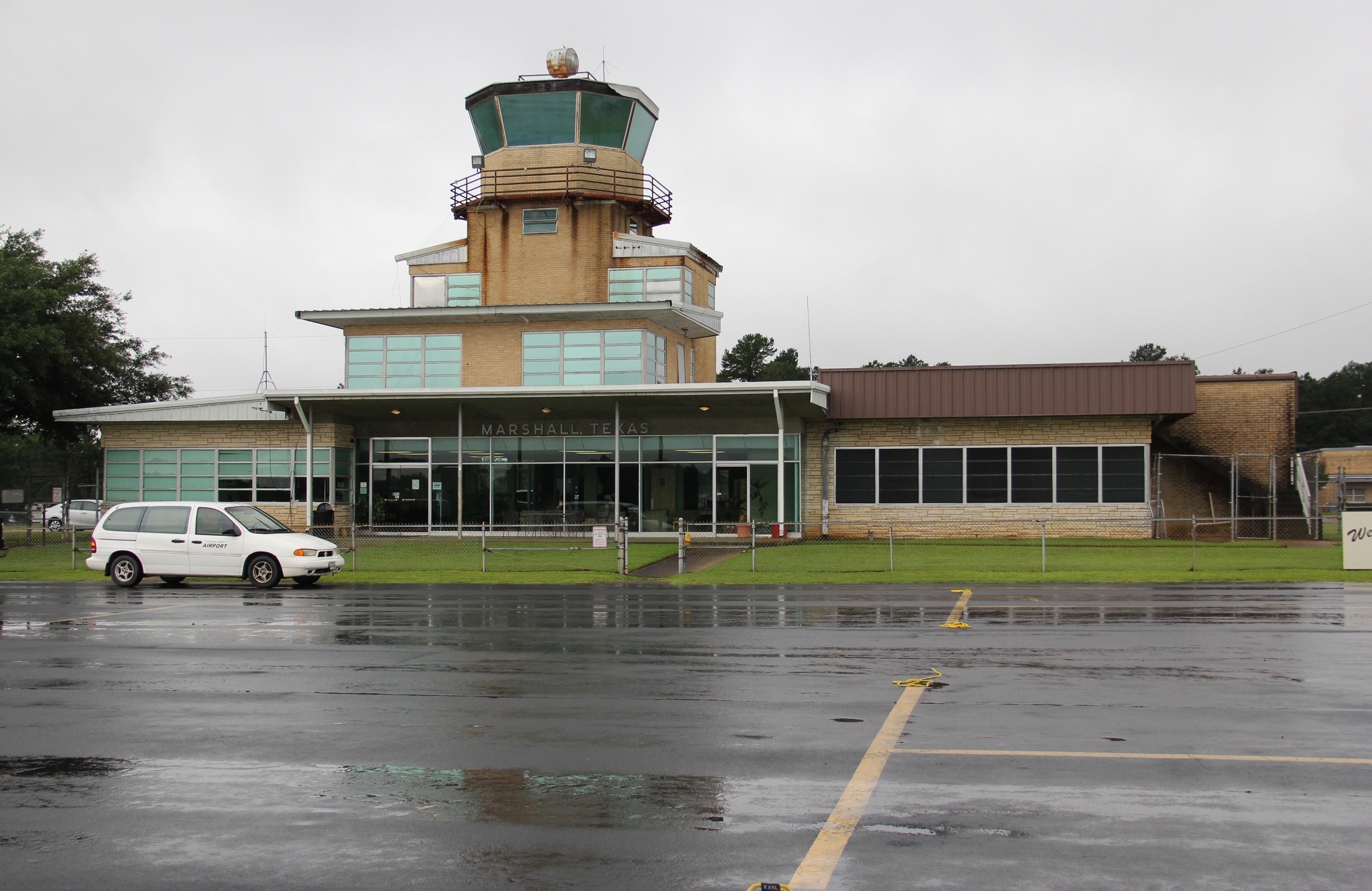
- The historic terminal that was served commercially between 1953 and 1964. The terminal currently is used by a fixed-base operator.
- IATA: ASL; ICAO: KASL; FAA LID: ASL

Summary
- Airport type: Public
- Owner: Harrison County
- Serves: Marshall, Texas
- Elevation AMSL: 357 ft (109 m)
- Coordinates: 32°31′14″N 094°18′28″W

Map
- Location within Texas

Runways
Direction	Length		Surface
Direction	ft	m	Surface
1/19	3,299	1,006	Asphalt
15/33	5,002	1,525	Asphalt

Statistics (2007)
- Aircraft operations: 16,200
- Based aircraft: 27
- Sources: FAA, Texas DOT

Harrison County Airport (IATA: ASL, ICAO: KASL, FAA LID: ASL) is a public airport three miles southeast of Marshall, Texas, in Harrison County, which owns it .

Trans-Texas Airways served the airport between 1953 and 1964 using Douglas DC-3's.

== History ==
The Harrison County Airport has history dating back to 1912 when the first airplane was assembled and operated at the ball park in town. It wasn't until 1930 that an airport was formally established, but it remained as a grass strip. In 1941, future President Lyndon B. Johnson landed at the airfield during his campaign for Senate. In the mid-1940s, public demand for an airport was growing and on July 3, 1945, Marshall voted in favor of a bond for the airport. Upgrades to the airfield from grass strip to asphalt, as well as the construction of an airport terminal began in 1949.

On August 3, 1953, the Harrison County Memorial Airport was dedicated and service with Trans-Texas Airways was initiated. Trans Texas served the airport with Douglas DC-3s on a route between Dallas and Memphis that included several other stops. On April 17, 1955, Representatives from the US Air Force arrived to discuss the possibility of a reserve center, although this was never realized. On December 28 and 29, 1961, Second Lady Lady Bird Johnson, arrived to attend a wedding. Vice President Lyndon B. Johnson arrived the day after.

In 1964, commercial airline services to Harrison County Airport were discontinued.

Meanwhile, on October 28, 1964, future President George H. W. Bush visited Marshall during his first US Senate campaign. The airport laid dormant until 1977, when Harrison County provided funds for airport improvement and 7 years later, Central Jet Service, a local fixed-base operator, began operating, and continues to operate out of the historic terminal.

== Facilities ==
Harrison County Airport covers 480 acres (190 ha) at an elevation of 357 feet (109 m). It has two asphalt runways: 15/33 is 5,002 by 100 feet (1,525 x 30 m) and 1/19 is 3,299 by 60 feet (1,006 x 18 m).

In the year ending May 28, 2007 the airport had 16,200 general aviation aircraft operations, average 44 per day. 27 aircraft were then based at the airport: 70% single-engine, 11% multi-engine, 7% jet and 11% ultralight.

The historic airport terminal still remains and is currently used by a Fixed-base operator. In 2016, the terminal building was listed on Preservation Texas' Most Endangered Buildings List.

== See also ==
- List of airports in Texas
