= Peter Whetstone =

Peter Whetstone (c. late 18th century – 1843) was an early pioneer leader in the Republic of Texas most remembered for founding the city of Marshall, Texas with Isaac Van Zandt.

Whetstone married Dicey, or Dicy, Webster in 1816 in Arkansas. He may have left Arkansas for Texas in 1829, when he transferred land to a Charlton Thompson in Lovely County, Arkansas, in what is now Oklahoma. When he settled in Harrison County, Texas in 1838 he received a first-class certificate grant, which were only issued to married men who were in Texas when the Texas Declaration of Independence was ratified, indicating he was in Texas before March 2, 1836.

In 1841 a new seat was sought for Harrison County, and Whetstone offered some of his land in central Harrison County to build a church and a school on, and to subsequently divide the remainder into 190 lots. Commissioners were initially concerned that the water in the area would not be good. The reason for moving the county seat from a site on the Sabine River like Pulaski was that it had poor water and was prone to disease and flooding. Whetstone supposedly convinced the commissioners that the water was good by pulling a jug of whiskey out from a hollow in an oak tree in what is now downtown Marshall. He passed around the jug, and convinced the commissioners to build on the site; either by convincing them that the whiskey (and water) were good, getting them drunk, or both. Some historians view this account as embellished or untrue.

Despite being credited with the founding of Marshall, Whetstone's friend Isaac Van Zandt laid out the city and named it in honor of John Marshall.

Whetstone soon became entangled in the Regulator–Moderator War as a Moderator. He supposedly killed over twenty people, and was described in his obituary as a "noted freebooter who for many years has been an object of terror and hatred on the eastern frontier of Texas".

In November 1843, Whetstone was shot and killed by a Regulator, Col. William T. Boulware, on Marshall's city square, later named Whetstone Square. His estate remained unsettled by his widow Dicey for some years after his death. Whetstone's grave is unmarked, although he is traditionally believed to be buried at a site off what is now Martin Luther King Jr. Boulevard.

Ironically, Whetstone, who was illiterate, is often attributed with establishing Marshall as an educational center by helping to finance early schools and academies.
