= Marshall Pottery =

Manufacturer of Red Clay Pots in the United States

Marshall Pottery Inc. is the largest manufacturer of red clay pots in the United States. From 1974 to 2015, Marshall Pottery operated a 100,000 ft^{2} (9,000 m^{2}) retail store adjacent to its headquarters in Marshall, Texas, which at one time attracted over 500,000 tourists each year.

== History ==
Marshall Pottery was founded by W. F. Rocker in Marshall in 1895. Rocker located the business in East Texas because of its abundant water and white clay deposits. In 1905 Marshall Pottery was acquired by Sam Ellis. With the invention of the glass canning jar and other new competing products in the 1920s, the business almost folded. Prohibition led to a thriving moonshine industry and a need for inexpensive jugs to store the liquor. If not for the sale of jugs during Prohibition, Marshall Pottery would likely have gone bankrupt.

== Automation ==
In the 1940s, with the discovery of a clay that required a lower firing temperature, the pottery began producing flower pots. For many years the company continued to employ potters as its primary means of manufacturing. One of these employees, Pete Payne, became a master potter and displayed his technique at the Smithsonian Institution. Since the construction of a new facility in 1998 most of the pottery's production has been automated. However, hand made pottery can still be purchased, and tourists can watch potters create it.

In October 2015 Marshall Pottery Old World Store closed its doors. Along with its closing went the hand-turned pottery division, leaving only the terra cotta production facility operational.

In April 2017, a Marshall Pottery worker, Arturo Gonzalez, was locked inside a kiln, which was then heated, killing him. In November 2017, OSHA fined the company over $545,000 related to Gonzalez's death. A worker died in a similar incident at Marshall in 2008.

== See also ==
- Catalina Pottery
