= Robert W. Loughery =

American journalist (1820–1894)

- Born: February 2, 1820; Nashville, Tennessee, U.S.
- Died: April 26, 1894 (aged 74); Marshall, Texas, U.S.
- Resting place: Marshall Cemetery
- Occupations: Newspaper publisher; editor
- Children: 4

Robert W. Loughery (February 2, 1820 – April 26, 1894) was a 19th-century United States newspaper publisher and editor who worked for or owned newspapers in Louisiana and Texas.

== Early life ==
Robert W. Loughery was born on February 2, 1820, in Nashville, Tennessee. At the age of 10, he became an orphan. He then found work in a printing office.

== Career ==
In 1840, Loughery started working for a newspaper in Monroe, Louisiana. In 1849, he established the Texas Republican, a paper in Marshall, Texas. He also published papers in Galveston, Texas, Jefferson, Texas, and Shreveport, Louisiana. Two of his Marshall newspapers the Texas Republican and the Tri-Weekly Herald were credited with aiding the election of Marshall citizens, J.P. Henderson, Edward Clark, and Pendleton Murrah to the Governor's office and Louis T. Wigfall to the U.S. Senate. Loughery often defended slavery and plantation agriculture in his papers; and supported secession and later the Confederacy. He supported reconciliation with the Union and acceptance of defeat of the Confederacy in the Civil War until congress approved Reconstruction.

Following the war, he defended the military depositories in Marshall and Jefferson. Under President Grover Cleveland, in his first term, Loughery was appointed as consul to Acapulco, Mexico. He served in that role about three years.

== Personal life ==
Loughery married. He had two sons and two daughters. He died on April 26, 1894, at his home in Marshall. He was buried in Marshall Cemetery.
