= Marshall, Texas =

City In Texas, United States

Marshall
- City
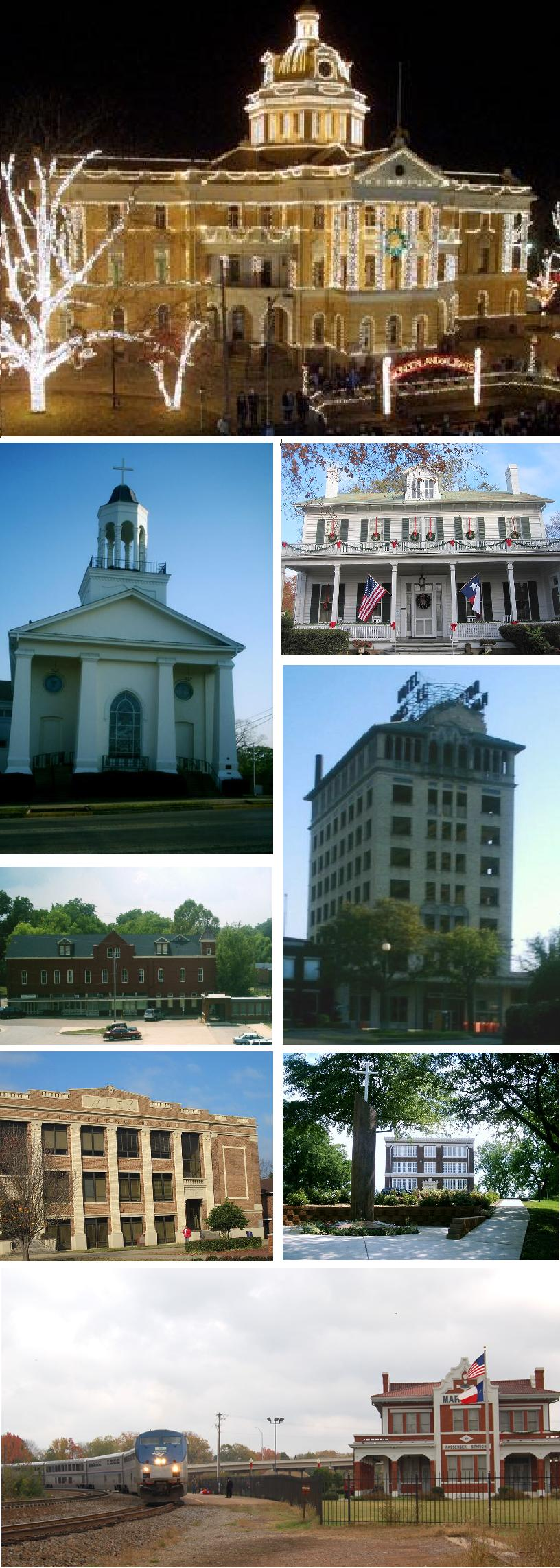
- Clockwise: Old Courthouse, Starr Home, Hotel Marshall, ETBU, Depot, Wiley, Ginnochio, First United Methodist

- Location in the state of Texas
- Coordinates: 32°32′03″N 94°22′12″W
- Country: United States
- State: Texas
- County: Harrison
- Founded: 1841 (185 years ago)

Government
  - Type: Council-Manager

Area
  - City: 29.66 sq mi (76.81 km^{2})
  - Land: 29.59 sq mi (76.65 km^{2})
  - Water: 0.066 sq mi (0.17 km^{2})
- Elevation: 341 ft (104 m)

Population (2020)
  - City: 23,392
  - Density: 771.5/sq mi (297.86/km^{2})
  - Metro: 65,631
- Time zone: UTC-6 (CST)
  - Summer (DST): UTC-5 (CDT)
- ZIP codes: 75670-75672
- Area codes: 903, 430
- FIPS code: 48-46776
- GNIS feature ID: 2411041
- Website: www.marshalltexas.net

Marshall is a city in the U.S. state of Texas. It is the county seat of Harrison County and a cultural and educational center of the Ark-La-Tex region. As of the 2020 census, Marshall had a population of 23,392. The population of the Greater Marshall area, comprising all of Harrison County, was 66,726 in 2018.

Marshall and Harrison County were important political and production areas of the Confederate States of America during the American Civil War. This area of Texas was developed for cotton plantations. Planters brought slaves with them from other regions or bought them in the domestic slave trade. The county had the highest number of slaves in the state, and East Texas had a higher proportion of slaves than other regions of the state. The wealth of the county and city depended on slave labor and the cotton market.

From the late 19th century to the mid-20th century, Marshall developed as a center of the Texas and Pacific Railway. After World War II, activists in the city's substantial African-American population worked to create social change through the civil rights movement, with considerable support from the historically black colleges and universities in the area.

The city is known for holding one of the largest light festivals in the United States, the "Wonderland of Lights". It calls itself the "Pottery Capital of the World" for its sizable pottery industry. Marshall has various nicknames: the "Cultural Capital of East Texas", the "Gateway of Texas", the "Athens of Texas", the "City of Seven Flags", and "Center Stage", a branding slogan adopted by the Marshall Convention and Visitors Bureau.

== History ==
=== Republic of Texas and Civil War (1841–1860) ===
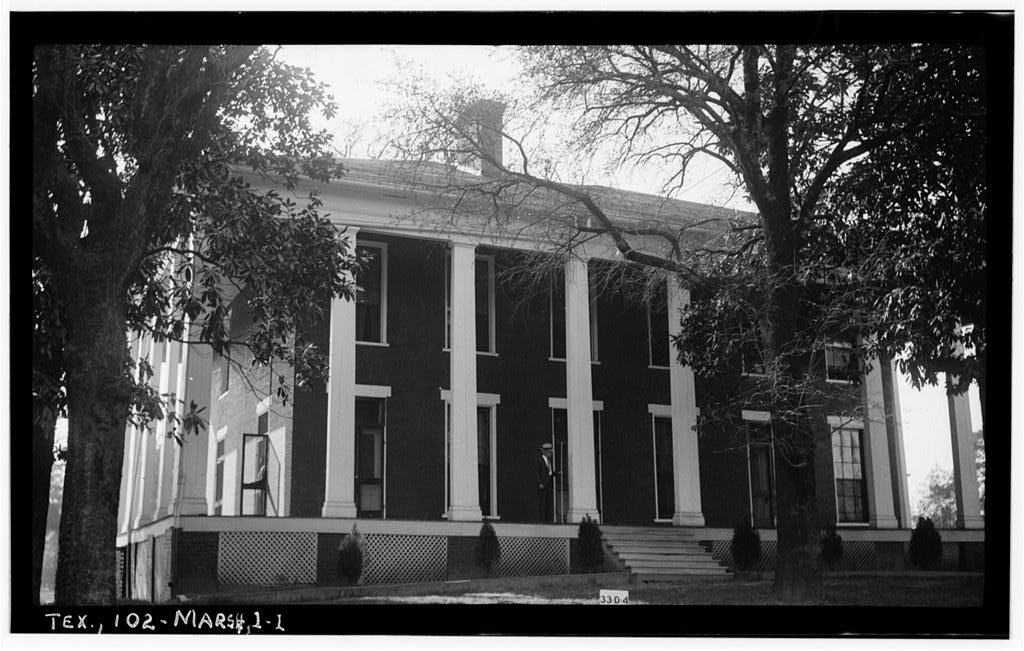
The Wyalucing plantation was the childhood home of Lucy Holcombe Pickens, the only woman whose image was used on Confederate currency. It housed the office of the Trans-Mississippi Postal Department of the Confederacy. In 1880, freedmen bought the plantation and used it for the campus of Bishop College, founded for black students. The main house was used as the president's house.

Marshall was founded in 1841 as the seat of Harrison County after failed attempts to establish a county seat on the Sabine River. It was incorporated in 1843. The Republic of Texas chose the land donated for the seat by Peter Whetstone and Isaac Van Zandt after Whetstone proved that the hilly location had a good water source.

Marshall quickly became a major city in the state because of its position as a gateway to Texas; it was on the route of several major stagecoach lines. Later, one of the first railroad lines constructed into Texas ran through it.

The founding of several colleges, including a number of seminaries, teaching colleges, and incipient universities, earned Marshall the nickname "the Athens of Texas", in reference to the ancient Greek city-state. The city's growing importance was confirmed when Marshall was linked by a telegraph line to New Orleans; it was the first city in Texas to have a telegraph service.

By 1860, Marshall was the fourth-largest city in Texas and the seat of its richest county. Developing the land for cotton plantations, county planters held more slaves here than in any other county in the state.

When Governor Sam Houston refused to take an oath of allegiance to the Confederate States of America, Marshall's Edward Clark was sworn in as governor. Pendleton Murrah, Texas's third Confederate governor, was also from Marshall.

Marshall became a major Confederate supply depot and manufacturer of gunpowder for the Confederate Army. It hosted three conferences of Trans-Mississippi and Indian Territory leaders.

The exiled Confederate government of Missouri made Marshall its temporary capital. The city took the nickname of the "City of Seven Flags". This was a nod to the flag of Missouri in addition to the six flags of the varying nations and republics that have flown over the city.

Also during the Civil War, after the fall of Vicksburg, Marshall became the seat of Confederate civil authority and headquarters of the Trans-Mississippi Postal Department. It may have been the target of a failed Union advance that was rebuffed at Mansfield, Louisiana.

Toward the end of the Civil War, the Confederate government shipped $9.0 million in treasury notes and $3.0 million in postage stamps to Marshall. It may have intended Marshall as the destination of a government preparing to flee from advancing armies.

=== Reconstruction and the railroad era (1865–1895) ===
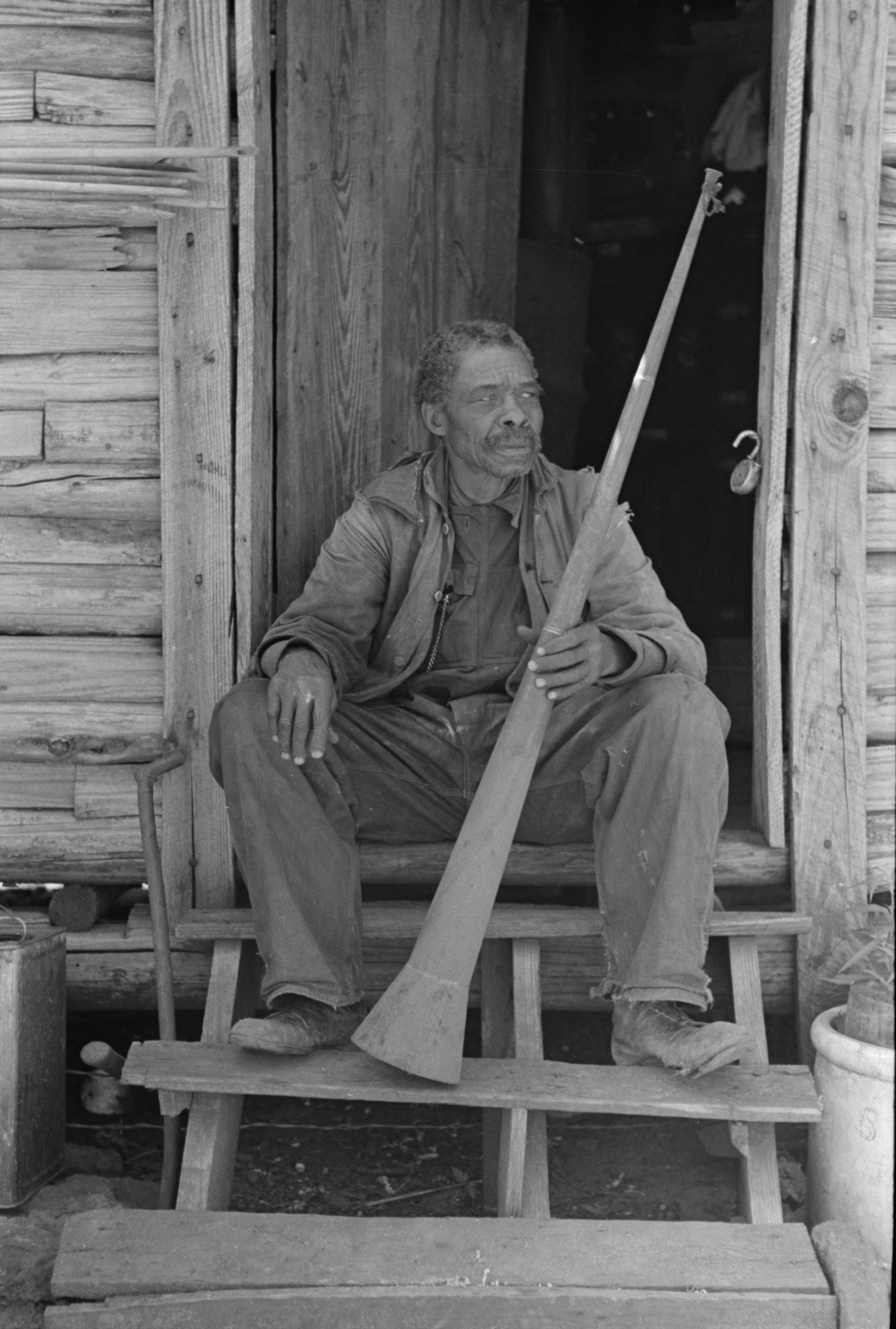
A former slave displays a horn in 1939 that was formerly used by planters to call slaves on the outskirts of Marshall. Many freedmen moved to Marshall from rural areas during Reconstruction, creating their own community and seeking the chance to live away from the supervision of whites. After Union troops departed at the end of Reconstruction, Democrats formed the White Citizens Party, establishing an insurgent militia dedicated to white supremacy.

Marshall was occupied by Union forces on June 17, 1865. During Reconstruction, the city was home to an office of the Freedmen's Bureau and was the base for federal troops in the region. In 1873, the Methodist Episcopal Church founded Wiley College to educate freedmen. African Americans came to the city seeking opportunities and protection until 1878.

Although freedmen comprised the majority of voters in the county and supported the Republican Party, establishing a biracial government, in the post-Reconstruction era, the White Citizens Party, led by former Confederate General Walter P. Lane and his brother George, took control of the city and county governments by fraud and intimidation at elections. Their militia ran Unionists, Republicans, and many African Americans out of town. The Lanes ultimately declared Marshall and Harrison County "redeemed" from Union and African-American control.

Despite this, the African-American community continued to progress. The historically black Bishop College was founded in 1881, and Wiley College was certified by the Freedman's Aid Society in 1882.

Marshall's "Railroad Era" began in the early 1870s. Harrison County citizens voted to offer a $300,000 bond subsidy, and the City of Marshall offered to donate land north of the downtown to the Texas and Pacific Railway if the company established a center in Marshall. T&P President Jay Gould accepted the incentive, locating the T&P's workshops and general offices for Texas in Marshall. The city immediately had a population explosion from workers attracted to the potential for new jobs there.

By 1880, the city was one of the South's largest cotton markets, with crops and other products shipped by the railroad. The city's prosperity attracted new businesses: J. Weisman and Co. opened there as Texas's first department store. When a light bulb was installed in the Texas and Pacific Depot, Marshall became the first city in Texas with electricity. During this period of wealth, many of the city's now-historic homes were constructed. The city's most prominent industry, pottery manufacturing, began with the establishment of Marshall Pottery in 1895.

Despite the prosperity of the railroad era, some city residents struggled with poverty. Blacks were severely discriminated against under Jim Crow laws and customs. At the turn of the 20th century, the Democratic-dominated state legislature passed segregation laws and disenfranchised most blacks and Hispanics, as did all the states of the former Confederacy in this period. These minorities were essentially excluded from the political system for more than 60 years. Unable to vote, they were also excluded from juries and suffered injustices from all-white juries. In addition, from 1877 to 1950, Harrison County had 14 lynchings, most in the early 20th century, and more than any other county in Texas.

In the rural areas of Harrison County, more interaction occurred between whites and African Americans than in the city, and whites and blacks were often neighbors, but Jim Crow rules were strongly imposed on African Americans.

=== Early and mid-20th century ===
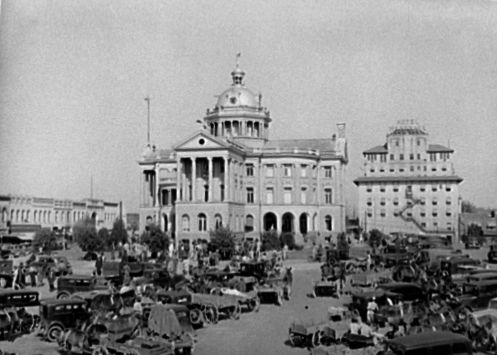
The community has developed in and around Whetstone Square, shown here in 1939. White guests stayed at the Capitol Hotel, right, and the taller Hotel Marshall directly behind it. In the 1960s, the Harrison County Courthouse, center, was the site of the first sit-ins in Texas by the civil rights movement.

In 1909, a field of natural gas was discovered near Caddo Lake; it was exploited to supply city needs. Under the leadership of John L. Lancaster, the Texas and Pacific Railway reached the height of its success during the first half of the 20th century. Marshall's ceramics industry expanded to the point that boosters called the city the "Pottery Capital of the World".

In 1930, what was then the largest oil field in the world was discovered at nearby Kilgore. The first student at Marshall High School to have a car was Lady Bird Johnson, a kind of progress that excited many students.

During the late 19th and early 20th centuries, children of both races were forced to accept the law of racial segregation in the state. Marshall resident George Dawson became a writer late in life when he learned to read and write at age 98. He described his childhood under segregation in his 2013 memoir Life Is So Good, written with Richard Glaubman. He said that in some instances, other blacks and he resisted the demands of Jim Crow. For instance, he rejected an employer who expected him to eat with her dogs.

As blacks were excluded from politics and tensions rose, more lynchings of black men took place, a form of extrajudicial punishment and social control. Beginning in the late 19th century, 14 black men were lynched in the county, the third-highest total in the state. Suspects were often brought to Marshall for lynching or taken from the county jail before trial and hanged in the courthouse square for maximum public effect of terrorizing the black population. Between October 1903 and August 1917, at least 12 black men were lynched in Marshall. Not all instances of lynching were documented, so there may have been others.

In the early and mid-20th century, Marshall's traditionally black colleges, Wiley and Bishop, were thriving intellectual and cultural centers. Writer Melvin B. Tolson, who was part of the Harlem Renaissance, taught at Wiley College. Painter Samuel Countee, a Texas-born student of Bishop College in the mid-1930s, exhibited at the Harmon Exhibitions in 1935–1937 and won a scholarship to study at the Boston Museum of Fine Arts. Countee had a successful career as a teacher and artist in the New York City area, where he lived for the rest of his life.

Inspired by the teachings of professors such as Tolson, students and former students of the colleges mobilized to challenge and dismantle Jim Crow laws and institutions in the 1950s and 1960s. As secretary of the Harrison County National Association for the Advancement of Colored People, Fred Lewis challenged the White Citizens Party in Harrison County, which had the oldest chapter in Texas, and the laws the party supported. This suit overturned Jim Crow in the county with the Perry v. Cyphers ruling. Heman Sweatt, a Wiley graduate, tried to enroll in the University of Texas at Austin Law School, but was denied entry because of his race. He sued and the United States Supreme Court ordered the desegregation of postgraduate studies in public universities in Texas in Sweatt v. Painter (1950). James Farmer, another Wiley graduate, became an organizer of the Freedom Rides and a founder of the Congress of Racial Equality, which was active throughout the South.

=== Late 20th – early 21st centuries ===
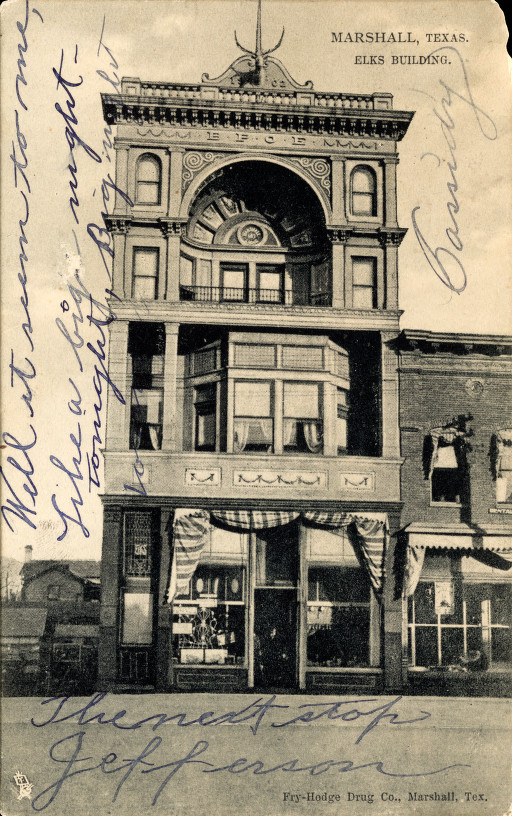
Elks Building, Marshall, Texas (postcard, 1909)

The civil rights movement reached into the 1960s, 1970s, and 1980s. In the 1960s, students organized the first sit-ins in Texas in the rotunda of the county courthouse on Whetstone Square. They protested continuing segregation of public schools. This practice had been declared unconstitutional in 1954 by the Supreme Court in Brown v. Board of Education. In 1970, all Marshall public schools were finally integrated.

Also in 1970, Carolyn Abney became the first woman elected to the Marshall City Commission. In 1975, nearly a decade after passage of the federal Voting Rights Act of 1965, local businessman Sam Birmingham became the first African American elected to the city commission. In the 1980s, he was elected as the city's first African-American mayor. Birmingham retired in 1989 for health reasons and was succeeded by his wife, Jean Birmingham.

Marshall's railroad industry declined during the restructuring of the industry; most trains were converted to diesel fuel, and many lines merged. Construction of the Interstate Highway System after World War II and expansion of trucking, plus the increase in airline traffic, also led to railway declines. The T&P shops closed in the 1960s, and T&P passenger service ceased in 1970. The Texas oil bust of the 1980s devastated the local economy. The city's population declined by about 1,000 between 1980 and 1990.

During the mid-20th century, the city lost many of its historic landmarks to redevelopment or neglect. For a time, people preferred "modern" structures. Other buildings were demolished because tax laws favored new construction.

By 1990, Marshall's opera house, the Missouri Capitol, the Moses Montefiore Synagogue, the original Viaduct, the Capitol Hotel, and the campus of Bishop College (including the Wyalucing plantation house) had been demolished. In the 1970s, the city began to study historic preservation efforts of nearby Jefferson. Since then, it has emphasized preservation of historic assets.

Due to newly completed construction projects, the city was one of 10 designated in 1976 as an All-America City by the National Civic League. In 1978, Taipei Mayor Lee Teng-hui and Marshall Mayor William Q. Burns signed legislation recognizing Marshall as a sister city to the much larger Taipei. During this period, Bill Moyers won an Emmy for his documentary Marshall, Texas, chronicling the city's history of race relations.

The city's economy declined from the 1960s through the 1980s, largely because of oil industry and manufacturing changes. Population declined after jobs left the area. Longview surpassed Marshall in population and economy.

In the 1980s and 1990s, the city began to concentrate on diversifying its economy. It emphasized heritage and other tourism. The city founded two new festivals, the Fire Ant Festival and the Wonderland of Lights, which joined the longstanding Stagecoach Days. The Fire Ant Festival gained national attention after being featured on television in programs such as the Oprah Winfrey Show.

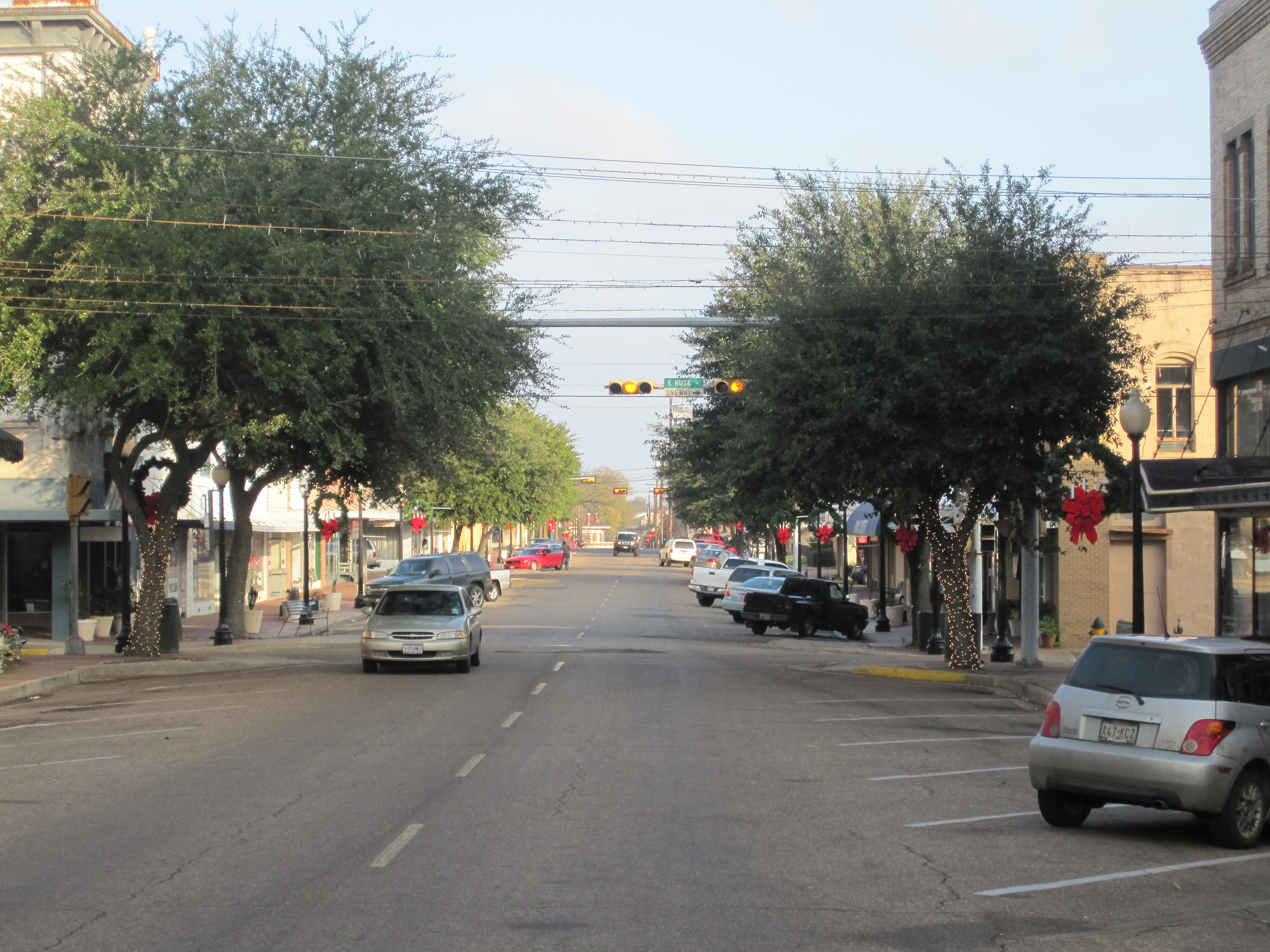
Downtown Marshall to the north of the former Harrison County Courthouse, 2009

The Wonderland of Lights became the most popular and one of the largest light festivals in the United States. By 2000, it had become such a prominent part of the cityscape that the lighted dome of the Old Courthouse was the city's most recognizable symbol; 2011 marked the festival's 25th anniversary.

During the 2000s, the downtown area experienced moderate economic growth, which supported restoration of significant buildings. By 2005, the Joe Weisman and Company building, the T&P Depot, the former Hotel Marshall (now known as "The Marshall"), and the former Harrison County Courthouse were either restored or under restoration.

Restaurants, boutiques, and loft apartments were developed downtown, adding to the variety of its daily life and the number of pedestrians on the streets. Some projects adapted historic structures for reuse. Many historic homes outside downtown continue to deteriorate. Some structures in moderate condition were approved for demolition, to be replaced by prefabricated or tin structures. Whetstone Square has become quite busy, with few empty buildings around it. Lack of funding and manpower has slowed movement on demolition and salvage of historic homes.

The Sam B. Hall, Jr. Federal Courthouse has been the venue for several cases challenging state practices under provisions of the Voting Rights Act of 1965. For instance, the Democratic Party challenged the 2003 redistricting by the state legislature, arguing that it diluted minority rights. Combined with two other cases, these issues were heard by the United States Supreme Court in League of United Latin American Citizens v. Perry (2006). It upheld the state's actions, with the exception of Texas's 23rd congressional district; redistricting was required that also affected neighboring districts. This had little effect on the Republican majority of Texas's congressional delegation after the 2004 elections.

An unusually high number of patent lawsuits were filed in the United States District Court for the Eastern District of Texas, which includes Marshall, Tyler, and Texarkana. TiVo sued EchoStar over digital video recorder patent rights. Marshall has a reputation for plaintiff-friendly juries for the 5% of patent lawsuits that reach trial. This has resulted in 78% plaintiff wins. The number of patent suits filed in 2002 was 32, and the number for 2006 was estimated at 234. The number of patent suits filed here were second only to the United States District Court for the Central District of California in 2009. The trend continued through 2011 in the Eastern District of Texas, which includes Marshall, with the number of patent lawsuits more than doubling from 2010.

Marshall was profiled on This American Life, as its juries' support of plaintiffs in patent suits has generated controversy.

On January 18, 2010, John Tennison, a San Antonio physician and musicologist, publicized his research that found that boogie-woogie music was first developed in the Marshall area in the early 1870s. It originated among African Americans working with the T&P Railroad and the logging industry. On May 13, 2010, the Marshall City Commission unanimously passed an ordinance declaring Marshall "the Birthplace of Boogie Woogie". On September 2, 2018, the Harrison County Historic Commission unveiled a state Texas Historic Marker that declares Marshall as the birthplace of Boogie Woogie.

== Geography ==
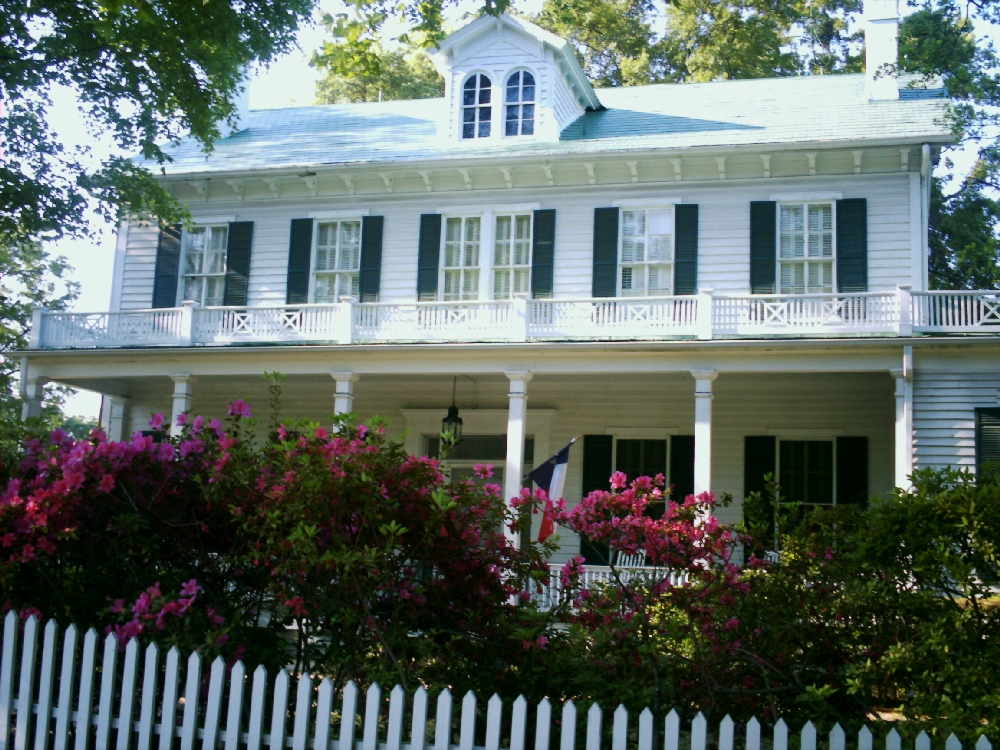
Maplecroft is the centerpiece of the Starr Family Home State Historic Site.

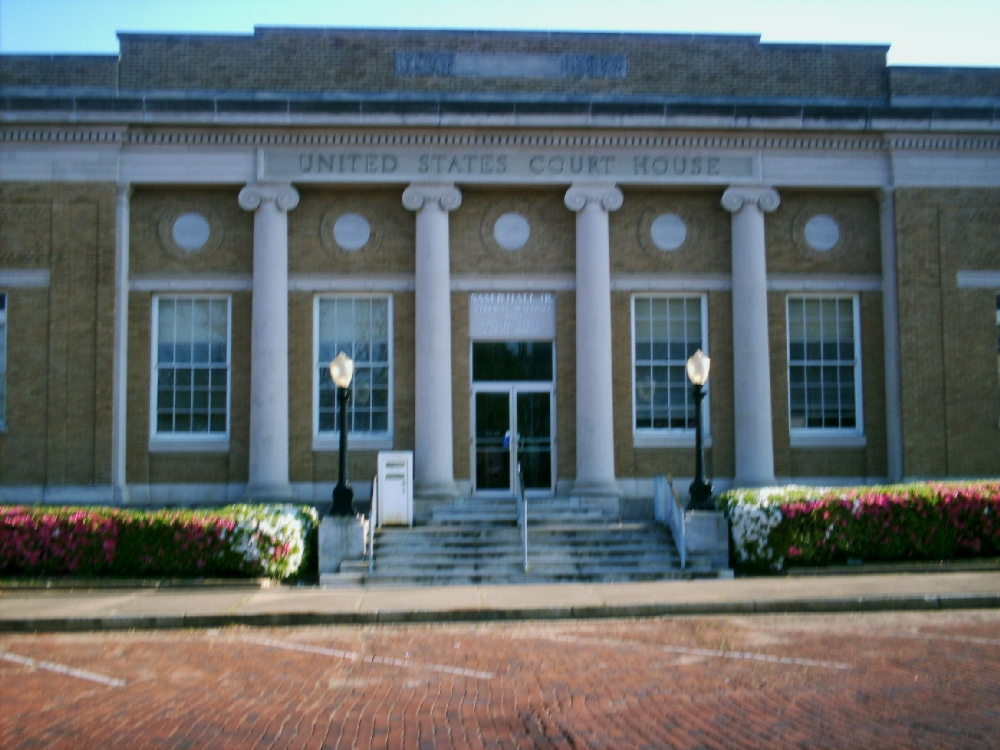
In the 2000s, the Sam B. Hall Jr. U.S. Court House became one of the busiest federal courts because of a high number of patent suits, the second-highest total in the nation.

Marshall is about 150 miles (240 km) east of Dallas and 40 miles (64 km) west of Shreveport, Louisiana. It is closer to the capitals of Arkansas [[[Little Rock]], 217 miles (349 km)] and Mississippi [ Jackson, 256 miles (412 km)]) than to the capital of Texas (Austin, 275 miles (443 km)). The intersection of U.S. routes 59 and 80 and the intersection of U.S. 59 and Interstate 20 are within Marshall's city limits.

According to the United States Census Bureau, the city has an area of 29.7 square miles (76.8 km^{2}), of which 29.6 square miles (76.6 km^{2}) are land and 0.1 sq mi (0.2 km^{2}), or 0.22%, is covered by water.

The city is bisected along a north–south axis by East End Boulevard (US 59). The eastern half is bisected along an east–west axis by US 80, which east of its intersection with U.S. 59 is called Victory Drive and west of US 59 is named Grand Avenue. The Harrison County Airport and Airport Baseball Park are south of Victory Drive, off of Warren Drive.

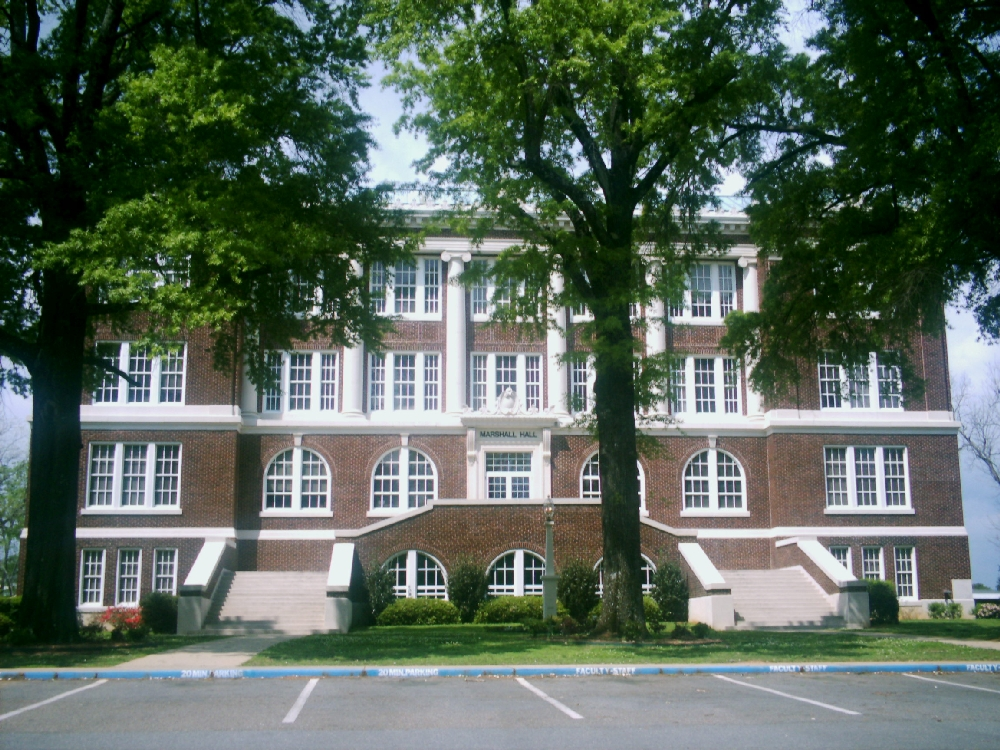
East Texas Baptist University

To the west of U.S. Route 59, south of Pinecrest Drive, are older suburbs; north of Pinecrest Drive, the oldest portion of the city stretches northward over seven hills. This portion of the city radiates out from downtown, which centers on the Old Harrison County Courthouse in Peter Whetstone Square. Immediately north of the square is the Ginocchio National Historic District, where the city's Amtrak station is. This region of the city is bisected along an east–west axis by Grand Avenue (U.S. Route 80). Spreading out from downtown is a belt of antebellum and Victorian homes centered on Rusk and Houston streets.

West of downtown are some of the oldest African-American neighborhoods in Texas, centered on Wiley College. North of Grand Avenue (US 80) are neighborhoods built largely by employees of the Texas and Pacific Railway. In addition to the Ginocchio National Historic District, this part of the city is home to East Texas Baptist University and four historic cemeteries: Marshall Cemetery, Powder Mill Cemetery, Greenwood Cemetery, and Marshall Hebrew Cemetery.

=== Climate ===
Marshall has a humid subtropical climate, characterized by hot summers and fairly mild winters. On average, Marshall receives 51.34 in (1,304 mm) of precipitation per year. The precipitation is relatively evenly spread throughout the year, with only July receiving less than 3.5 in (89 mm) on average.

In the spring, severe weather is not uncommon, and tornadoes have hit the city in the past, including an F2 that struck the south side of town in 2000, wiping out a Domino's Pizza on US Highway 59.

Summers in Marshall are hot and humid, with average high temperatures above 86 °F (30 °C) from June through September. Temperatures above 100 °F (38 °C) are not uncommon, with a highest recorded temperature of 112 °F (44 °C) on August 18, 1909.

In 2008, Hurricane Ike struck Marshall hard, with winds over 60 miles per hour (100 km/h). About 82% of Marshall's population was without power for at least 24 hours.

Climate data for Marshall, Texas (1991–2020 normals, extremes 1893–present)
Month	Jan	Feb	Mar	Apr	May	Jun	Jul	Aug	Sep	Oct	Nov	Dec	Year
Record high °F (°C)	87 (31)	90 (32)	96 (36)	97 (36)	100 (38)	106 (41)	108 (42)	112 (44)	108 (42)	101 (38)	88 (31)	85 (29)	112 (44)
Mean daily maximum °F (°C)	57.1 (13.9)	61.5 (16.4)	68.7 (20.4)	76.3 (24.6)	83.3 (28.5)	90.2 (32.3)	93.9 (34.4)	94.2 (34.6)	88.3 (31.3)	78.3 (25.7)	67.2 (19.6)	58.9 (14.9)	76.5 (24.7)
Daily mean °F (°C)	45.1 (7.3)	49.1 (9.5)	56.2 (13.4)	63.6 (17.6)	71.7 (22.1)	79.0 (26.1)	82.3 (27.9)	82.3 (27.9)	76.0 (24.4)	65.1 (18.4)	54.7 (12.6)	46.9 (8.3)	64.3 (17.9)
Mean daily minimum °F (°C)	33.1 (0.6)	36.7 (2.6)	43.7 (6.5)	50.8 (10.4)	60.1 (15.6)	67.8 (19.9)	70.8 (21.6)	70.3 (21.3)	63.8 (17.7)	51.8 (11.0)	42.1 (5.6)	34.9 (1.6)	52.2 (11.2)
Record low °F (°C)	−5 (−21)	−13 (−25)	12 (−11)	26 (−3)	38 (3)	48 (9)	52 (11)	53 (12)	35 (2)	23 (−5)	14 (−10)	3 (−16)	−13 (−25)
Average precipitation inches (mm)	4.20 (107)	3.98 (101)	5.07 (129)	4.78 (121)	4.62 (117)	4.66 (118)	3.65 (93)	3.05 (77)	3.50 (89)	4.67 (119)	4.25 (108)	4.91 (125)	51.34 (1,304)
Average snowfall inches (cm)	0.3 (0.76)	0.4 (1.0)	0.1 (0.25)	0.0 (0.0)	0.0 (0.0)	0.0 (0.0)	0.0 (0.0)	0.0 (0.0)	0.0 (0.0)	0.0 (0.0)	0.0 (0.0)	0.0 (0.0)	0.8 (2.0)
Average precipitation days (≥ 0.01 in)	9.0	9.1	9.3	7.4	8.7	7.8	6.7	5.9	6.2	7.0	7.8	9.3	94.2
Average snowy days (≥ 0.1 in)	0.2	0.2	0.2	0.0	0.0	0.0	0.0	0.0	0.0	0.0	0.0	0.1	0.7
Source: NOAA

== Demographics ==
Historical population
Census	Pop.	Note	%±
1850	1,189		—
1860	4,000		236.4%
1870	1,920		−52.0%
1880	5,624		192.9%
1890	7,207		28.1%
1900	7,855		9.0%
1910	11,452		45.8%
1920	14,271		24.6%
1930	16,203		13.5%
1940	18,410		13.6%
1950	22,327		21.3%
1960	23,846		6.8%
1970	22,937		−3.8%
1980	24,921		8.6%
1990	23,682		−5.0%
2000	23,935		1.1%
2010	23,523		−1.7%
2020	23,392		−0.6%
U.S. Decennial Census; Texas Almanac: 1850–2000

=== 2020 census ===
As of the 2020 census, Marshall had a population of 23,392. The median age was 34.8 years; 24.3% of residents were under 18 and 16.4% were 65 or older. For every 100 females, there were 90.4 males, and for every 100 females 18 and over, there were 86.7 males 18 and over.

Of the 8,502 households in Marshall, 33.1% had children under 18 living in them, 38.4% were married-couple households, 19.6% were households with a male householder and no spouse or partner present, and 36.1% were households with a female householder and no spouse or partner present. About 30.9% of all households were made up of individuals, and 13.4% had someone living alone who was 65 or older.

The city had 9,850 housing units, of which 13.7% were vacant. The homeowner vacancy rate was 2.3% and the rental vacancy rate was 8.8%. About 90.2% of residents lived in urban areas, while 9.8% lived in rural areas.

Racial composition as of the 2020 census
Race	Number	Percent
White	9,811	41.9%
Black or African American	8,449	36.1%
American Indian and Alaska Native	286	1.2%
Asian	205	0.9%
Native Hawaiian and other Pacific Islander	13	0.1%
Some other race	2,852	12.2%
Two or more races	1,776	7.6%
Hispanic or Latino (of any race)	4,994	21.3%

Per the U.S. Census Bureau's 2018 estimates, the city had an owner-occupied housing rate of 60.9% and an average of 2.78 people resided within Marshall's households from 2014 to 2018.

=== 2000 census ===
At the census of 2000, 23,935 people, 8,730 households, and 6,032 families resided in the city. The population density was 809.5 inhabitants per square mile (312.5/km^{2}). The 9,923 housing units averaged 335.6 per square mile (129.6/km^{2}). Of the 8,730 households, 32.2% had children under 18 living with them, 46.4% were married couples living together, 19.0% had a female householder with no husband present, and 30.9% were not families. About 28.0% of all households were made up of individuals, and 14.0% had someone living alone who was 65 or older. The average household size was 2.55, and the average family size was 3.12.

In the city, the age distribution was 26.1% under 18, 13.4% from 18 to 24, 24.6% from 25 to 44, 20.3% from 45 to 64, and 15.5% who were 65 or older. The median age was 34 years. For every 100 females, there were 87.9 males. For every 100 females 18 and over, there were 82.2 males.

The median income for a household was $43,783 and 20.2% of the city lived below the poverty line. In 2000, the median income for a household in the city was $30,335 and for a family was $37,438. Males had a median income of $30,146 versus $21,027 for females. The per capita income for the city was $15,491. About 17.8% of families and 22.8% of the population were below the poverty line, including 32.5% of those under 18 and 15.1% of those 65 or over.

=== Religion ===
According to Sperling's BestPlaces, a little over 60% of Marshall's population are religious. Baptists and Methodists are the largest Christian groups in Marshall (39.3% and 6.1%, respectively). Following, the Roman Catholic Church is the third-largest Christian body in the city (5.6%). Pentecostals, Presbyterians, Anglicans/Episcopalians, the Latter-Day Saints, and Lutherans are the remainder. Christians of other faiths accounted for a total of 5.4% of the religious demographic. Less than 1% of Marshall's non-Christian inhabitants were Jewish, Muslim, or followed an eastern faith.

Of the Baptist population in Marshall, the largest denominations as of 2020 are the predominantly African American National Baptist Convention USA and the National Baptist Convention of America, the Southern Baptist Convention, and the Baptist General Convention of Texas. The United Methodist Church was the largest Methodist denomination, and Pentecostals were divided between the Assemblies of God USA and Oneness (non-Trinitarian) United Pentecostal Church International. The Presbyterian Church USA is the largest Presbyterian denomination, and Anglicans and Episcopalians were affiliated with the Episcopal Church in the United States.

== Economy ==
Marshall's economy is diversified and includes services such as insurance claims processing at Health Care Service Corporation, also known as BlueCross BlueShield of Texas, education at several institutes of higher learning, manufacturing such as wood kitchen cabinets at Republic Industries, shotgun cartridges at Rio Ammunition, and pottery at several manufacturers. Tourism is also an important industry, with about one million tourists visiting the city each year.

== Government ==
=== Local government ===
The City of Marshall has a council–manager form of municipal government, with all governmental powers resting in a legislative body called the City Council. The council passes all city laws and ordinances, adopts budgets, determines city policy, and appoints city officials, including the city manager, who serves as the executive of the city government and is in charge of enforcing city laws and administering the city's various departments.

=== City council ===
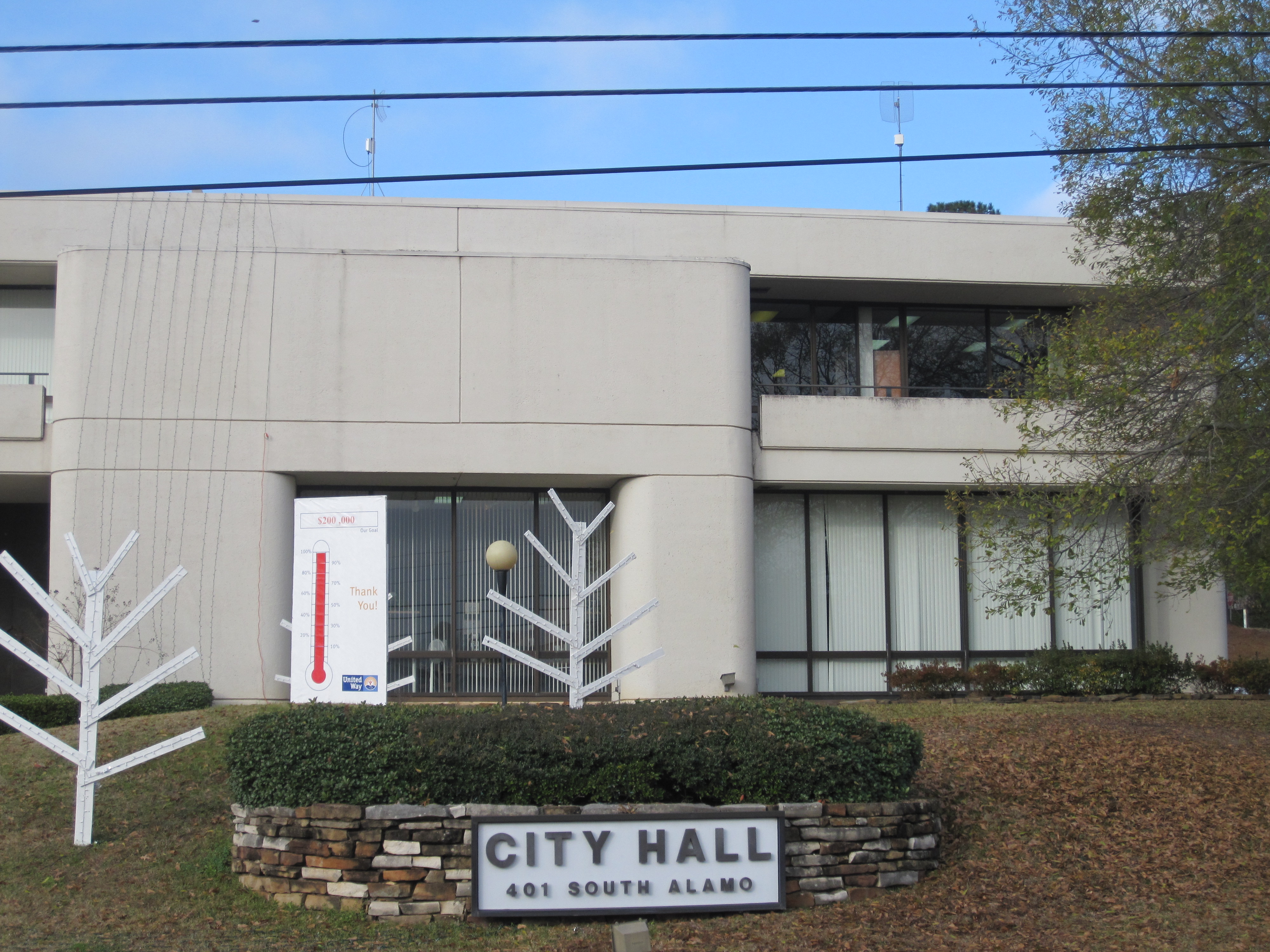
City Hall in Marshall

The city council has seven members, each elected from a single-member district. Districts 1−4 divide the city into four districts, and the districts 5−7 divide the city into three districts that overlay Districts 1−4. So, every location in the city falls in two districts, one from each set. Each council member is elected to a two-year term. Districts 1−4 hold elections in odd-numbered years and districts 5−7 in even years; elections are held in the spring.

After each election, the city council selects a council member to serve as chairman, generically called a mayor, until after the next year's election. If no one files to run against a council member, as happened with District 1 in 2005, the council member is reinstated and an election for that district is not held that year.

The city council meets on the second and fourth Thursdays of each month. Additional special sessions may be called or regular meetings canceled. The council holds a public forum before each regular session providing citizens the opportunity to address the commission for two minutes without advance notice; with notice, additional time may be scheduled. The council meetings are broadcast on radio and on the local government-access television, public-access television cable TV station.

==== Council/commission members ====
District	2022 Council	2015 Commission	2012 Commission	2010 Commission	2007 Commission	2002 Commission	1999 Commission
District 1	Marvin Bonner	Gloria Moon	Gloria Moon	Gloria Moon	Katie Jones	Katie Jones	Jean Birmingham
District 2	Leo Morris	Michael Mitchell	Zephaniah Timmins	Zephaniah Timmins	Zephaniah Timmins	Alonza Williams	Alonza Williams
District 3	Jennifer Truelove	Eric J. Neal (mayor)	John Flowers	Buddy Power	Ed Carlile	Chris Horsley	Chris Horsley
District 4	Amy Ware (mayor)	LaDarius Carter	Bill Marshall	Jack Hester	Jack Hester	Jack Hester	Audrey Kariel (mayor)
District 5	Reba Godfrey	Vernia Calhoun	Charlie Oliver	Charlie Oliver	John Wilborn	John Wilborn	John Wilborn
District 6	Amanda Abraham	Larry Hurta	Garrett Boersma	Chris Paddie	Michael McMurry	Bryan Partee	Michael Smith
District 7	Micah Fenton	Doug Lewis	Ed Smith (mayor)	William Buddy Power (mayor)	Ed Smith (mayor)	Ed Smith (mayor)	Martha Robb

==== Municipal services ====
Management of the city and coordination of city services are provided by:

Office	Officeholder
City manager	Greg Smith
Fire chief	David Rainwater
Police chief	Cliff Carruth

=== State government ===
Marshall is represented in the Texas Senate by Republican Bryan Hughes, District 1, and in the Texas House of Representatives by Republican Jay Dean, District 9.

The Texas Department of Criminal Justice operates the Marshall District Parole Office in Marshall.

=== Federal government ===
Texas's United States senators are Republicans John Cornyn and Ted Cruz. Marshall is in Texas's 1st congressional district, represented by Republican Nathaniel Moran.

The United States Postal Service operates the Marshall Post Office.

== Education ==
Marshall Independent School District is the sole school district covering the city limits, with approximately 6,000 students at eight campuses.

Trinity Episcopal School serves students from preschool through eighth grade at two campuses.

=== Higher education ===
More than 3,500 students annually attend colleges in the city: East Texas Baptist University, Wiley University, Texas State Technical College-Marshall, and Panola College-Marshall.

Panola College is the assigned community college for the majority of Harrison County, Marshall included, according to the Texas Education Code.

Wiley University is one of the oldest historically black institutions in the United States. It was the setting of the film The Great Debaters, which depicted Wiley College's debate team's struggle for racial equality. The team challenged Harvard University's debate team on the national circuit. In reality, Melvin B. Tolson's 1935 debate team, which included civil rights leader James Farmer, debated and defeated that year's Pi Kappa Delta Forensic Society's national champions, the University of Southern California.

== Media ==
The city has one newspaper, The Marshall News Messenger, a subsidiary of the nearby Longview newspaper. Marshall is home to three radio stations.

=== Television ===
Marshall has an ABC news office. The city is within the reception area of broadcasters based in Shreveport, Louisiana: KTBS (ABC), KSLA (CBS), KMSS (FOX), KTAL (NBC), KPXJ (The CW), KSHV-TV (My Network TV), and KLTS (Louisiana Public Broadcasting). Nearby Longview is within the reception of both the Shreveport and Tyler, Texas, media markets.

The local cable company, Sparklight Communications (formerly Cobridge Communications), provides public-access television channels that show local football games produced by KMHT radio, and meetings of the city council and county commission (both live and replayed), as well as streaming audio from KMHT. Marshall is also the home of the weekly podcast "Beyond the Pine Curtain".

=== Radio ===
Marshall shares the radio market with Longview.

== Transportation ==
=== Major highways and interstates in Marshall ===
- U.S. Highway 80
- U.S. Highway 59
- State Highway Loop 390
- Interstate 20

Marshall is served by two taxicab companies. The Harrison County Airport is located in Marshall.

Ongoing expansion of Interstate 69 from Indianapolis, Indiana, to Victoria, Texas, will create Interstate 369 branching off from Tenaha, Texas, and go north to Texarkana, Texas, using U.S. Highway 59 via Marshall.

=== Passenger rail ===
- Amtrak's daily Texas Eagle train leaves at 7:30 pm for St. Louis and Chicago. The Texas Eagle leaves for Dallas, Austin, and San Antonio at 7:50 am, and continues to Los Angeles three days a week.

== Sites of interest ==
- Memorial City Hall, East Houston Street
- The Ginocchio/Harrison County Historical Museum, North Washington Street at Ginocchio Street
- Texas and Pacific Railway Depot, North Washington Street at Ginocchio Street
- Hotel Marshall (tallest building in Marshall), 210 West Houston Street
- Starr Family Home State Historic Site, 407 West Travis Street
- Michelson Museum of Art, 216 North Bolivar Street
- Old Harrison County Courthouse, Whetstone Square
- Joe Weisman & Company (the first department store in Texas), 211 North Washington Street

== Notable landmarks ==
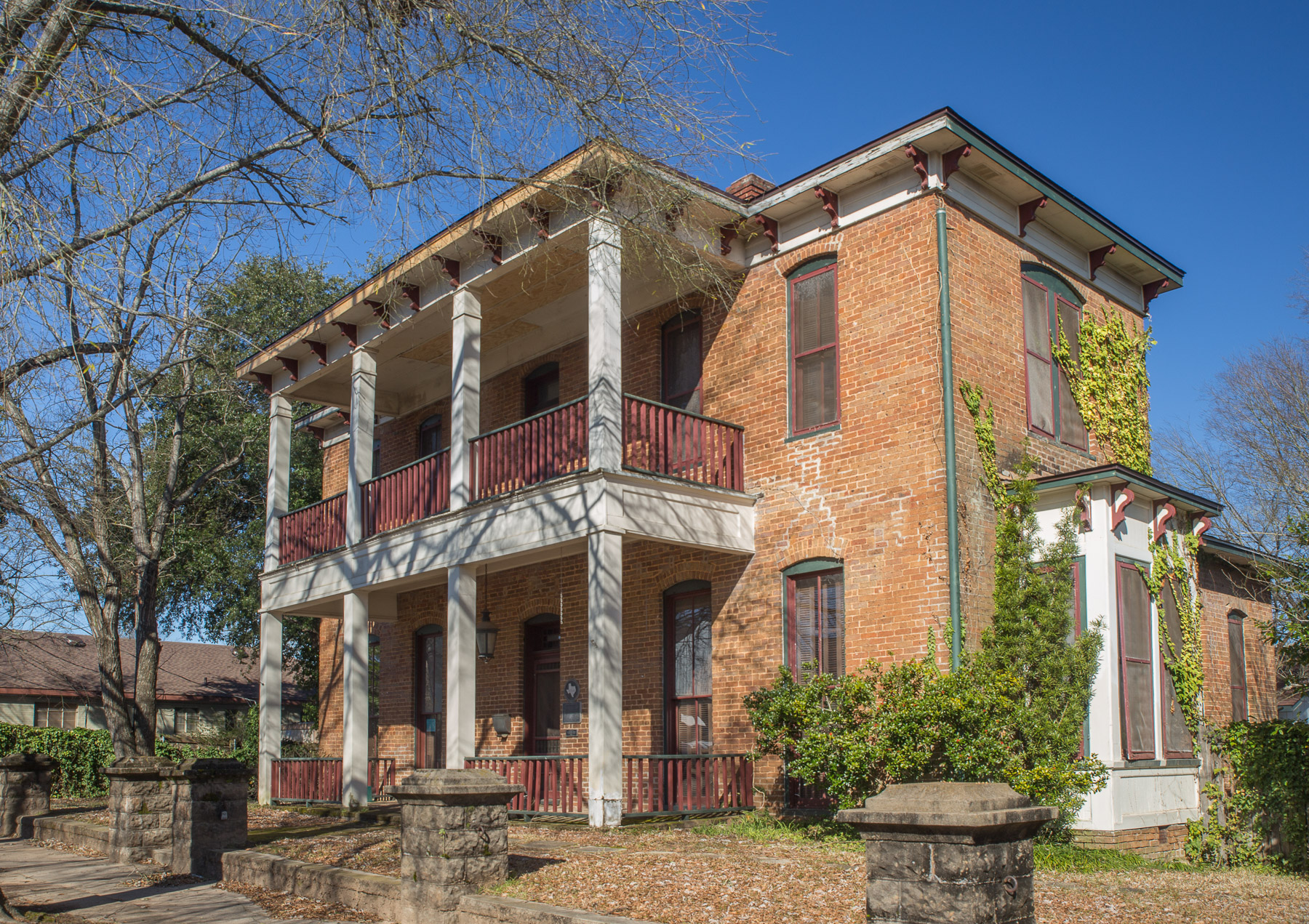
Hagerty House

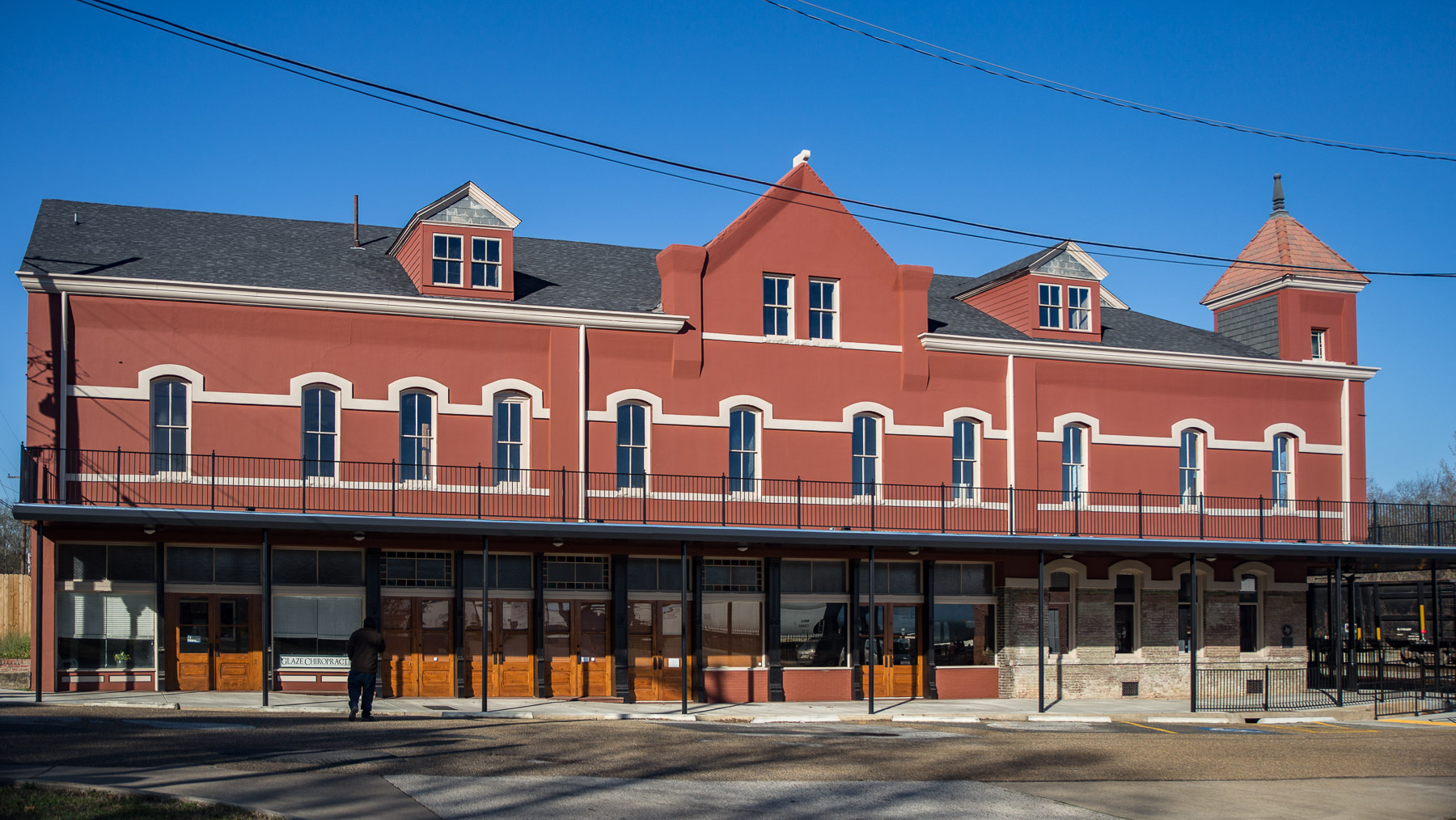
Ginocchio Historic District

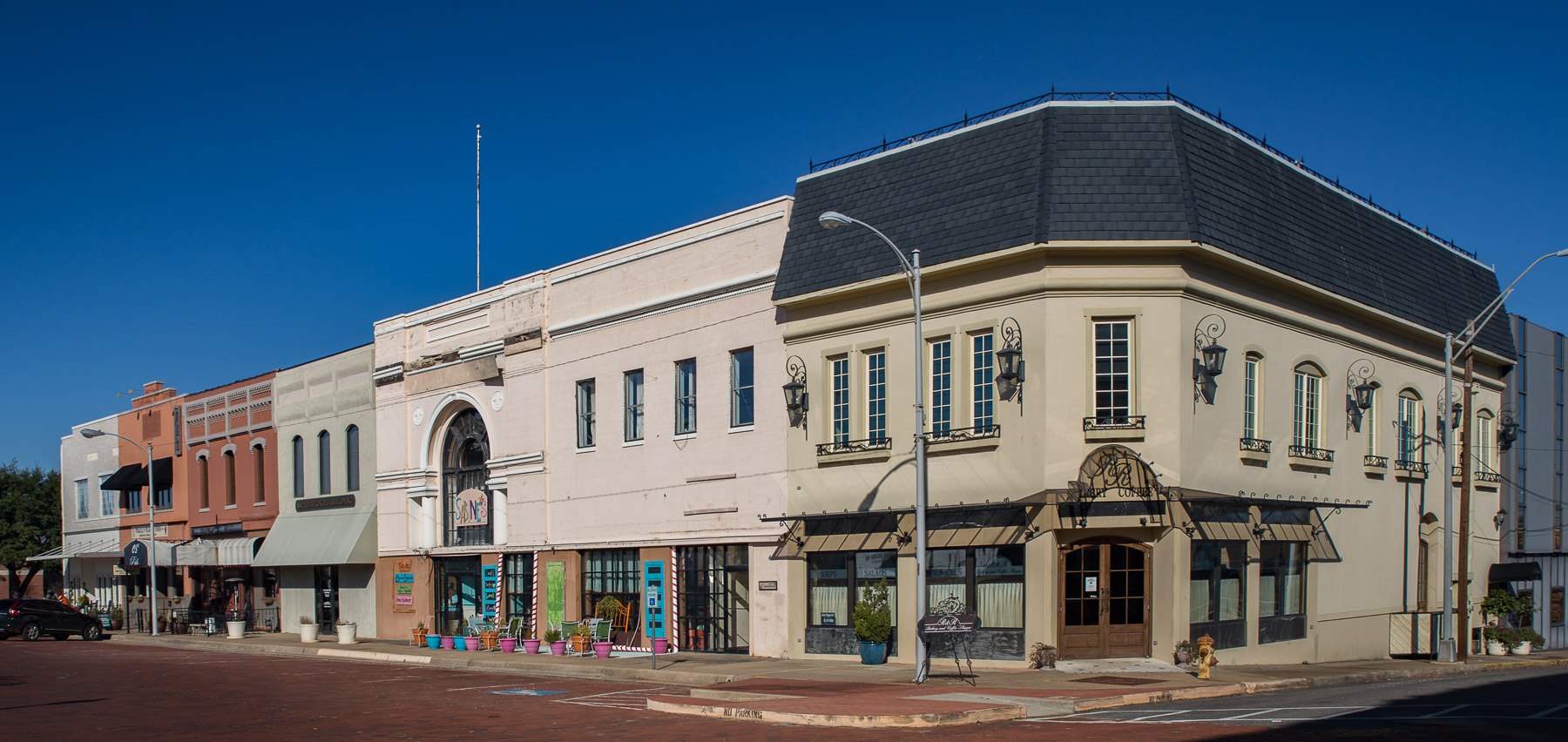
Downtown Marshall Texas

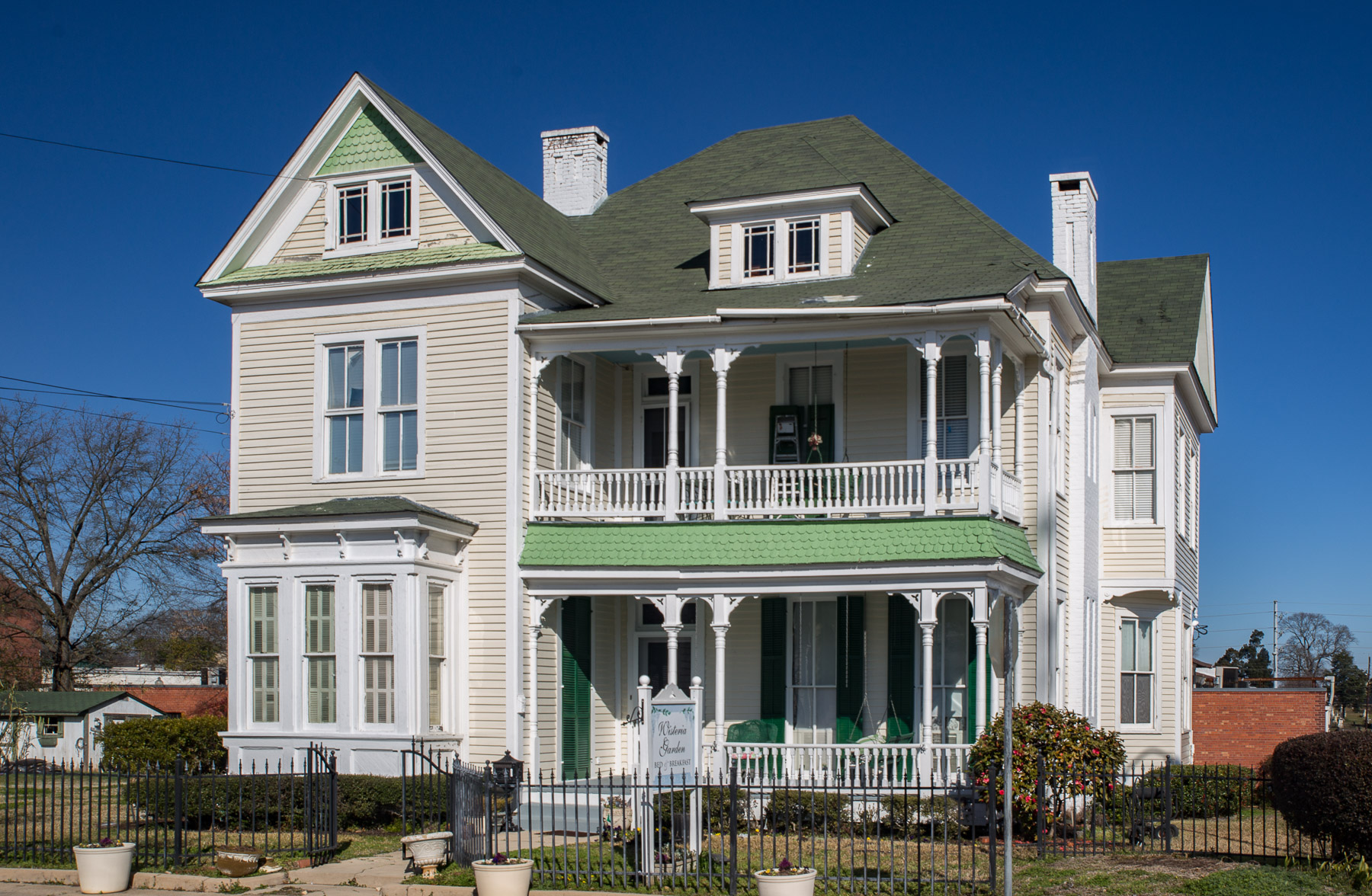
Sam Wood House

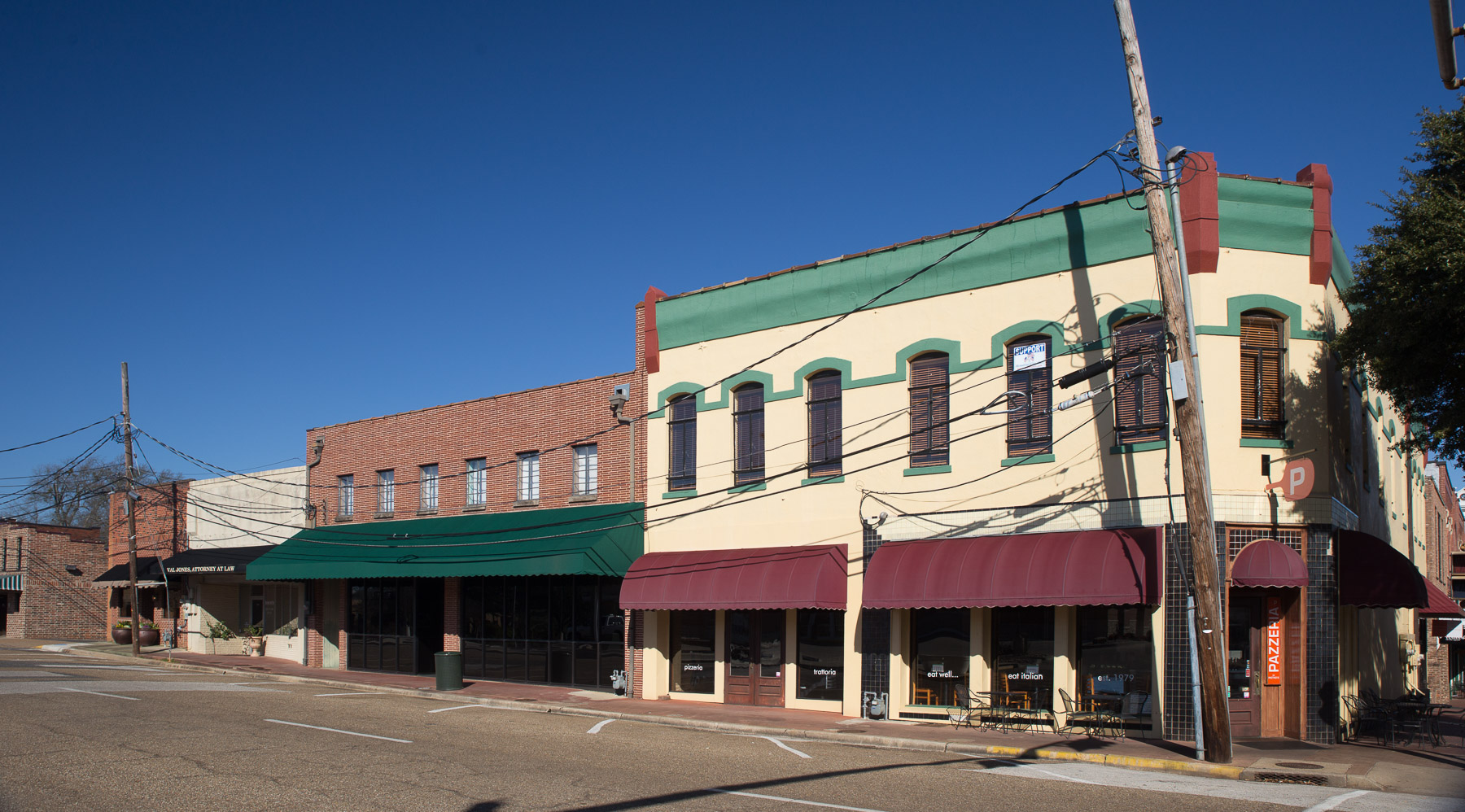
Downtown Marshall Texas

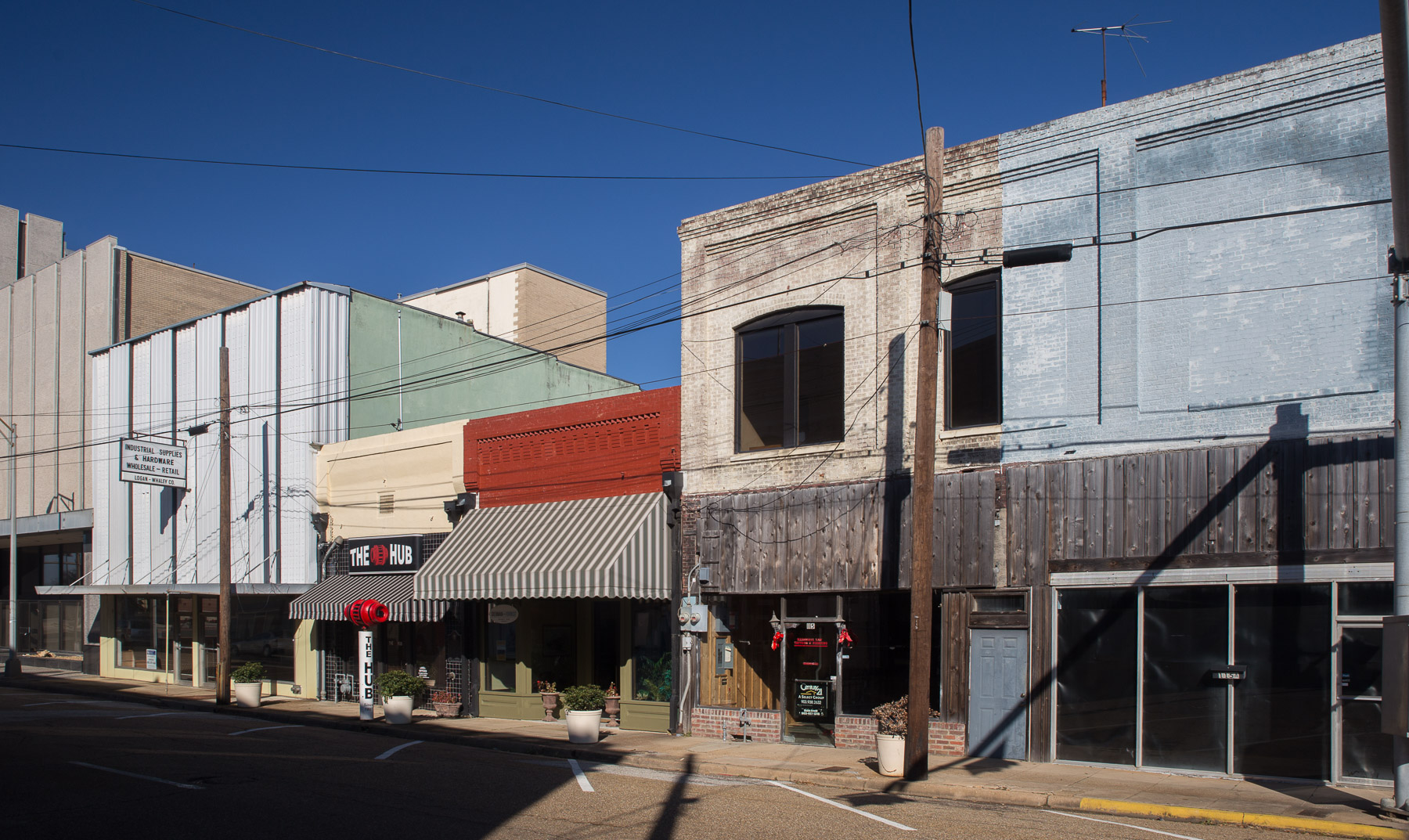
Downtown Marshall Texas

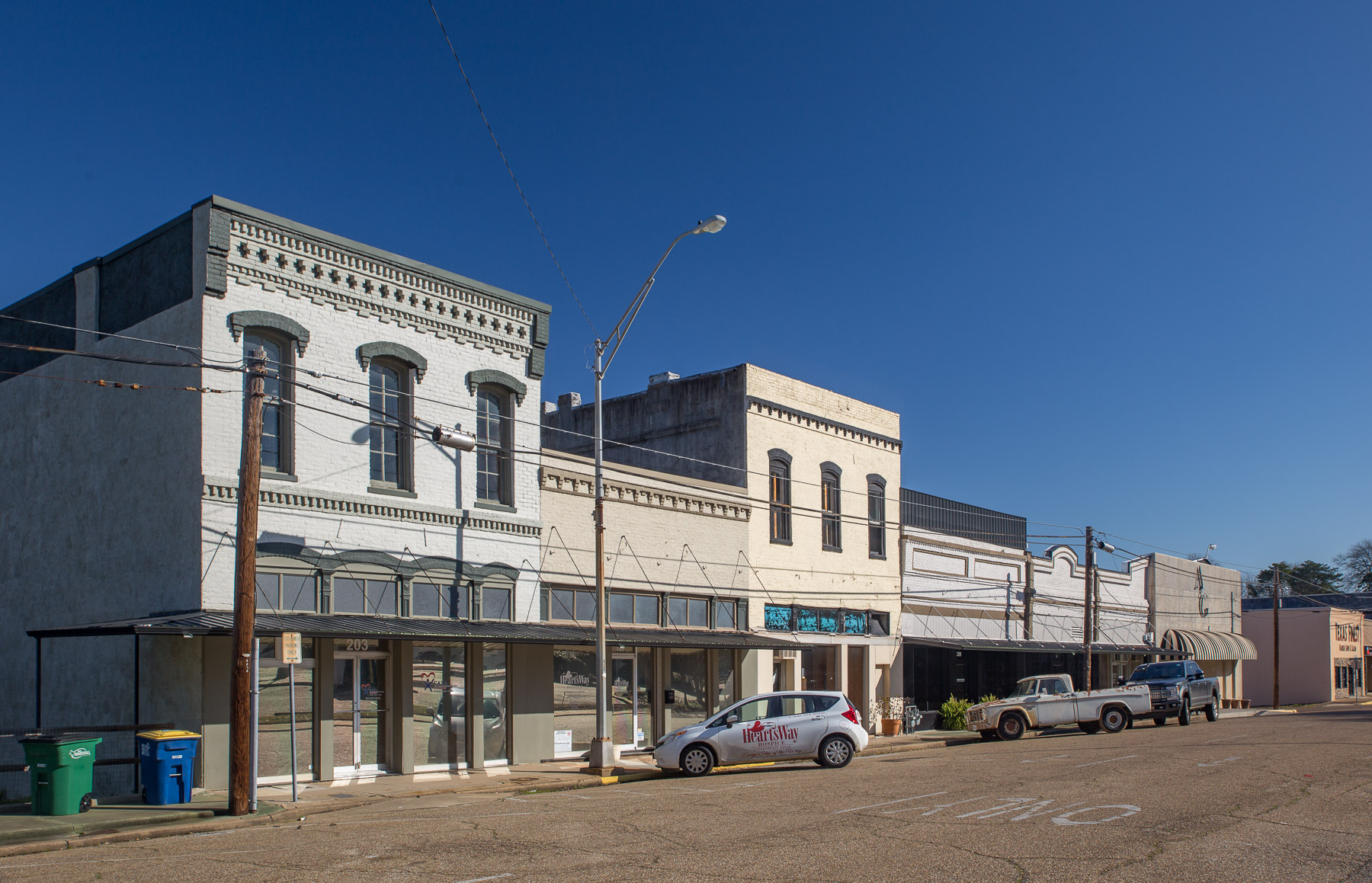
Downtown Marshall Texas

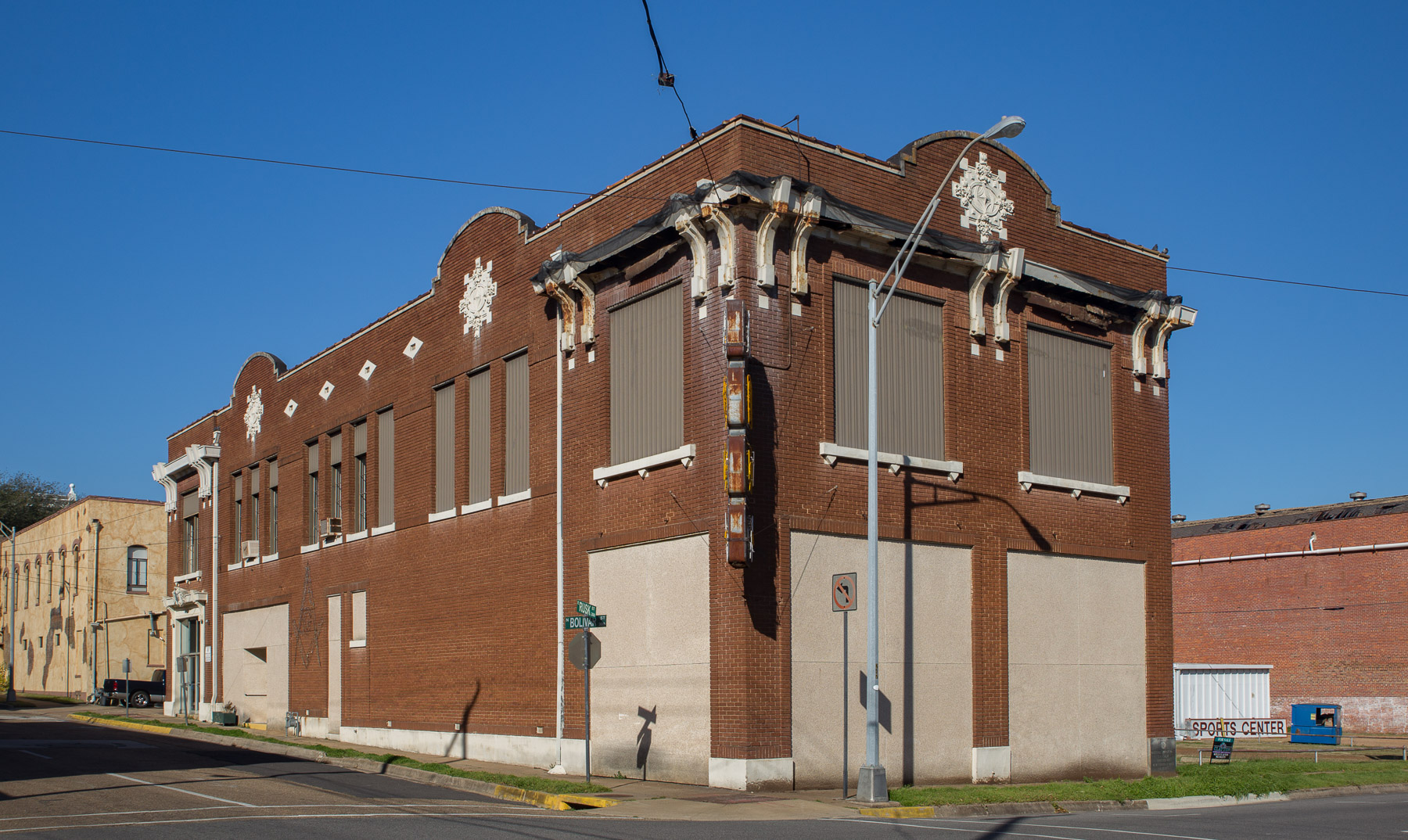
Masonic Lodge

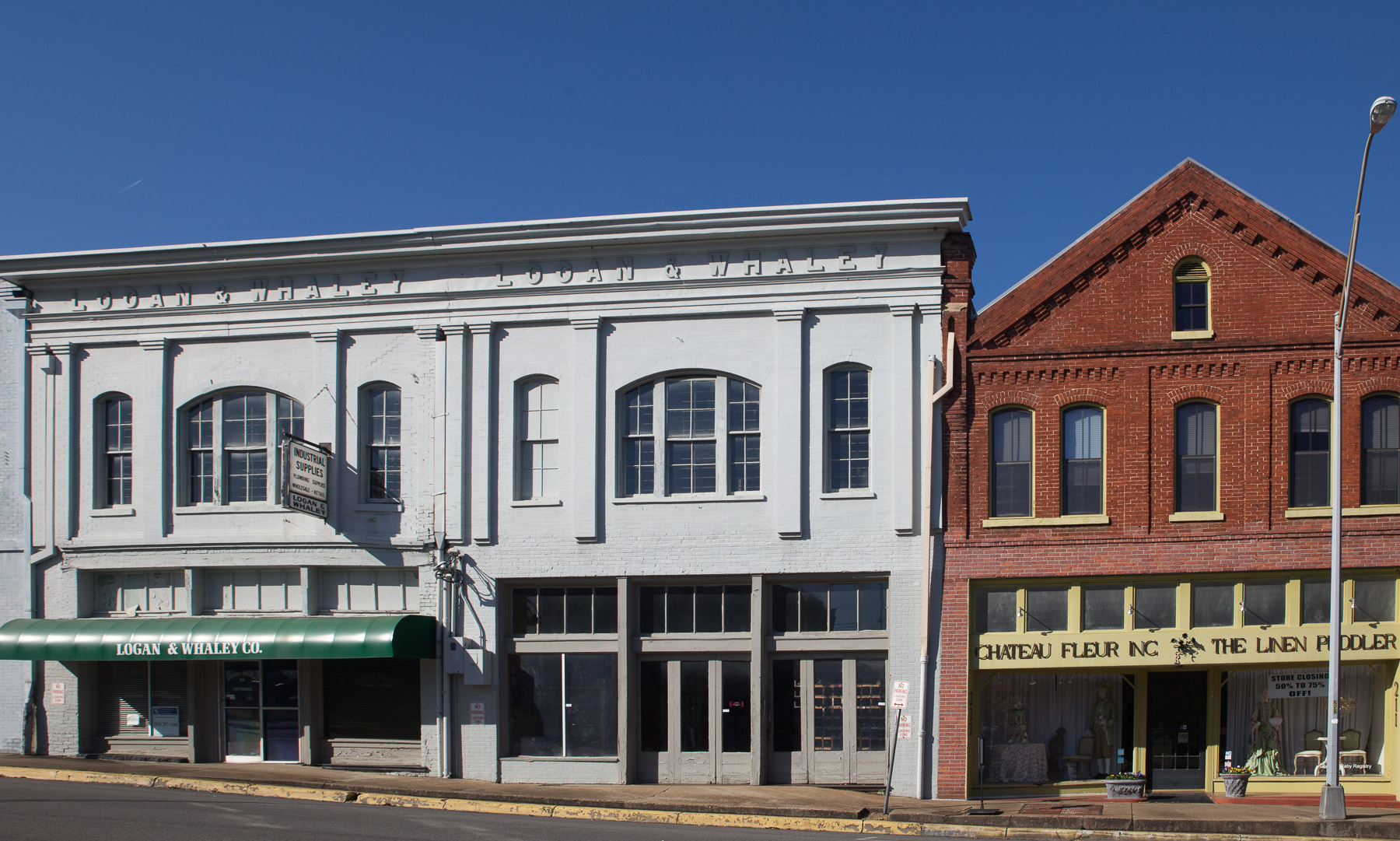
Downtown Marshall Texas

== See also ==
- List of museums in East Texas
- Patent troll
- Patent Litigation
