= Rio Ammunition =

Shotgun shell manufacturer

Rio Outdoors Corp.
- Industry: Manufacturer of ammunition components
- Headquarters: 1402 South Custer Road, Ste 301, McKinney,TX 75072
- Products: Shotgun shells
- Parent: FN Browning Group
- Website: www.riooutdoors.us

Rio Ammunition, now Rio Outdoors Corp, manufactures shotgun shells at a factory in Spain and Italy. This former subsidiary of the Spanish explosives firm MAXAM, a member of the Sporting Arms and Ammunition Manufacturers' Institute (SAAMI). MAXAM originated as Unión Española de Explosivos (UEE) in 1896, and began marketing shotgun ammunition in the United States in 2002. The Rio Ammunition plant in McEwen, Tennessee, was damaged by an explosion in 2014. The Texas factory began operations in 2015 loading locally manufactured shotgun shells with smokeless powder, wads, primers, and shot manufactured in Vitoria-Gasteiz. The labor pool for the Texas manufacturing site includes skilled personnel formerly employed at the nearby Longhorn Army Ammunition Plant closed in 1997. Rio Outdoors produces conventional target and hunting ammunition plus specialized cartridges for law enforcement use. Non-lead hunting cartridges are loaded with steel or bismuth shot. Combined production of factories in Spain, Italy, the United Kingdom and Turkey is estimated at 500,000,000 shotgun shells annually.
