= White Citizens Parties =

White Citizens Parties were autonomous local parties (often county-based) in the Southern United States, that served as the public face and often directly as what would today be considered Political Action Committees for racist organizations like the Ku Klux Klan. These groups flourished after Reconstruction when the Union withdrew its troops from the South and the Democratic Party regained control from Republicans. The Citizens Parties were pivotal in establishing and maintaining Jim Crow legislation at the local level. They offered coordinated support of Democrats through the one-party South until it began opposing segregation in the later 20th century.

Over time, many of the parties were subsumed into the Democratic Party. While the term White Citizens Party is common, these groups were never a cohesive third party.

== Local parties ==
In Harrison County, Texas, which had been represented by African Americans in the state house, the Citizen's Party of Harrison County came to power as Democrats increasingly regained control after the Reconstruction era ended and restored white supremacy. Jonathan D. Rudd was a leader in organizing the party.

Charleston, South Carolina had a Citizens Conservative Party. It sought the support of the German immigrant community to the Democratic Party cause.

== End of Citizens Parties and segregation ==
The Civil Rights Movement overcame the system that supported the White Citizens Parties, and they have largely disappeared. Some survive under the name Citizens Party (no link with the Citizens Party of Barry Commoner) or Council of Conservative Citizens, and occasionally field serious local candidates with positions to the right of their Republican and Democratic colleagues. By the late 20th century, conservative southern whites largely shifted into the Republican Party.

== See also ==
- Perry v. Cyphers
- Segregation Academy
- White Municipal Party
- White Citizens Councils
