= Perry v. Cyphers =

Perry v. Cyphers 186 F.2d 608 (5th Cir. 1951) was a 1951 decision of the United States Court of Appeals for the Fifth Circuit that struck down Jim Crow legislation in Harrison County, Texas.

== History ==
In Harrison County, which had been represented by African Americans in the state house, the Citizen's Party of Harrison County came to power as Democrats increasingly regained control after the Reconstruction era ended and restored white supremacy.

Specifically, in 1923, the Texas law singled out African-American Texan voters, and barred them "from voting in the Democratic Party primary." In 1878, the first White Citizens Party was formed in Harrison County by Amory Starr (1847-1906) and other Texas and Pacific Railroad officers. Fred Lewis (1912-2002), a prominent educator, became the manager of Ruth Starr Blake's estate. Mr. Lewis was an NAACP officer and civil rights activist. He administered Ruth Starr Blake's estate after he returned from World War II. Lewis was influential in spearheading the case, Perry v. Cyphers, to the Fifth Circuit Court of Appeals. He raised funds and enlisted the cooperation of statewide NAACP leadership. "In 1951, the court decision ended the white primary system and restored the vote to African Americans in Harrison County."

It was part of a larger effort by the NAACP to protect black voting rights.
