= Pulaski, Texas =

Ghost town in Texas, US

Pulaski
- Ghost town
- Location in Texas
- Coordinates: 32.22980600°N 94.22920200°W
- Country: United States
- State: Texas
- County: Panola

Pulaski, formerly Walnut Bluff, is a ghost town in Panola County, Texas, United States.

== History ==
Pulaski is situated on the banks of the Sabine River. It was settled in the mid-1830s, and was originally called Walnut Bluff. From 1842 to 1842, it served as the county seat for Harrison County, Texas. A post office operated from 1847 to 1867. The town declined after the county seat was moved to Carthage. During the American Civil War, it became an inland port for cotton after the Capture of New Orleans. By 1900, Pulaski was abandoned.
