= George Dawson (author) =

American writer (1898–2001)

- Born: January 19, 1898; Marshall, Texas, U.S.
- Died: July 5, 2001 (aged 103); Dallas, Texas, U.S.
- Children: 7

George Dawson (January 19, 1898 – July 5, 2001) was called "America's favorite poster child for literacy" after learning to read at the age of 98. His life story, Life Is So Good, was published in 2000.

A Texas middle school was named in his honor in 2002; twenty years later the same school placed his autobiography under review because it dealt with civil rights topics, which some community members argued were inappropriate for inclusion in a 7th-grade curriculum.

== Early and mid-life ==
Dawson was born in Marshall, Texas, on January 19, 1898 as the first of five children, a farmer's son, and grandson and great-grandson of African-American slaves; his great-grandfather, (who escaped at some point in 1863), was a Union army soldier who was killed in action during the American Civil War. One of his earliest childhood memories, he later said, was watching a 17-year-old black boy being lynched after being "accused of impregnating a white girl." His job at a saw mill supported a large family. At the sawmill, his employer convinced him to sign an X on a paper he could not read, which he later surmised must have made some claim that he was ineligible for military service. After turning 21, he traveled extensively throughout the US, Canada, and Mexico; in 1928, after nine years of travel and work, he returned to find his family had moved away, leaving no clue as to their new home: "I wondered why they hadn’t let me know. Then again, how would they have found me? Even if they’d known where I was, I wouldn’t have been able to read their letter."

He married Elzenia Arnold, a literate woman, and they moved to Dallas, where Dawson began to work for the city in road repair. They went on to have seven children. Dawson helped them all with their homework, despite not knowing how to read. In 1938, he took a job at a dairy, where he worked until his retirement at the age of 65.

== Later life ==
In 1996, when Dawson was aged about 98, a man was making door-to-door visits on behalf of a local adult education program. Dawson overcame his initial reluctance to reveal his illiteracy, telling himself, "All your life you’ve wanted to read. Maybe this is why you’re still around." On first meeting instructor Carl Henry, a retired teacher, he learned that the oldest student to that time had been a woman in her fifties. Dawson learned to read and even went on to study for his GED at the age of 98.

Dawson died on July 5, 2001, at Baylor University Medical Center in Dallas after suffering a stroke in April.

== Fame ==
His autobiography, Life Is So Good (co-written with Richard Glaubman), was published in 2000 and received attention in the national media. Dawson appeared on Oprah and was featured in People magazine. He told his story in the June 2001 issue of the inspirational magazine Guideposts.

Dawson was posthumously honored in 2002 when the Carroll Independent School District named a middle school after him in Southlake. This same school subsequently placed his autobiography under review in August 2022, deeming topics such as "lynching, racism, segregation and civil rights" unsuitable instructional materials in a 7th-grade curriculum.
