= Texas State Highway Loop 49 =

Highway in Texas

State Highway Loop 49
- Open section of Loop 49 in red, future corridors and segments in blue

Route information
- Maintained by NET RMA
- Length: 32 mi (51 km)
- Existed: 1986–present

Major junctions
- CW end: US 69 near Lindale
- I-20 in Lindale; SH 110 near Lindale; SH 64 near Tyler; SH 31 in Tyler; SH 155 at Noonday; US 69 in Tyler
- CCW end: SH 110 near Whitehouse

Location
- Country: United States
- State: Texas
- Counties: Smith

Highway system
- Highways in Texas; Interstate; US; State; Former; Toll; Loops; Spurs; FM/RM; Park; Rec
← Loop 48	→ Loop 50

Loop 49 (also called Toll 49) is a currently 32-mile (51 km) circular freeway that, along with I-20, will encircle the city of Tyler and serve other various communities in Northeast Texas upon its completion. Routing of the loop north of I-20 bypasses Lindale to the west and passes by the west and south sides of Tyler south of I-20. The highway interconnects suburban areas and areas of potential development around Tyler with I-20 and provides local areas easier access to the Dallas–Fort Worth metroplex.

Currently, the route exists as an undivided two-lane highway stretching from US 69 near Lindale to SH 110 near Whitehouse. According to TxDOT, costs have exceeded $176 million, and the projected total cost for the completion of the route as a divided four-lane highway is still unknown. This proposed extension of Loop 49, the East Texas Hourglass (ETHG), planned as a divided four-lane highway between SH 110 and US 59 near Marshall, includes two additional spur highways and will run through Smith, Gregg, Upshur, and Harrison Counties. It is designed to ease congestion and provide faster connections between the cities of Tyler, Longview, and Marshall. The highway will adhere to Interstate highway standards. Loop 49 and the East Texas Hourglass are the first major projects of the North East Texas Regional Mobility Authority (NET RMA).

== Route description ==
Loop 49 begins at an intersection with US 69 north of Lindale. Proceeding south, the highway bypasses Lindale to the west, having interchanges with FM 16 and I-20. Continuing south through the western side of Tyler, Loop 49 has interchanges with SH 64 and SH 31 near Tyler Pounds Regional Airport. Traveling south, Loop 49 interchanges with SH 155 at Noonday. Turning east, Loop 49 meets US 69 on the south side of Tyler, and proceeds to its current terminus with SH 110 near Whitehouse.

== History ==

The route number was originally used for Spur 49 from SH 22 in Corsicana to the Corsicana State Orphans' home but was removed from the state highway system on August 4, 1966.

Signage originally planned for use along Loop 49 if the road had not been set up for tolling.

Plans to construct an outer loop around the city of Tyler, Texas began in the mid-1980s. The original plans called for a freeway to be built but Texas Department of Transportation (TxDOT) determined that there was a funding shortfall and the road would not likely be built until 2033 using traditional funding. In response, the NET RMA chose to build the highway as a tollway with an electronic toll system.

In August 2003, construction began on the first 5-mile (8.0 km) segment (called Segment 1) extending east from SH 155 (Frankston Highway) in Noonday to US 69 (Broadway Avenue) in south Tyler. The road is a two-lane undivided highway, which will ultimately be expanded to a four-lane divided highway. The grand opening of Loop 49 took place on August 17, 2006. Tolling began on November 27, 2006. Construction then continued east, with Segment 2, which extends 2.0 miles (3.2 km) from US 69 to FM 756 (Paluxy Drive), opening to traffic January 7, 2008. Due to a 2008 budget crisis at TxDOT, construction on additional sections of the tollway was delayed more than two years. In 2010, construction began on Segment 5, which extends 2.6 miles (4.2 km) from FM 756 to SH 110 in Whitehouse. This section of the tollway, which was funded by Proposition 14 highway bonds, approved by Texas voters in 2003, opened to traffic June 28, 2012 after nearly 29 months of construction, bringing the total length of the loop to 9.6 miles (15.4 km).

Construction on the western side of Loop 49 began with Segment 3A, which extends 5.9 miles (9.5 km) from SH 155 (Frankston Highway) to SH 31 (Chandler Highway). This segment was constructed using federal funds from the American Recovery and Reinvestment Act of 2009, after the Texas Transportation Commission approved its status as a stimulus project on March 5, 2009. TxDOT awarded a $37.9 million construction contract three months later on June 10, and construction began in August. Segment 3A opened to traffic November 9, 2012, after approximately 39 months of construction. In an effort to speed completion of the west side of Loop 49 and connect it to Interstate 20, the NET RMA approved a plan in August 2009 to develop Segment 3B, the longest section of the toll road at 9.7 miles (15.6 km), using a nontraditional "design/build" process. On October 28, 2010, the Texas Transportation Commission approved up to $90 million for the construction of Segment 3B through State Infrastructure Bank loans and a toll equity loan. Construction on Segment 3B began on January 21, 2011, and the segment opened to traffic on March 28, 2013, completing the 26-mile (42 km) loop from I-20 to SH 110.

On February 28, 2013, the Texas Transportation Commission voted to transfer ownership and maintenance of Loop 49 from TxDOT to the NET RMA.

Segment 4, also known as the Lindale Relief Route, stretches for 6.7 miles (10.8 km) from US 69 south to I-20, bypassing the city of Lindale to the west. The environmental coordination stage of planning, with various state and federal approvals was completed, with construction beginning in 2016, and the segment opening to traffic on November 7, 2018.

== Future ==
The future segments of the East Texas Hourglass are currently in the preliminary planning stages, with no completion timeline currently scheduled. Segment 6 is planned to complete the eastern portion of Loop 49, connecting SH 110 near Whitehouse to I-20 near the Smith-Gregg County line. Segment 6A is planned as a spur running from a junction between Loop 49 and FM 850 near New Chapel Hill to the current junction between US 271 and SH 155 northeast of Tyler. Segment 7 is planned to run northeast from I-20 to US 259 north of Longview. Segment 8 is planned to run from US 259 to US 59 north of Marshall. Segment 8A is planned as another spur running from a point east of a junction between Loop 49 and FM 2879 northeast of Longview to I-20 southeast of Longview.

== Exit list ==
County	Location	mi	km	Destinations	Notes
Smith		0.0	0.0	US 69 – Mineola, Lindale	Current clockwise terminus; at-grade intersection; opened November 2018
Smith		3.5	5.6	FM 16 – Van, Lindale	Interchange opened November 2018
Smith	Lindale	6.0	9.7	I-20 – Dallas, Shreveport	I-20 exit 553; former clockwise terminus
Smith		8.1	13.0	SH 110 – Van, Tyler	Clockwise exit and counterclockwise entrance
Smith		13.6	21.9	SH 64 – Canton, Tyler, Airport	
Smith	Tyler	16.2	26.1	SH 31 – Chandler, Tyler	
Smith	Noonday	22.0	35.4	SH 155 / County Road 192 – Tyler, Noonday, Frankston	
Smith		23.9	38.5	County Road 178	Counterclockwise exit and clockwise entrance
Smith		24.7	39.8	FM 2493 (Old Jacksonville Highway) – Tyler, Bullard	
Smith	Tyler	27.1	43.6	US 69 – Tyler, Jacksonville	
Smith		29.1	46.8	FM 756 (Paluxy Drive) – Tyler	
Smith		30.8	49.6	FM 2964 (Rhones Quarter Road) – Tyler	Counterclockwise exit and clockwise entrance
Smith		32.0	51.5	County Road 2170	At-grade intersection
Smith		32.1	51.7	SH 110	Current counterclockwise terminus; at-grade intersection
Smith				Loop 49 Toll north (Segment 6A) to SH 155 / US 271	Proposed interchange
Smith				SH 64	Proposed interchange
Smith				SH 31	Proposed interchange
Smith				I-20	Proposed interchange
Gregg				US 80	Proposed interchange
Upshur				SH 300	Proposed interchange
Gregg				US 259	Proposed interchange
Harrison				FM 2879	Proposed interchange
Harrison				Loop 49 Toll south (Segment 8A) to I-20	Proposed interchange
Harrison				FM 450	Proposed interchange
Harrison				FM 449	Proposed interchange
Harrison				SH 154	Proposed interchange
Harrison				US 59 / Future I-369	Proposed counterclockwise terminus
1.000 mi = 1.609 km; 1.000 km = 0.621 mi: Incomplete access; Proposed

== See also ==
- Loop 323, the inner loop around Tyler, built in the 1950s.
