= Harleton High School =

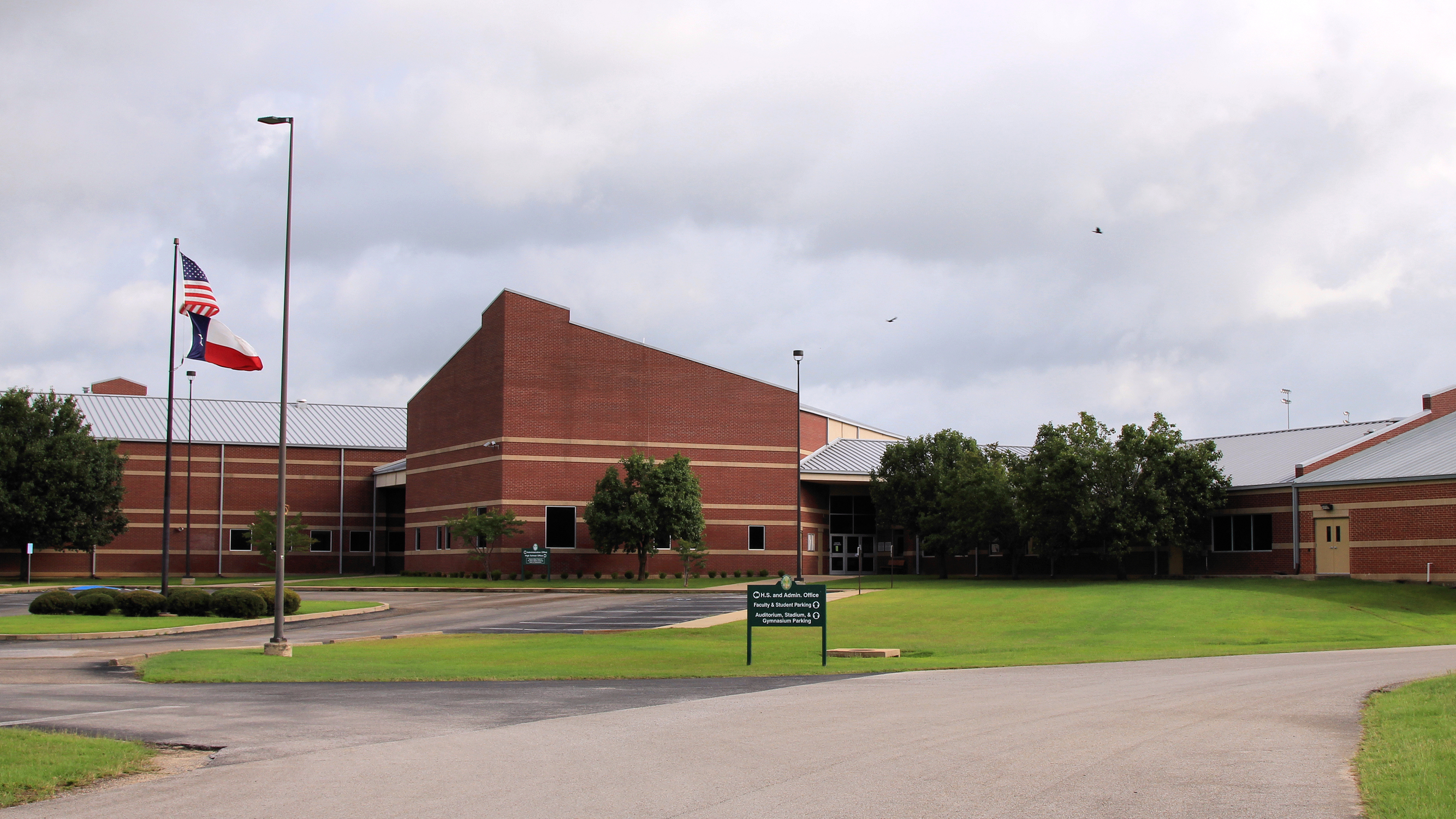

Location
- 17000 State Highway 154; Harleton, Texas 75651-0710; United States; 32.677176°N 94.571408°W

Information
- School type: Public high school
- School district: Harleton Independent School District
- Principal: Tonya Knowlton
- Staff: 23.66 (FTE)
- Grades: 9-12
- Enrollment: 227 (2023-2024)
- Student to teacher ratio: 9.59
- Colors: Forest green and gold
- Athletics conference: UIL Class AA
- Mascot: Wildcat/Lady Wildcat
- Website: Harleton High School website

Harleton High School is a public high school located in Harleton, Texas USA. It is part of the Harleton Independent School District which is located in northwestern Harrison County and classified as a 2A school by the UIL. In 2015, the school was rated "Met Standard" by the Texas Education Agency.

== Athletics ==
The Harleton Wildcats compete in the following sports -

- Baseball
- Basketball
- Cross Country
- Football
- Golf
- Softball
- Tennis
- Track and Field

=== State Titles ===
- Baseball -
  - 2023(2A)

=== State Finalists ===
- Baseball -
  - 1981(1A), 2005(1A), 2015(2A)
- Softball -
  - 2014(1A), 2015(2A), 2016(2A)

== Notable alumni ==
- Keyou Craver, former professional football player
- George E. Johnson, former professional basketball player
