= Texas State Highway Loop 390 =

State highway loop in Harrison County, Texas, United States

State Highway Loop 390

Route information
- Maintained by TxDOT
- Length: 10.907 mi (17.553 km)
- Existed: August 31, 1965–present

Major junctions
- West end: SH 43 in Marshall
- US 59 in Marshall
- East end: US 80 in Marshall

Location
- Country: United States
- State: Texas
- Counties: Harrison

Highway system
- Highways in Texas; Interstate; US; State; Former; Toll; Loops; Spurs; FM/RM; Park; Rec
← Loop 389	→ Loop 391

State Highway Loop 390 (Loop 390) is a state highway loop that forms a partial beltway within, but around, Marshall, Texas, United States.

== Route description ==
Loop 390 begins at an intersection with State Highway 43 (SH 43, West Pinecrest Drive) in western Marshall. There is little development along the route at first, before seeing an increase in between University Avenue and Farm to Market Road 3379 (FM 3379, Houston Street) near Wiley College. Loop 390 intersects U.S. Highway 80 (US 80, W. Grand Avenue), FM 449, and SH 154 just west of East Texas Baptist University. Just north of SH 154, Loop 390 starts to turn toward the east and runs near the city limits of Marshall. In northwest Marshall, the highway has a brief overlap with FM 1997 before meeting US 59 (East End Boulevard). Near County Road 2100, Loop 390 starts to turn towards the south and has an interchange with SH 43 (Karnack Highway) in the eastern part of the city. Loop 390 runs in a slight southeast direction before ending at an intersection with US 80 (Victory Drive) near the city's eastern edge.

The section of highway between SH 43 and US 80 in western Marshall is known locally as Martin Luther King Jr. Boulevard. The rest of the highway is known locally as Ernest F. Smith Parkway.

== History ==
Loop 390 was designated on August 31, 1965, running from I-20 southwest of Marshall and around the city before ending at I-20 southeast of the city. The section of highway between FM 3251 and US 80 was cancelled on September 14, 1990, with the mileage being transferred to FM 968. On January 28, 2005, the section of SH 154 between US 80 and SH 43 was re-designated as a part of Loop 390.

== Future ==
TxDOT currently plans to upgrade the section of Loop 390 between US 59 and US 80 in eastern Marshall as a part of I-369. The Interstate will join Loop 390 near Poplar Street/County Road 2116 and will continue past US 80 and rejoin US 59 south of Marshall near FM 2625. Loop 390 will be extended south from US 80 east of Marshall southward to I-20 and will be built to Interstate standards in anticipation of a future I-369 designation. US 59 is likely be relocated onto this new route when completed. The extension is slated to begin construction in early 2028.

== Junction list ==
The entire route is in Harrison County.

Location	mi	km	Destinations	Notes
Marshall	0.0	0.0	SH 43 (Pinecrest Drive) – Tatum, Marshall	West terminus
Marshall	1.2	1.9	FM 3379 west (Houston Street)	
Marshall	1.7	2.7	US 80 (W. Grand Avenue) – Longview, Marshall	
Marshall	1.8	2.9	FM 449 west / Hynson Springs Road	
Marshall	2.5	4.0	SH 154 west / Van Zandt Street – Gilmer, East Texas Baptist University	
Marshall	3.6	5.8	FM 1997 north – Woodlawn	Western end of FM 1997 overlap
Marshall	4.2	6.8	FM 1997 south – East Texas Baptist University	Eastern end of FM 1997 overlap
Marshall	5.8	9.3	US 59 (East End Boulevard) – Jefferson, Marshall	
Marshall			I-369	Proposed; I-369 exit 41
Marshall	8.4	13.5	SH 43 – Karnack, Marshall	Interchange
Marshall	9.7	15.6	FM 1998 (Scottsville Road) – Scottsville, Marshall	
Marshall	10.9	17.5	US 80 (Victory Drive) – Shreveport, Marshall	East terminus; planned interchange
			FM 31	Proposed
			I-20	Proposed; I-20 exit 618
			US 59	Proposed; Future east terminus
1.000 mi = 1.609 km; 1.000 km = 0.621 mi: Concurrency terminus

== See also ==
- List of state highway loops in Texas
