= Ken Jackson (baseball) =

American baseball player (born 1963)

- Shortstop
- Born: August 21, 1963 (age 62); Shreveport, Louisiana
- Batted: Right Threw: Right

MLB debut
- September 12, 1987, for the Philadelphia Phillies

Last MLB appearance
- October 3, 1987, for the Philadelphia Phillies

MLB statistics
- Batting average: .250
- Home runs: 0
- Runs batted in: 2
- Stats at Baseball Reference

Teams
- Philadelphia Phillies (1987)

Kenneth Bernard Jackson (born August 21, 1963) is a former Major League Baseball player. Jackson played for the Philadelphia Phillies in 1987.

Jackson attended Waskom High School in Waskom, Texas where, as a junior in 1980, he helped the school win a state championship. As a senior in 1981, he led Waskom to the state finals. Jackson was a pitcher in high school but, due to his small stature, was converted to infield at Angelina College. He signed a contract with the Phillies in 1982 and began his professional baseball career in Helena, Montana.
