= George E. Johnson (basketball) =

American basketball player

Personal information
- Born: June 19, 1947 (age 79) Harleton, Texas, U.S.
- Listed height: 6 ft 11 in (2.11 m)
- Listed weight: 245 lb (111 kg)

Career information
- High school: Harleton (Harleton, Texas)
- College: Stephen F. Austin (1966–1970)
- NBA draft: 1970: 1st round, 9th overall pick
- Drafted by: Baltimore Bullets
- Playing career: 1970–1976
- Position: Center
- Number: 31, 25, 16, 6

Career history
- 1970–1971: Baltimore Bullets
- 1971: Delaware Blue Bombers
- 1971–1972: Dallas Chaparrals
- 1973–1974: Houston Rockets
- 1975–1976: S.S. Lazio
- Stats at NBA.com
- Stats at Basketball Reference

George E. Johnson (born June 19, 1947) is an American former professional basketball player born in Harleton, Texas.

A 6'11" center from Stephen F. Austin State University, where he was a teammate of James Silas, who would later play most of his professional basketball career with the San Antonio Spurs. Johnson played in the National Basketball Association and American Basketball Association from 1970 to 1974. He was a member of the Baltimore Bullets, Dallas Chaparrals and Houston Rockets. In his NBA/ABA career, Johnson averaged 3.7 points per game and 5.0 rebounds per game.

== Career statistics ==
Legend
GP	Games played	GS	Games started	MPG	Minutes per game
FG%	Field goal percentage	3P%	3-point field goal percentage	FT%	Free throw percentage
RPG	Rebounds per game	APG	Assists per game	SPG	Steals per game
BPG	Blocks per game	PPG	Points per game	**Bold**	Career high

=== NBA/ABA ===
==== Regular season ====
Year	Team	GP	MPG	FG%	3P%	FT%	RPG	APG	SPG	BPG	PPG
1970–71	Baltimore (NBA)	24	14.0	.410		.367	4.8	.4			3.9
1971–72	Dallas (ABA)	**67**	**22.0**	.454	–	.592	**6.9**	**.9**			**4.7**
1972–73	Houston (NBA)	19	8.9	**.513**		**.750**	2.4	.2			2.3
1973–74	Houston (NBA)	26	9.2	.451		.471	2.3	.3	.3	.3	2.1
Career (NBA)		69	10.8	.442		.431	3.2	.3	.3	.3	2.8
Career (overall)		136	16.3	.449	–	.539	5.0	.6	.3	.3	3.7

==== Playoffs ====
Year	Team	GP	MPG	FG%	3P%	FT%	RPG	APG	PPG
1971	Baltimore (NBA)	**11**	3.2	**.538**		**.500**	1.0	.2	1.4
1972	Dallas (ABA)	4	**24.0**	.333	–	–	**6.0**	**2.3**	**1.5**
Career (overall)		15	8.7	.455	–	.500	2.3	.7	1.4
