= List of populated places in the United States with African-American plurality populations =

The following is a list of United States cities, towns, and unincorporated areas (Census Designated Places) in which a plurality of the population is African American or Black.

- Essex County, New Jersey
- Iberville Parish, Louisiana
- Philadelphia County, Pennsylvania
- Shelby County, Tennessee
- Beaumont, Texas
- Bowie, Maryland
- Bryn Mawr-Skyway, Washington
- Camden, New Jersey
- Chicago
- Cincinnati
- Danville, Virginia
- Ecorse, Michigan
- Englewood, New Jersey
- Fayetteville, North Carolina
- Glenn Heights, Texas
- Greenbelt, Maryland
- Griffin, Georgia
- Hempstead (village), New York
- Hillside, Illinois
- Hyattsville, Maryland
- Laurel, Maryland
- Marin City, California
- Milwaukee
- Norfolk, Virginia
- Philadelphia
- Saginaw, Michigan
- Scottsville, Texas
- St. Louis
- New York City
- Memphis
- Detroit
- Atlanta
- Miami
- Dallas
- Houston
