= Waskom High School =

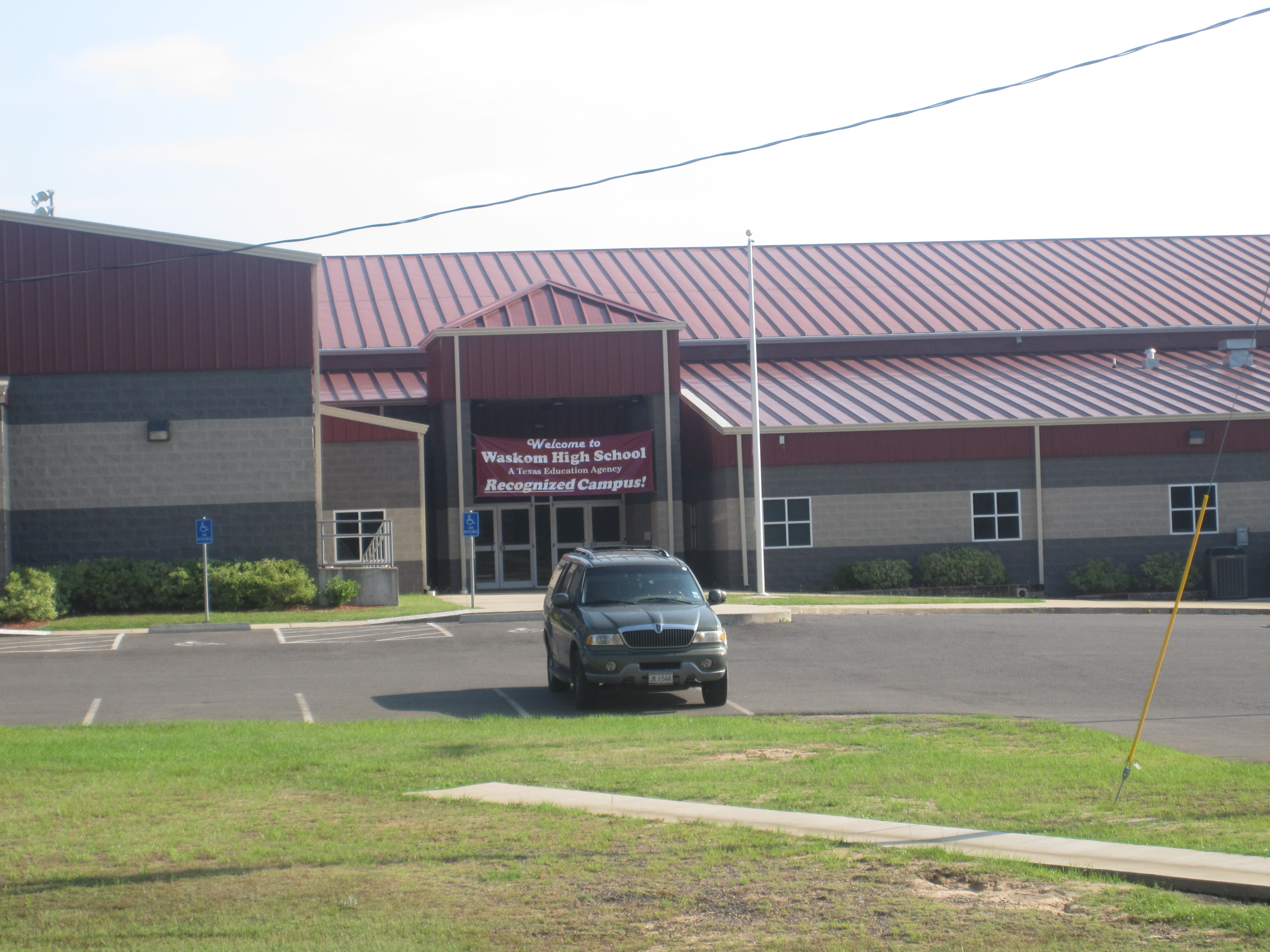

Location
- 980 School Avenue; Waskom, Texas 75692-0748; United States; 32.476055°N 94.071117°W

Information
- School type: Public high school
- School district: Waskom Independent School District
- Principal: Travis Danford
- Staff: 29.36 (on an FTE basis)
- Grades: 9–12
- Enrollment: 241 (2023–2024)
- Student to teacher ratio: 8.21
- Colors: Maroon & White
- Athletics conference: UIL Class AAA
- Mascot: Wildcat
- Website: Waskom High School website

Waskom High School is a public high school located in Waskom, Texas USA. It is located in eastern Harrison County on the Texas-Louisiana border and classified as a 3A school by the UIL. In 2015, the school was rated "Met Standard" by the Texas Education Agency.

== Notable alumni ==
- Kenneth Jackson, professional baseball player

== Athletics ==
The Waskom Wildcats compete in the following sports:

- Baseball
- Basketball
- Cross Country
- Football
- Powerlifting
- Soccer
- Softball
- Track and Field
- Volleyball

=== State titles ===
- Football
  - 2014 (3A/D2), 2015(3A/D2)

2014 Texas State 3A Division II Champions. Waskom beat Newton HS from Newton, TX 41-22 on Thursday December 18, 2014. This was Waskom's first State Championship appearance in football and their first championship. They were coached by Head Coach Whitney Keeling. RB Kevin Johnson was named the Offensive MVP with 106 yards rushing on 11 carries. RB Junebug Johnson added 92 yards and a touchdown on 8 carries. QB Trace Carter added 77 yards and a touchdown on 17 carries. Chan Aime, named the Defensive MVP, added 11 yards rushing with a touchdown. Aime also had 24 tackles, a forced fumble, and returned a kickoff 88 yards for a touchdown.

2015 Texas State 3A DIVISION II Champions. Waskom beat Franklin HS from Franklin, TX 33-21 on Thursday December 17, 2015. This was Waskom's second State Championship. They have a current win streak of 31 straight games. They won back to back in 14' and 15'. They were coached by Head Coach Whitney Keeling. The Wildcats are 45-2 since 2013. Chan Aime was named the Offensive MVP and had 29 rushes for 257 yards and 3 TDs. He also added one reception for 30 yards. QB Dylan Harkrider had 11 rushes for 73 yards and a TD, while going 6 of 11 passing for 86 yards and a TD. LB Mike Reason took home the Defensive MVP award. He had a team high 13 tackles and a fumble recovery.

- Baseball
  - 1980(1A)

==== State finalists ====
- Baseball
  - 1981(2A)

==== State semifinalist ====
- Football
  - 2013(2A/D2), 2014(3A/D2), 2015(3A/D2) 2020(3A/D2) 2021(3A/D20)

==== Regional Champions ====
- Football
  - 2013(2A/D2), 2014(3A/D2), 2015(3A/D2) 2020(3A/D2), 2021(3A/D2)
