= North East Texas Regional Mobility Authority =

Authority overview
- Formed: October 28, 2004
- Headquarters: 1011 Pruitt Place; Tyler, TX 75703
- Website: www.netrma.org

The North East Texas Regional Mobility Authority (NET RMA) is a Regional Mobility Authority covering several counties in the U.S. state of Texas. The NET RMA was created by the Texas Transportation Commission in 2004, originally containing the counties of Smith and Gregg. It was the 5th RMA established in the State of Texas, and is headquartered in Tyler. The authority claims to "provide solutions to expedite transportation and mobility projects that will improve the quality of life, enhance the regional economy and assure efficient mobility in the North East Texas Region."

== History ==
The NET RMA was established October 28, 2004 by a unanimous vote from the Texas Transportation Commission originally covering Smith and Gregg counties. In June 2006, the NET RMA became the first RMA in Texas to expand beyond its original county members, adding Cherokee, Harrison, Rusk, and Upshur counties, bringing the total number of member counties to six. In July 2007, the RMA expanded once again when the Texas Transportation Commission passed a resolution approving six additional counties—Bowie, Cass, Panola, Titus, Van Zandt and Wood. This brought the total membership to 12 counties. In November 2013, Kaufman County joined the RMA around the same time Cass County withdrew its membership, leaving the NET RMA at a 12 county membership.

== Board of directors ==
The NET RMA is led by a Board of Directors with at least one board member representing each member county. The Board is currently chaired by Gary Halbrooks. The board members are appointed by each county's Commissioners' Court. Board members serve staggered two year terms that expire on February 1 of each year. Board members can be reappointed.

== Projects ==
The NET RMA undertakes various projects to meet its goal of enhancing mobility and creating economic opportunity in the north East Texas Region. Projects the NET RMA may undertake include tolled or non-tolled roadway, passenger or freight rail, airport, intermodal hub, parking garages, pedestrian or bicycle facilities, border crossing station (except in Laredo, TX), automated conveyor belt for movement of freight, air quality improvement initiative, public utility facility, and projects listed in the State Implementation Plan.

=== Roadways ===
The flagship project of the NET RMA is Loop 49, a halfway completed tollway designed to improve connections and relieve congestion in the cities of Tyler, Longview, and Marshall. Loop 49 is being built in several phases, including:

- Toll 49 in Tyler, from I-20 west of Lindale to SH 110 southeast of Tyler
- The Lindale Relief Route, from I-20 West of Lindale to US 69 north of Lindale
- The East Texas Hourglass, a connection between the Tyler and Longview, going to the west and north of Longview and, connecting to US 59 north of Marshall

The first segment of Loop 49, which stretches from US 69 to SH 155, opened in August 2006. The second segment of Toll 49, from US 69 to FM 756 (Paluxy Road) opened in January 2008.
