= Avaton, Texas =

Ghost town in Texas, US

Avaton is a ghost town in Harrison County, Texas, United States. From 1884 to 1902, a post office operated in the community. It failed to grow further, and the town was reclaimed by nature by the 1940s.
