= Hogg Middle School =

Hogg Middle School or Hogg Junior High School refers to:

- James S. Hogg Middle School - Houston, Texas - Houston Independent School District
- James S. Hogg Middle School - Tyler, Texas - Tyler Independent School District
