= Latex (disambiguation) =

Latex is an aqueous dispersion of polymers that can be solidified into rubber.

Latex may also refer to:

== Materials ==
- Natural rubber, the commercial product made from plants that naturally produce polyisoprene latex
- Latex clothing, made from latex rubber
- Synthetic latex or synthetic rubber

== Other uses ==
- LaTeX, a document preparation system and markup language
- Latex, Texas, US
