= Keyuo Craver =

American football player (born 1980)

No. 29, 43
- Position: Cornerback

Personal information
- Born: August 22, 1980 (age 46); Dallas, Texas, U.S.
- Listed height: 5 ft 10 in (1.78 m)
- Listed weight: 195 lb (88 kg)

Career information
- High school: Harleton (Harleton, Texas)
- College: Nebraska
- NFL draft: 2002: 4th round, 125th overall pick

Career history
- 2002–2004: New Orleans Saints
- 2005–2006: Edmonton Eskimos
- 2006–2008: Arizona Rattlers
- 2009–2010: Winnipeg Blue Bombers

Awards and highlights
- Grey Cup champion (2005); First-team All-American (2001); First-team All-Big 12 (2001)

Career NFL statistics
- Tackles: 60
- Knockdowns: 3
- Interceptions: 3 (Longest: 43 yds)
- Kickoff Returns: 7 (Avg: 20.1 yds; Longest: 23 yds)
- Stats at Pro Football Reference

Keyuo Boderek Craver (born August 22, 1980) is an American former professional football cornerback in the National Football League (NFL) and Canadian Football League (CFL). He played college football for the Nebraska Cornhuskers. In January 2015, he joined the Omaha Beef of Champions Indoor Football (CIF) as an assistant coach.

== Playing career ==
He played high school football at Harleton High School in Harleton, Texas. He also won state in the triple jump. While he wanted to play football for Texas A&M, he received a full scholarship from college football the University of Nebraska–Lincoln and was selected in the fourth round (125th overall) of the 2002 NFL draft by the New Orleans Saints.

Craver spent three seasons with the Saints where he started 22 total games. He recorded 22 tackles and three assists while with the team. A highlight of Craver's time with the Saints came in 2002 when he scooped up a fumble and raced in for a touchdown against the Packers. Craver played two seasons with the Edmonton Eskimos of the CFL.

In 2010, the Winnipeg Blue Bombers decided to move Craver to the inside halfback position. This move came at the expense of shutdown corner Lenny Walls.

=== College statistics ===
Year	School	G	GS	Tackles					Interceptions			
Year	School	G	GS	Solo	Ast	Tot	Sacks	Sacks-Yards	Int	PD	FF	FR
1998	Nebraska	12	0	13	14	27	0	0	1	3	0	0
1999	Nebraska	13	13	35	18	53	0	0	3	14	0	1
2000	Nebraska	12	12	38	24	62	2.5	2.5-16	0	16	0	0
2001	Nebraska	13	13	39	29	68	0	0	4	13	1	0
