= Maverick Field =

Baseball arena

Coordinates: 32.53301°N 94.35416°W

Maverick Field is a baseball venue in Marshall, Texas and the home of the Marshall Mavericks baseball team. It is a stadium, arena and sports venue. The facility opened in 1980. There is a scoreboard in left field, high trees in center field that provide a hitters' background, and other amenities. The ballpark has a capacity of 1,000.
