= Texas State Highway 182 =

State highway in Texas

State Highway 182
- SH 182, highlighted in red

Route information
- Maintained by TxDOT
- Length: 10.505 mi (16.906 km)
- Existed: by 1933–present

Major junctions
- West end: US 69 in Alba
- East end: SH 154 in Quitman

Location
- Country: United States
- State: Texas

Highway system
- Highways in Texas; Interstate; US; State; Former; Toll; Loops; Spurs; FM/RM; Park; Rec
← SH 181	→ US 183

State Highway 182 (SH 182) is a state highway between Alba and Quitman in the U.S. state of Texas.

== Route description ==
SH 182's western terminus is at U.S. Highway 69 in Alba. The highway travels east through Wood County along the southern shoreline of the Lake Fork Reservoir. The highway's eastern terminus is at its intersection with SH 154 west of Quitman. However, signage in Quitman at the intersection of Main Street (SH 37, SH 154, and Loop 173) and Bermuda Street directs motorists to SH 182 via SH 154 (West Bermuda Street).

== History ==
SH 182 was designated on November 30, 1932, along its current route. The route was part of SH 42 before March 19, 1930, but was erroneously omitted from the highway log issued on that date.

== Junction list ==
The entire highway is in Wood County.

Location	mi	km	Destinations	Notes
Alba	0.0	0.0	US 69 – Mineola, Greenville	
Alba	0.5	0.80	FM 17 (Osborn Street) – Lake Fork Reservoir	
	7.4	11.9	FM 288 north to SH 154	Southern terminus of FM 288
	10.4	16.7	SH 154 west / CR 1308 – Sulphur Springs	Western end of SH 154 concurrency
Quitman	11.9	19.2	SH 37 / SH 154 east / Loop 173 east (Main Street) / Bermuda Street – Winnsboro, Gilmer, Mineola	Eastern end of SH 154 concurrency; western terminus of Loop 173
1.000 mi = 1.609 km; 1.000 km = 0.621 mi: Concurrency terminus
