= Tyler Legacy High School =

Location
- 411 E Southeast Loop 323; Tyler, Texas 75701-9699; United States; 32.30115°N 95.29688°W

Information
- Former name: Robert E. Lee High School (1958–2020)
- Type: Public School
- Motto: The sun that sets may never rise but Raider spirit never dies!
- Established: 1958
- School district: Tyler Independent School District
- NCES District ID: 4843470
- NCES School ID: 484347004941
- Principal: Geoffrey Sherman
- Teaching staff: 181.51 (FTE)
- Grades: 9–12
- Enrollment: 2,648 (2023-2024)
- Student to teacher ratio: 14.29
- Campus type: Urban
- Colors: Red and White
- Athletics conference: UIL Class 6A
- Nickname: Red Raiders
- Newspaper: Southern Accent
- Website: www.tylerisd.org/o/legacy

Tyler Legacy High School, is one of four Tyler Independent School District high school campuses in the city of Tyler, Texas, the others being Tyler High School, Early College High School, and RISE Academy. The school has served the East Texas community since 1958 and was renamed Tyler Legacy High School in 2020. It is classified as a 6A school by the UIL. In 2013, the school was rated "Met Standard" by the Texas Education Agency.

== History ==
In the 1960s, when Lee's mascot was the Rebel, the school was famous for its working cannon and oversized Confederate flag. A group of seniors called the Rebel Guard tended the replica cannon at games, firing it when the Rebel football team scored a touchdown. The cannon, retired in 1986, is now the property of Brook Hill School in Bullard, Texas.

The football team entered Rose Stadium by running under the flag, reputed to be the second largest Confederate flag in the world (second only to one owned by the University of Mississippi). In January 1972, spurred by a petition from four Black students, the school board voted to get rid of the flag, the fight song ("Dixie"), and other symbols of the Confederacy.

=== Name change ===
Robert E. Lee High School was given its name upon opening in 1958 as an all-white school. After unsuccessful efforts to rename the school at the time of its racial integration in 1970 and various times after, there was a debate in the Tyler community in 2017–2018 on whether the school's name should change. In 2018, the district's board decided not to vote on a possible renaming, so the school kept its name. In June 2020, Trude Lamb, a Ghanaian-born student and top athlete in running, made national news when she refused to wear the jersey for her school Robert E. Lee High School unless the name is changed. On July 16, 2020, the school board voted unanimously to initiate changing the name of both Robert E. Lee High School and John Tyler High School.

== Demographics ==
As of the 2023–24 school year, the student body consisted of:

- 37.0% White (Non-Hispanic)
- 29.4% Hispanic
- 25.4% African American
- 3.2% Asian
- 0.3% Native American
- 0.1% Pacific Islander
- 4.5% Two or More Races

== Education ==
Tyler Legacy High School offers a variety of pre-AP, AP-level courses, Tyler Junior College Dual-Credit courses, as well as career technology education programs and fine arts electives. The school implemented an international baccalaureate program in the fall of 2008. The IB program has been canceled.

== Athletics ==
As of 2024, Tyler Legacy High School is classified as a 6A school in District 10 along with many East Dallas schools such as Rockwall and Forney. Tyler Legacy Red Raiders compete in a variety of sports including baseball, basketball, golf, soccer, softball, volleyball, tennis, powerlifting, track, swimming, cross country and is most well known for the Tyler football team.

=== State titles ===
- Football
  - 2004(5A/D1) - Defeated Spring Westfield 28–21 at the Alamodome in San Antonio, Texas
- Boys Golf
  - 1959(3A)
- Team Tennis
  - 1987(5A), 1988(5A)

== Notable alumni ==
- Steve Breedlove, Anglican bishop
- Sandy Duncan, Class of 1965, actress
- Holland Lee Hendrix, Class of 1966, biblical scholar and late president of Union Theological Seminary (New York City)
- Alex Finlayson, Class of 1969, playwright and journalist
- Dale Dudley, Class of 1979, radio personality (Dudley and Bob) at KLBJ-FM Austin, Texas, Film Actor, Magazine Columnist.
- Corey Mayfield, Class of 1988, 3yr Starter at Oklahoma, San Fran 49r's, Tampa Bay Buccaneers and Jacksonville Jaguars.
- Fred Coleman, wide receiver for the New England Patriots
- Joffrey Reynolds, Class of 1997, running back for the Calgary Stampeders
- Matt Flynn, Class of 2003, quarterback for the Green Bay Packers
- Brandon Pettigrew, Class of 2004, tight end for the Detroit Lions
- Ciron Black, Class of 2005, former tackle for the Louisiana State University Tigers
- Beaux Limmer, Class of 2019, center for the Los Angeles Rams
- Burch Smith, Major League Baseball player for the San Francisco Giants
