= Waskom Independent School District =

School district in Texas

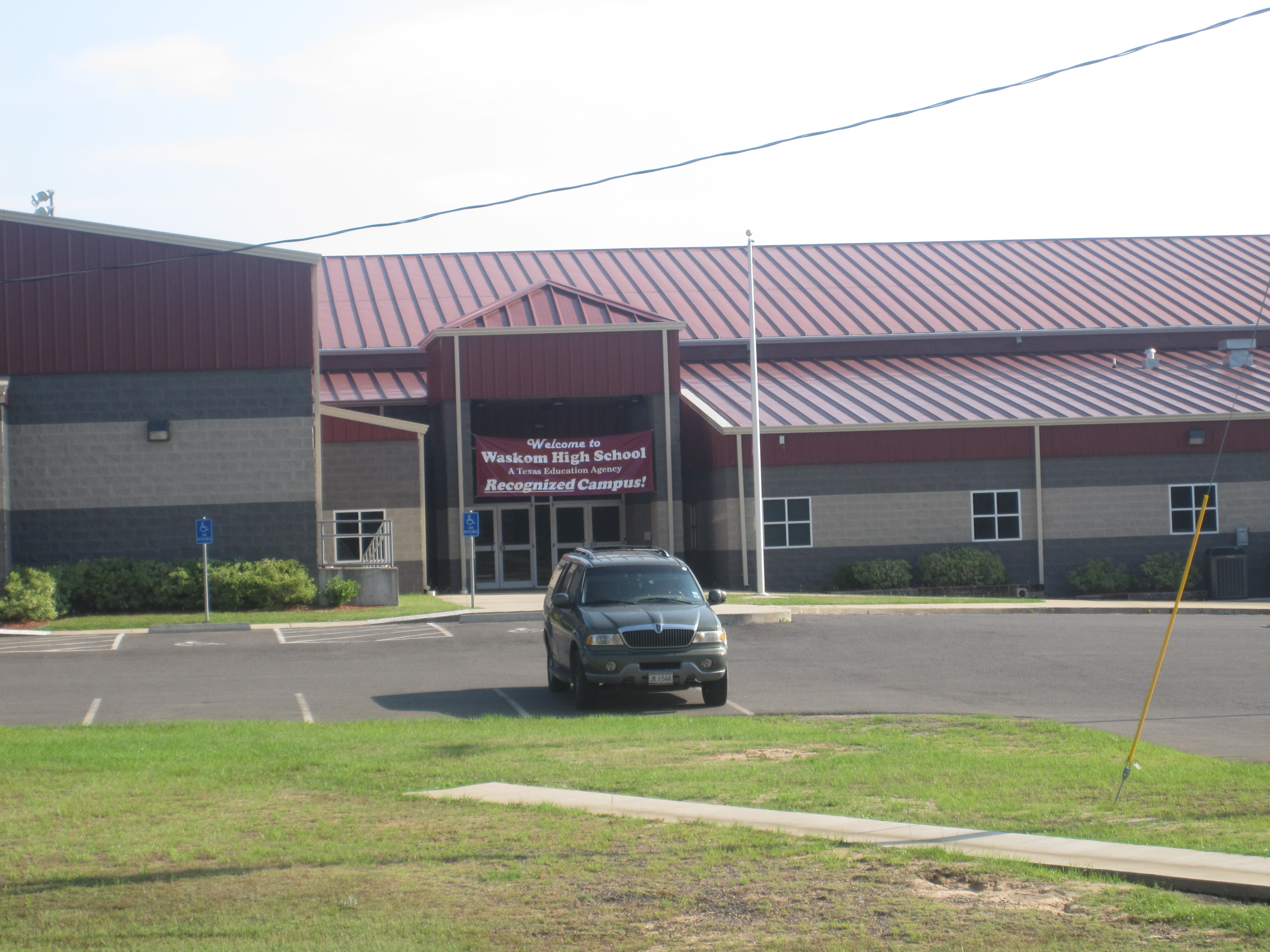
Waskon High School as photographed from Interstate 20 in Harrison County, Texas

Waskom Independent School District is a public school district based in Waskom, Texas (USA).

In 2009, the school district was rated "academically acceptable" by the Texas Education Agency.

== Schools ==
- Waskom High (Grades 9-12)
- Waskom Middle (Grades 6-8)
- Waskom Elementary (Grades PK-5)
