= Texas State Highway 154 =

Highway in Texas

State Highway 154
- SH 154 highlighted in red

Route information
- Maintained by TxDOT
- Length: 104.59 mi (Note: The certified mileage given is shorter than the actual mileage as TxDOT considers SH 154 to be discontinuous at rather than concurrent with SH 19 and SH 37.) (168.32 km)
- Existed: by 1931–present

Major junctions
- West end: Bus. SH 24 / FM 1528 in Cooper
- I-30 / US 67 in Sulphur Springs; US 271 / SH 155 in Gilmer; US 259 in Diana
- East end: Loop 390 in Marshall

Location
- Country: United States
- State: Texas

Highway system
- Highways in Texas; Interstate; US; State; Former; Toll; Loops; Spurs; FM/RM; Park; Rec
← SH 153	→ SH 155

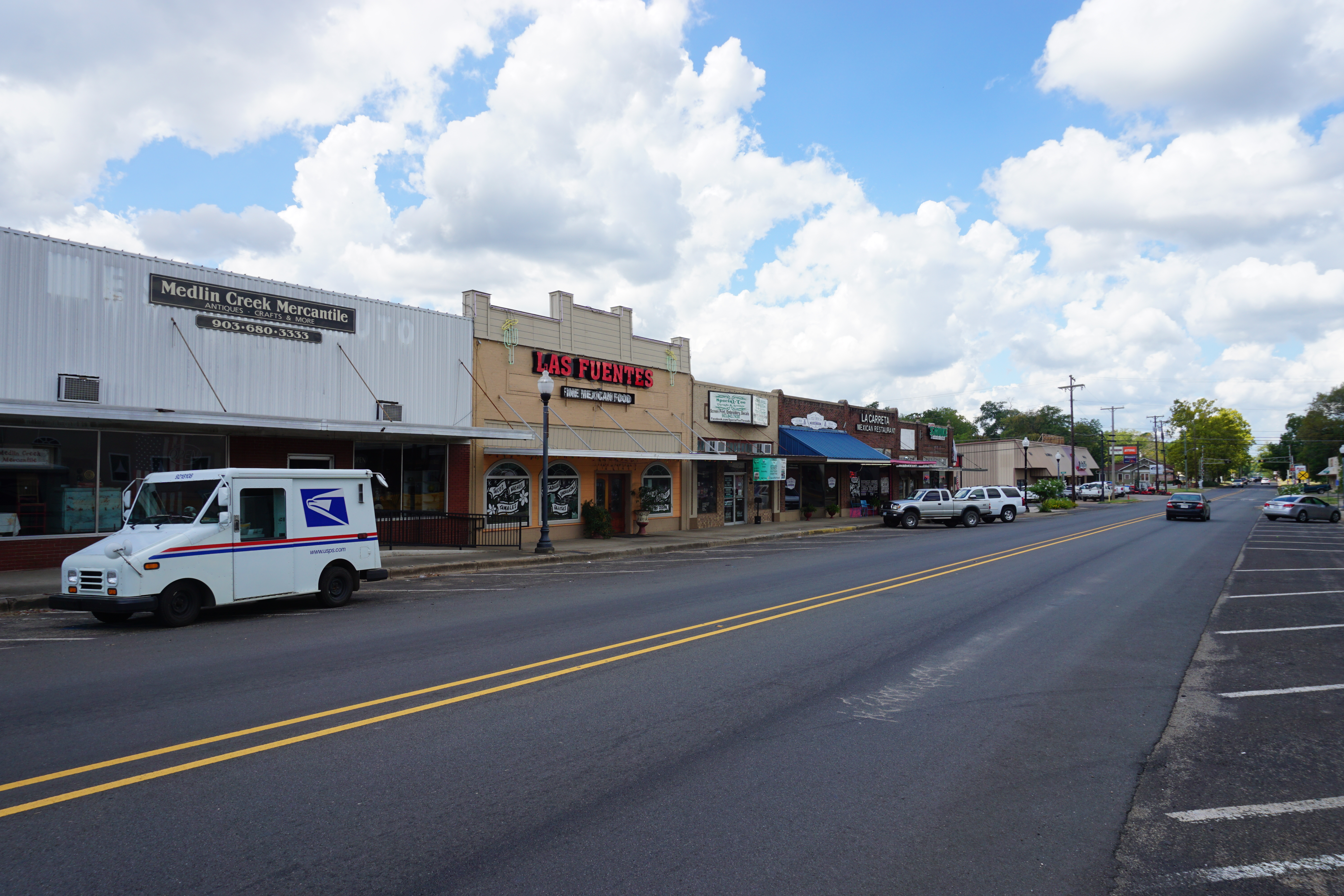
SH 154 as Tyler Street in Gilmer

State Highway 154 (SH 154) is a state highway that runs from Cooper to Marshall in northeast Texas.

== Route description ==
SH 154 begins at an intersection with Bus. SH 24/FM 1528 in downtown Cooper. The highway travels east through town along Dallas Avenue before leaving the Cooper city limits near Harmon Park. SH 154 travels through rural areas near the northern shore of Cooper Lake before intersecting SH 19 approximately 5.0 miles (8.0 km) east of Cooper, beginning an overlap with that highway. The two highways travel south together to the northern edge of Sulphur Springs, with SH 19 leaving at an intersection with Loop 301. In Sulphur Springs, SH 154 is known as Church Street from SH 19/Loop 301 to Bus. US 67 at the town square, then becomes Gilmer Street at Bus. US 67, before becoming Broadway Street at Mockingbird Lane. In southern Sulphur Springs, the highway intersects I-30/US 67 and SH 11 before leaving the town.

Leaving Sulphur Springs, SH 154 travels in a south-southwest direction between the eastern and western arms of Lake Fork Reservoir, crossing over the reservoir near the Holiday Villages subdivision. The highway starts to run in a more eastern direction at an intersection with SH 182, with SH 154 and SH 182 running concurrently with one another until SH 37 in Quitman, which also serves as the eastern terminus for SH 182. SH 154 overlaps with SH 37 through the Quitman town square with the overlap ending near UT Health: Quitman. Leaving Quitman, the highway travels through sparsely populated and forested areas, intersecting US 271/SH 155 in Gilmer and US 259 in Diana. SH 154 shares a brief overlap with FM 450 through the unincorporated community of Harleton, then turns back in a southeast direction as it leaves the town. The highway then travels through Nesbitt before ending at an intersection with Loop 390 (Ernest Smith Parkway) just inside the Marshall city limits, with the road continuing past Loop 390 as Van Zandt Street towards East Texas Baptist University.

== History ==
The route was designated originally on March 19, 1930 between Cooper and Quitman as a renumbering of SH 37A. A proposed extension west to Ladonia was added on February 8, 1933. On July 15, 1935, the extension was cancelled. On December 22, 1936, the extension of SH 154 to Ladonia was restored. On August 4, 1937, this section to Cooper was renumbered as new SH 247, and SH 154 was rerouted north over old SH 247 to northeast of Cooper. On November 16, 1937, SH 154 was extended to Gilmer. On September 26, 1939, it was extended southeast from Gilmer to Marshall along its current route. This extension replaced part of SH 155. On August 24, 1960, the section north of Sulphur Springs was transferred to SH 19. On August 28, 1961, SH 154 was extended north and west to Cooper, replacing part of FM 64. On January 31, 1969, SH 154 was extended southeast from US 80 to SH 43, concurrent with SH 43 to US 59, east to FM 31 and southeast concurrent with FM 31 to I-20. On November 16, 1987, SH 154 was rerouted through Sulphur Springs. On January 28, 2005, the section of SH 154 from US 59 to FM 31 was cancelled as it was never built, and the concurrent portions were removed, with the section of SH 154 south of Loop 390 to SH 43 becoming part of Loop 390.

== Junction list ==
County	Location	mi	km	Destinations	Notes
Delta	Cooper	0.0	0.0	Bus. SH 24 / FM 1528 west	
Delta		1.4	2.3	FM 1529 – Cooper State Park	
Delta–Hopkins county line		4.8	7.7	SH 19 north – Paris	West end of SH 19 overlap
Hopkins	Tira	8.0	12.9	FM 1536 east – Tira	
Hopkins		11.6	18.7	FM 71 – Sulphur Bluff, Commerce	
Hopkins		16.9	27.2	FM 1537 east	
Hopkins	Sulphur Springs	18.3	29.5	SH 19 south to I-30 west – Emory Loop 301 south to I-30 east	East end of SH 19 overlap
Hopkins	Sulphur Springs	19.7	31.7	FM 2285 north (Airport Road)	Access to Sulphur Springs Municipal Airport
Hopkins	Sulphur Springs	21.0	33.8	Bus. US 67 north (Jefferson Street)	West end of Bus. US 67 overlap
Hopkins	Sulphur Springs	21.1	34.0	Bus. US 67 south (Main Street)	East end of Bus. 67 overlap
Hopkins	Sulphur Springs	22.5	36.2	I-30 (US 67) – Texarkana, Dallas, Greenville	I-30 exit 124
Hopkins	Sulphur Springs	23.1	37.2	SH 11 – Winnsboro, Commerce	
Hopkins		30.9	49.7	FM 1567 east	West end of FM 1567 overlap
Hopkins	Seymore	31.4	50.5	FM 1567 west – Arbala	East end of FM 1567 overlap
Wood	Yantis	35.8	57.6	FM 17 south / FM 514 south / FM 2966 south – Alba	
Wood		38.3	61.6	FM 515 – Emory, Winnsboro	
Wood		42.8	68.9	FM 288 west	
Wood		46.5	74.8	SH 182 west – Alba	West end of SH 182 overlap
Wood	Quitman	48.0	77.2	SH 37 south / SH 182 ends – Mineola	East end of SH 182 overlap; west end of SH 37 overlap
Wood	Quitman	48.1	77.4	Loop 173 east / FM 2966 north – Lake Quitman	
Wood	Quitman	48.4	77.9	SH 37 north – Winnsboro	East end of SH 37 overlap
Wood		54.5	87.7	FM 14 – Winnsboro, Hawkins	
Wood		59.5	95.8	FM 312 – Winnsboro	
Wood		63.8	102.7	FM 2869 – Winnsboro, Holly Lake Ranch	
Upshur	Rhonesboro	66.6	107.2	FM 1002 – Shady Grove	
Upshur		76.7	123.4	FM 852 west	
Upshur	Gilmer	77.2	124.2	FM 49 west – Latch	
Upshur	Gilmer	78.4	126.2	US 271 / SH 155 (Wood Street)	
Upshur		80.4	129.4	FM 555 north	
Upshur		82.6	132.9	FM 1650 east	
Upshur		86.1	138.6	FM 726 south	West end of FM 726 overlap
Upshur		87.0	140.0	FM 726 north – Lake O' the Pines	East end of FM 726 overlap
Upshur	Diana	90.0	144.8	US 259	
Upshur		92.2	148.4	FM 3245 west	
Upshur		95.8	154.2	FM 2879 south	
Harrison	Harleton	101.1	162.7	FM 450 north	West end of FM 450 overlap
Harrison	Harleton	101.4	163.2	FM 450 south	East end of FM 450 overlap
Harrison		102.8	165.4	FM 2208	
Harrison	Marshall	115.3	185.6	Loop 390 (Ernest Smith Parkway) to US 59 north – Marshall	
1.000 mi = 1.609 km; 1.000 km = 0.621 mi: Concurrency terminus
