= Nesbitt, Texas =

- Unincorporated community
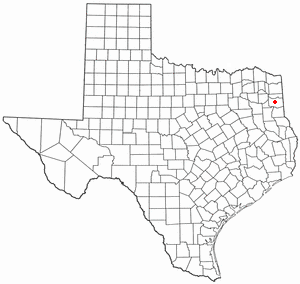
- Location of Nesbitt, Texas

- Coordinates: 32°35′54″N 94°27′33″W
- Country: United States
- State: Texas
- County: Harrison

Area
  - Total: 1.7 sq mi (4.5 km^{2})
  - Land: 1.7 sq mi (4.5 km^{2})
  - Water: 0 sq mi (0.0 km^{2})
- Elevation: 335 ft (102 m)

Population (2010)
  - Total: 281
  - Density: 161/sq mi (62.1/km^{2})
- Time zone: UTC-6 (Central (CST))
  - Summer (DST): UTC-5 (CDT)
- ZIP code: 75670
- Area codes: 903, 430
- FIPS code: 48-50724
- GNIS feature ID: 2413039

Nesbitt is an unincorporated community in Harrison County, Texas, United States. Nesbitt's town government was disestablished on January 1, 2000, but it was still listed as a town at the 2010 census, with a population of 281.

== Geography ==
Nesbitt is located in central Harrison County 7 miles (11 km) northwest of Marshall, the county seat, along Texas State Highway 154.

According to the United States Census Bureau, the town had a total area of 1.7 square miles (4.5 km^{2}), all land.

== Demographics ==
As of the census of 2000, there were 302 people, 115 households, and 83 families residing in the town. The population density was 172.8 inhabitants per square mile (66.7/km^{2}). There were 131 housing units at an average density of 75.0 per square mile (29.0/km^{2}). The racial makeup of the town was 80.46% White, 18.21% African American, 0.99% Native American, and 0.33% from two or more races.

There were 115 households, out of which 31.3% had children under the age of 18 living with them, 59.1% were married couples living together, 9.6% had a female householder with no husband present, and 27.8% were non-families. 27.0% of all households were made up of individuals, and 13.0% had someone living alone who was 65 years of age or older. The average household size was 2.63 and the average family size was 3.20.

In the town the population was spread out, with 27.2% under the age of 18, 9.3% from 18 to 24, 25.5% from 25 to 44, 23.5% from 45 to 64, and 14.6% who were 65 years of age or older. The median age was 38 years. For every 100 females, there were 102.7 males. For every 100 females age 18 and over, there were 100.0 males.

The median income for a household in the town was $29,583, and the median income for a family was $50,833. Males had a median income of $43,750 versus $23,000 for females. The per capita income for the town was $16,632. About 6.3% of families and 10.0% of the population were below the poverty line, including 14.9% of those under the age of eighteen and 10.0% of those 65 or over.

== Fire Service ==
Nesbitt is served by Hasrrison County ESD#2 Nesbitt Fire Department. Nesbitt is an all volunteer department and has three station locations.

== Education ==
Nesbitt is served by the Marshall Independent School District. The zoned elementary school is P.T. Young Elementary School, and the secondary schools are Marshall Junior High School and Marshall High School. Previously students in grades PK–4 were zoned to Moore Elementary School, and students in grades 5–6 were zoned to Sam Houston Middle School.

Panola College is the assigned community college for the majority of Harrison County, Nesbitt included, according to the Texas Education Code.
