= Early College High School (Tyler, Texas) =

Public magnet high school in Tyler, Texas, United States

Tyler ISD Early College High School

Location
- 3011 Earl Campbell Pkwy; Tyler, Texas; United States; 32.32959°N 95.33506°W

Information
- School type: Public early college magnet school
- Motto: Not Dual Credit, Dual Completion
- Established: 2015
- School district: Tyler Independent School District
- Principal: Amanda Hortman
- Faculty: 21.50 (FTE)
- Grades: 9–12
- Enrollment: 465 (2025–2026)
- Student to teacher ratio: 20.79
- Mascot: Owl
- Website: www.tylerisd.org/o/echs/

Tyler ISD Early College High School (ECHS) is a public early college high school and magnet school located in Tyler, Texas, United States. Part of the Tyler Independent School District (Tyler ISD), the school operates in partnership with Tyler Junior College (TJC) to allow students in grades 9–12 to simultaneously earn a high school diploma and up to 60 college credit hours—or an associate degree—tuition-free.

== History ==
In April 2015, the Texas Education Agency (TEA) designated Tyler Independent School District as one of 44 newly approved Early College High School programs in Texas for the 2015–2016 academic year. The school opened in fall 2015 under founding principal DelSenna Frazier with an inaugural class of 116 ninth-grade students selected through a competitive application process.

Following Frazier's retirement at the end of the 2020–2021 school year, Amanda Hortman was appointed principal in February 2021.

== Campus ==
From its founding in 2015 through spring 2024, ECHS was housed in a repurposed campus on West Shaw Street. Using funding from an $89 million bond package approved by Tyler ISD voters in May 2022, the district built a new facility at 3011 Earl Campbell Parkway, adjacent to Tyler ISD's Career and Technology Center. Designed by architecture firm Corgan, the campus held a ribbon-cutting ceremony in May 2024 and opened to students for the 2024–2025 academic year.

== Academics and program structure ==
Tyler ISD Early College High School operates under an open-enrollment magnet model open to incoming ninth-grade students (and select tenth-grade applicants) residing in Tyler ISD or surrounding districts that lack an early college program. In accordance with Texas Early College High School guidelines, admissions prioritize first-generation college students as well as applicants from low-income or underrepresented backgrounds.

The academic program follows a phased four-year structure integrating high school and college coursework:

- Grades 9–10: Students complete foundational high school coursework taught exclusively at the Pre-AP or Advanced Placement (AP) level on the ECHS campus while beginning introductory dual credit classes.
- Grades 11–12: Upperclassmen transition to taking the majority of their courses directly on the Tyler Junior College main campus alongside traditional college students, with district-provided shuttle transportation, free college textbooks, and academic advising.

Unlike traditional comprehensive high schools in Tyler ISD, ECHS focuses exclusively on academics and does not field University Interscholastic League (UIL) varsity athletics programs.

== Demographics ==
According to data reported by the Texas Education Agency and The Texas Tribune, enrollment for the 2025–2026 school year was 465 students. The student body was 58.3% Hispanic, and 68.6% of students were classified as economically disadvantaged.

== Recognition and awards ==
- Lone Star Ribbon School (2025): In September 2025, Tyler ISD Early College High School was named among the 26 inaugural Texas public schools honored as a Lone Star Ribbon School by the Texas Education Agency and Governor Greg Abbott, a state-level recognition established to succeed the federal National Blue Ribbon Schools Program.
- CCRSM Designated with Distinction (2026): In August 2026, the Texas Education Agency recognized ECHS as a "Designated with Distinction" campus under its College and Career Readiness School Models (CCRSM) program.
- Regional Rankings: ECHS was ranked as the top public high school in East Texas by U.S. News & World Report for the 2025–2026 school year.

== See also ==
- Tyler High School
- Tyler Legacy High School
- List of high schools in Texas
