= Marshall High School (Texas) =

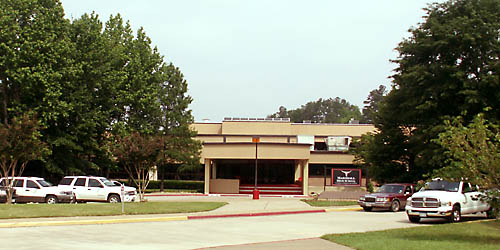

Location
- 1900 Maverick Dr; Marshall, Texas 75670-0949; United States; 32.5304°N 94.3537°W

Information
- School type: Public high school
- Motto: “Excellence in Academics and Athletics”
- School district: Marshall Independent School District
- Principal: Matthew Gregory
- Staff: 92.03 (FTE)
- Grades: 9-12
- Enrollment: 1,411 (2023-2024)
- Student to teacher ratio: 15.33
- Colors: Red & White
- Athletics conference: UIL Class AAAAA
- Mascot: Maverick
- Website: Marshall High School website

Marshall High School (MHS) is a 5A public school in Marshall, Texas, United States. It is part of the Marshall Independent School District which serves students in central Harrison County. In 2014, the school was rated "Academically Acceptable" by the Texas Education Agency.

In addition to Marshall, it also serves the surrounding communities of Nesbitt and Scottsville.

== History ==
On September 12, 1898, Marshall High School began operation in a building leased from College of Marshall.

The first Marshall High School had only two teachers, who instructed 30 students in five subjects: Latin, English, history, math, and science. Only grades 8–10 were taught when the school opened, but by 1902 had expanded through the 12th grade. The first graduate of MHS was Miss Verbena Barnes. In 1900 there were three graduates.

On September 25, 1905, the newly constructed East Side Building was opened for grades 1-12. However, due to the rapid growth of both the elementary classes as well as the high school, overcrowding became an issue almost immediately. MHS was relocated in 1907 to the old Masonic Female Institute campus to alleviate the crowded facility, but also to provide much needed science lab space for the students.

On March 29, 1910, the College of Marshall transferred a large building and parcel of property to the Marshall School Board. The property was located at 600 West Houston street, just blocks from the heart of downtown Marshal. This facility would be used until a new permanent high school could be completed. In September 1911, 200 high school students enrolled at MHS.

In 1923 the old College of Marshall building was demolished and a new building was opened for grades 9–12. MHS (the sports teams then known as the Mustangs) remained in that building until 1939. In 1940 Marshall opened a massive three story brick and sandstone building that would become the home of "The Mavericks" for the next 41 years.

In 1954 a new wing was added to the west side of facility that would become home to administrative offices, fine arts classrooms and the Industrial Arts Department. A new 1,300 seat gym was opened in 1965.

The 1960s brought about more change as the Marshall Independent School District (MISD) saw the integration of Marshall High School with the segregated Pemberton High School. In 1967, the first African American students to integrate were Robert Campbell, who wanted to take advantage of Marshall High's art program, and Herbert Chambers. The increase in enrollment for the combined schools led to the passage of a bond issue in 1976 for the construction of a new facility. The new building became home to grades 10–12, while MHS 9th graders attended the Pemberton site.

In September 1980, students stepped into a comprehensive 212,000-square-foot facility on Maverick Drive. The school had an initial capacity of 1,600 students. Its features included a 2,000-seat gym with three courts, 600-seat auditorium, and a multi-tiered dining area. A separation of academic areas from industrial, co-op, and Fine Arts added to the layout. The new complex also included a new 7,000-seat stadium with all-weather track, a 12,000 square-foot field house, six tennis courts and a baseball field.

A facilities study, followed by a bond issue in 1986, led to the closing of the Pemberton High site, and the opening of a ninth-grade wing at Marshall High School. The addition reunited grades 9–12 and expanded the capacity of MHS to 2.000. The 44,420-square-foot addition opened to students on September 1, 1988.

A supplemental field house for baseball, cross-country, soccer, and tennis opened at the north end of Maverick Drive in December, 1988.

In 1993 came a 2,000-seat addition to Maverick Stadium, expanded the capacity to 9,000. A major expansion for the MHS band program came in the mid 1990s with a 2nd rehearsal hall, more practice space, a loading dock, and expanded storage. In the late 1990s MISD constructed what is widely considered one of the finest softball facilities in the state for the Lady Mavs.

All-weather turf was installed in Maverick Stadium in the summer of 2003 along with a new sound system and a digital scoreboard. In the spring of 2005 a state of the art weight and training center known as the Maverick Athletic Complex was opened for all MHS athletes thanks to the help of community donations and support from donors.

== Student demographics ==
As of the 2012–13 school year, Marshall High had a total of 1,534 students (46.6% White, 39.7% African American, 12.9% Hispanic, 0.7% Asian/Pacific Islander, and 0.1% Native American). 44.4% of the students are considered economically disadvantaged.

== Athletics ==
Student athletes are known as Mavericks and Lady Mavs. MHS competes the following sports: cross country, volleyball, football, basketball, powerlifting, swimming, soccer, golf, tennis, track, baseball, and softball. The Maverick football team has been playing for over 100 seasons, dating prior to 1900. They have been the longest running and most successful team for MHS.

=== Football history ===
The Mavericks have made it to the post-season playoffs 36 times since 1908 (114 years), winning the 5A Division I State Championship in 1990. Additional accomplishments are:

- State Finalists: 2004 (4A), 2005 (4A)
- State Semi-Finalists: 1926, 1928, 1989
- State Quarter Finalists: 1924, 1925, 1927, 1945, 1949, 1988, 1994, 2007, 2009, 2015
- Area Champions: 1993, 2014, 2018
- Bi-District Champions: 1929, 1995, 1996
- District Champions: 1908, 1920, 1943, 1944, 1951, 1952 (shared), 1962 (shared), 1966, 2017, 2019
- Additional Playoff Appearances: 1984, 2010, 2013, 2016

Other notable athletic achievements include the Maverick baseball team advancing to the state tournament and regionals, regional tournament appearances by the basketball and soccer teams, individual state championships in track and field, and several appearances at the state powerlifting championships. The most successful Lady Mav team has been the softball team, who advanced to the post season 17 times in the 19 years between beginning play in 1995 and 2013.

== Notable alumni ==
- Robert Campbell (artist), a painter, poet, and publisher
- James Farmer, Pemberton High School
- Brea Grant, actor and writer
- Sam B. Hall, Judge of the United States District Court
- Elise Harmon (1909–1985), chemist and physicist
- Susan Howard, Actress
- Lady Bird Johnson, Wife of Lyndon B. Johnson and First lady
- Bill Moyers, former White house Press Secretary.
- Keith Sanderson (born 1975), sport shooter
- Terrance Shaw, former NFL cornerback
- Y. A. Tittle, former NFL quarterback
- George Foreman, professional boxer
- Tahj Washington, NFL wide receiver for the Miami Dolphins
- Savion Williams, NFL wide receiver for the Green Bay Packers
- Odell Beckham Sr. Father of NFL Receiver Odell Beckham Jr.
- Saagar Shaikh, Actor
