= Latex, Texas =

Unincorporated community in Texas, US

Coordinates: 32°36′17″N 94°02′35″W

Latex is a rural unincorporated community in Harrison County, Texas, United States. It lies approximately 15 miles northeast of the county seat, Marshall. The community's name was derived neither from the rubber product nor the document preparation system, but from the names of the states of Texas and Louisiana, as it is located near the border of the two states.
