= Harleton Independent School District =

School district in Texas

Harleton Independent School District is a public school district based in the community of Harleton, Texas (USA). In 2009, the school district was rated "academically acceptable" by the Texas Education Agency.

== Schools ==
The average student-teacher ratio in the school district is 11:1. The school district contains three schools, with 723 enrolled students in total:

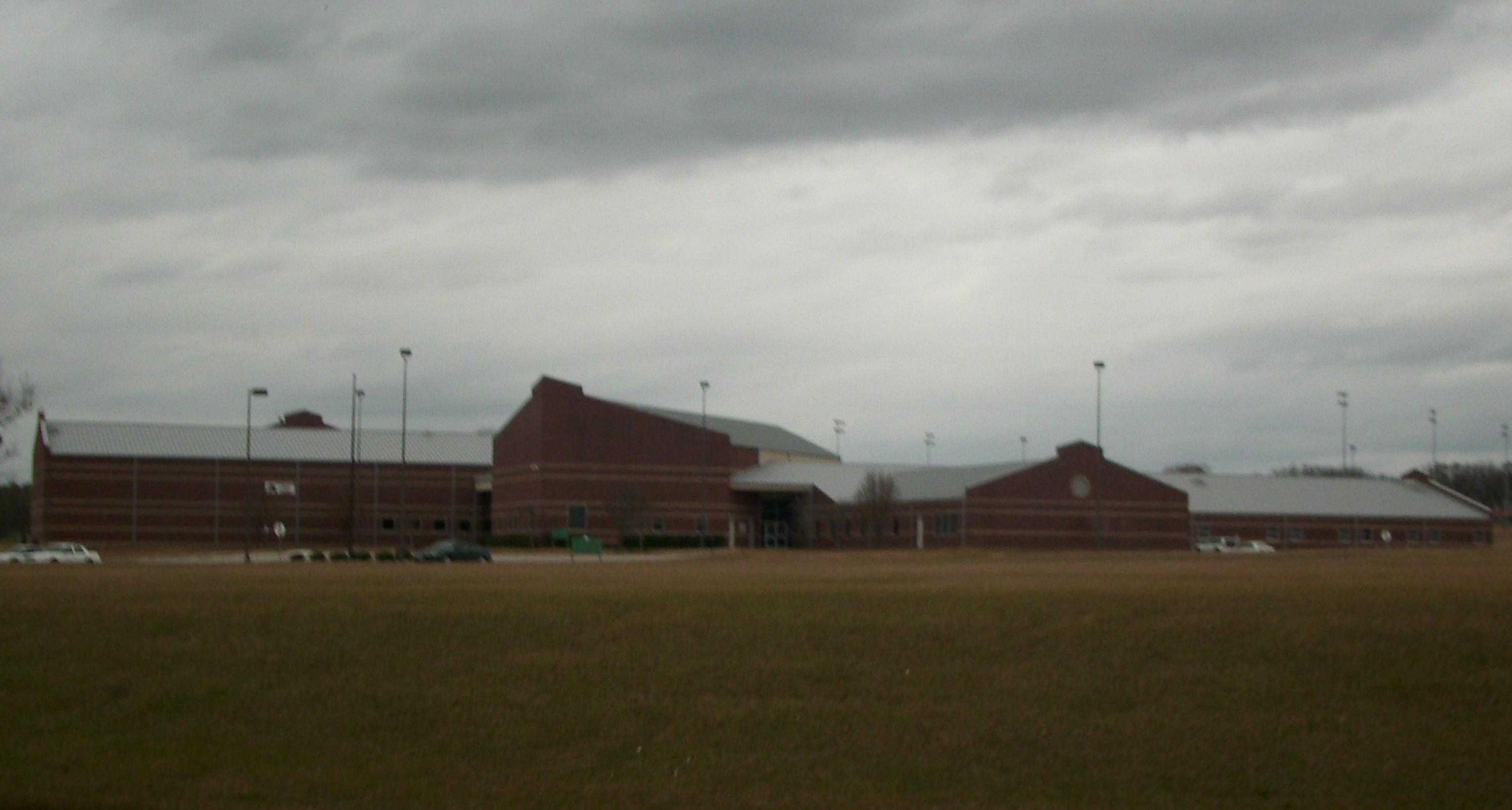
Harleton High School

- Harleton High School (Grades 9-12)
- Harleton Junior High School (Grades 6-8)
- Harleton Elementary School (Grades PK-5)
