= Alamo Regional Mobility Authority =

Authority overview
- Formed: 2003
- Type: Authority
- Jurisdiction: Bexar County
- Headquarters: 233 N. Pecos La Trinidad, Suite 420; San Antonio, TX 78207
- Authority executive: David L. Smith, Interim Executive Director
- Parent authority: Bexar County
- Website: gov.bexar.org/AlamoRMA/about-alamo-rma.html

The Alamo Regional Mobility Authority (ARMA) is an independent government agency created in 2003 to improve the transportation system in Bexar County in the U.S. state Texas. The Mobility Authority is headquartered in Downtown San Antonio.
