= Tyler Independent School District =

Independent school district based in Tyler, Texas

Address
- 1319 Earl Campbell Parkway Tyler, Texas, 75701; United States

District information
- Type: Independent school district
- Grades: Pre-K - 12
- Superintendent: Marty Crawford
- School board: R. Wade Washmon; Yvonne Atkins; Aaron Martinez; Lindsey Harrison; Artis Newsome; Andy Bergfeld; Cody Levrets
- NCES District ID: 4843470

Students and staff
- Students: 18,147
- Teachers: 1,272
- Staff: 2,847

Other information
- Website: tylerisd.org

Tyler Independent School District is an independent school district based in Tyler, Texas (USA).

In addition to serving most of Tyler, the district serves the city of Noonday and rural areas in west central Smith County. Notable alumni include Earl Campbell (Tyler High) and Sandy Duncan (Tyler Legacy High).

In 2019, the school district was rated as a "B" by the Texas Education Agency.

== History ==
Like other Texas school districts, Tyler ISD formerly separated children into different schools on the basis of race. The district established a plan to racially integrate; the board of trustees approved such a plan in 1965, eleven years after the Supreme Court's landmark ruling in Brown v. Board of Education. The district was not fully integrated until July 1970, after a federal court ordered immediate integration.

In 1982, Tyler ISD was party to the Supreme Court Case Plyler v. Doe, which overturned its 1977 policy of charging an annual $1,000 tuition fee to undocumented immigrant children to compensate for the funding lost when the state of Texas prohibited the use of state funds for children who had not been legally admitted to the country. The landmark case concerned whether the Equal Protection Clause could be applied to undocumented immigrants.

In 2020, both of its high schools were renamed: Robert E. Lee High School to Tyler Legacy High School, and John Tyler High School back to its original name Tyler High School.

== Demographics ==
Demographics 2021-2022
Ethnicity	Percent
White	21.5 %
Hispanic	47.4 %
African American	26.6 %
Native American	0.3 %
Asian/Pacific Islander	1.4 %
Two or More Races	2.9 %

== Leadership ==
=== School Board ===
The District is run by a seven-member school board of trustees who are elected in single member districts to three-year terms each May.

TISD Board of Trustees
	Current Member Name	Role	Trustee since	Current term expires in
District 1	R. Wade Washmon	President	2013	2025
District 3	Yvonne Atkins	Trustee	2020	2025
District 2	Artis Newsome	Trustee	2020	2026
District 4	Cody Levrets	Trustee	2023	2026
District 5	Aaron D. Martinez	Trustee	2015	2027
District 6	Lindsey Harrison	Trustee	2021	2025
District 7	Andy Bergfeld	Trustee	2012	2027

Former Trustees include: Rev. Fritz Hager Jr, Rev. Orenthia Mason, Freeman Sterling, Jean Washington and Therelee Washington.

== Schools ==
=== High Schools (Grades 9-12) ===
- Tyler Legacy High School (1958)
- Tyler High School (1912)
- Early College High School (2015)
- RISE Academy

=== Middle Schools (Grades 6-8) ===
- Boulter Middle School (1960)
- Hubbard Middle School (1964)
- Moore MST Magnet School (1955)
- Three Lakes Middle School (2015)

=== Elementary Schools (Grades PK-5) ===
- Austin Elementary
- Bell Elementary
- Bonner Elementary
- Clarkston Elementary
- Dixie Elementary
- Douglas Elementary
- Griffin Elementary
- Jack Elementary
- Jones Elementary
- Orr Elementary
- Owens Elementary
- Peete Elementary
- Ramey Elementary
- Rice Elementary
- Woods Elementary

=== Innovation Schools (Grades PK-8) ===
- Caldwell Arts Academy
- Birdwell Dual Language Immersion School

=== Auxiliary Facilities ===
Tyler ISD also maintains the Professional Development Complex (located adjacent to Peete Elementary in Tyler). This facility houses a small number of information technology staff and serves as a large training facility for Tyler ISD faculty and staff. It is located in the building which served as the former campus of Peete Elementary (commonly called, "The Old Peete Campus"). Gary Elementary also serves as the district's site for elementary gifted and talented education (referred to as the TARGET program)

=== School Photographs ===
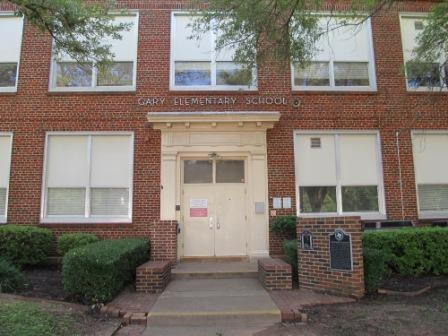
Gary Elementary School

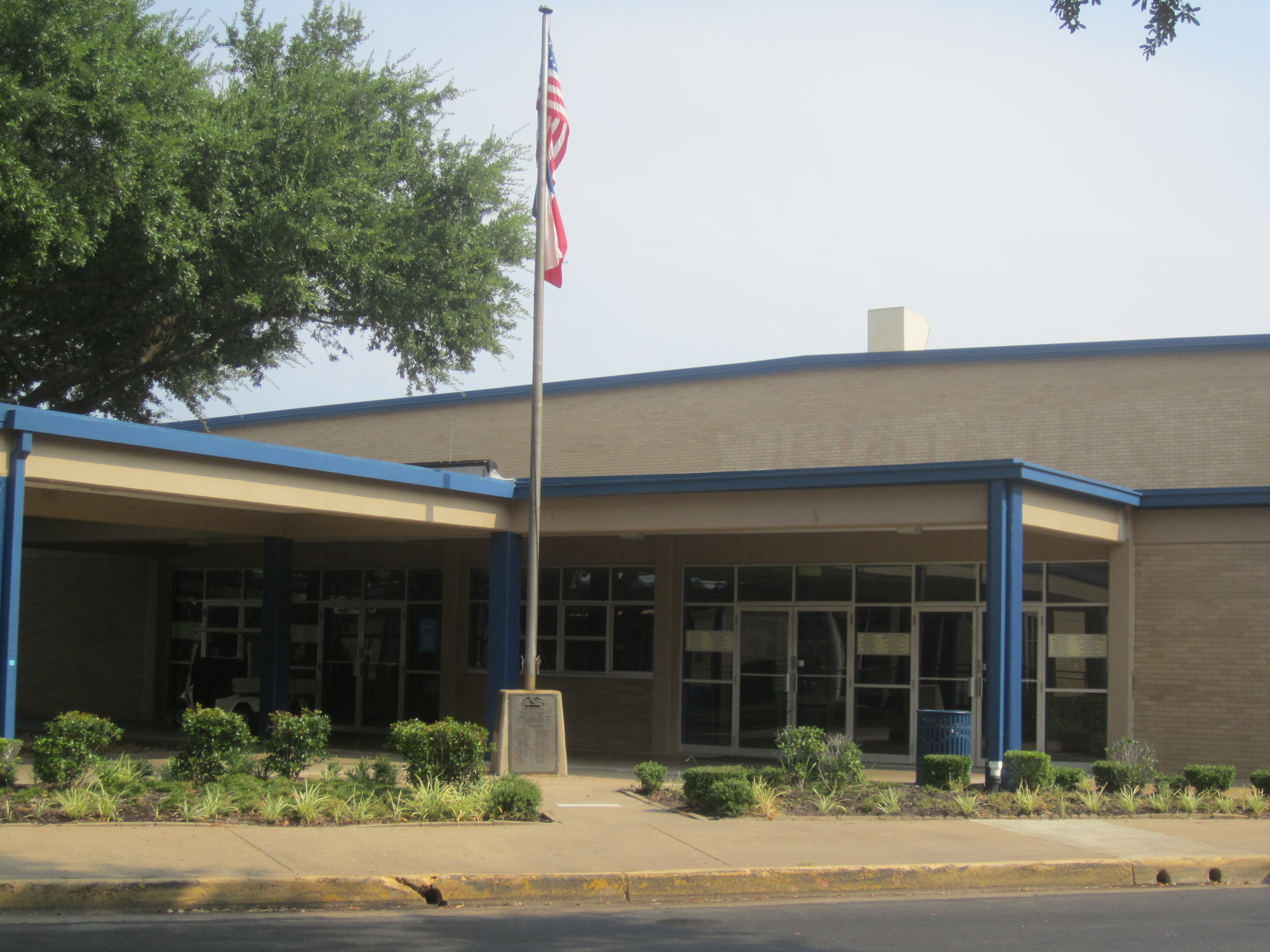
Tyler High School
