= Woodlawn, Texas =

Unincorporated community in Texas, US

Coordinates: 32°40′06″N 94°20′45″W

Woodlawn is a rural unincorporated community in north-central Harrison County, Texas, United States.

Woodlawn is located eight miles north of the county seat, Marshall, on U.S. Route 59 (future Interstate 369).

The Marshall Independent School District serves area students.
