= Noonday, Texas =

- City
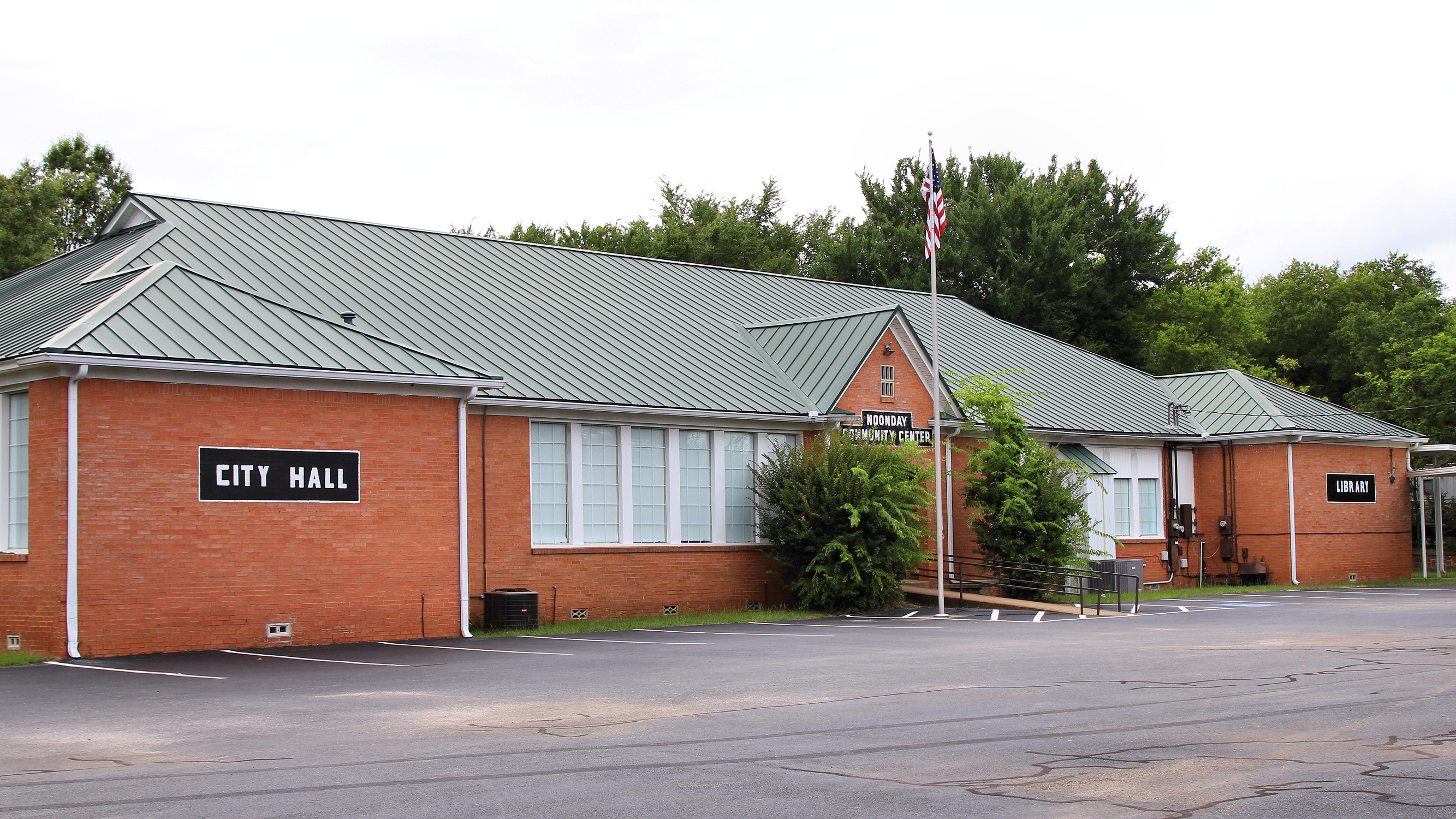
- City hall and library

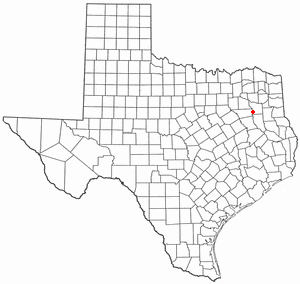
- Location of Noonday, Texas

- Coordinates: 32°15′02″N 95°23′37″W
- Country: United States
- State: Texas
- County: Smith

Government
  - Type: Type A General Law Municipality

Area
  - Total: 2.10 sq mi (5.45 km^{2})
  - Land: 2.08 sq mi (5.40 km^{2})
  - Water: 0.019 sq mi (0.05 km^{2})
- Elevation: 446 ft (136 m)

Population (2020)
  - Total: 612
  - Density: 346.5/sq mi (133.79/km^{2})
- Time zone: UTC-6 (Central (CST))
  - Summer (DST): UTC-5 (CDT)
- ZIP code: 75762
- Area codes: 430, 903
- FIPS code: 48-51756
- GNIS feature ID: 2411264
- Website: cityofnoonday.com

Noonday is a city in Smith County, Texas, United States. The population was 612 at the 2020 census. It is part of the Tyler, Texas Metropolitan Statistical Area.

Noonday is perhaps best known for the "Noonday Onion," reputed to be one of the sweetest onions available. An onion must be grown within a ten-mile radius of Noonday in order to be considered a "Noonday Onion". The "Noonday Onion Festival" is held each year in May.

== History ==
The area was settled by the 1860s and in 1880 a post office was established there.

== Geography ==
According to the United States Census Bureau, the city has a total area of 2.0 square miles (5.2 km^{2}), all land.

== Demographics ==
Historical population
Census	Pop.	Note	%±
1990	466		—
2000	515		10.5%
2010	777		50.9%
2020	612		−21.2%
U.S. Decennial Census

=== 2020 census ===
As of the 2020 census, Noonday had a population of 612, with 258 households and 122 families residing in the city; the median age was 50.5 years, 17.5% of residents were under the age of 18, and 22.5% were 65 years of age or older. For every 100 females there were 94.9 males, and for every 100 females age 18 and over there were 95.0 males age 18 and over.

Of the 258 households, 29.1% had children under the age of 18 living in them. Of all households, 58.5% were married-couple households, 15.9% were households with a male householder and no spouse or partner present, and 20.2% were households with a female householder and no spouse or partner present. About 22.1% of all households were made up of individuals and 8.5% had someone living alone who was 65 years of age or older.

There were 281 housing units, of which 8.2% were vacant. The homeowner vacancy rate was 3.3% and the rental vacancy rate was 7.9%.

0.0% of residents lived in urban areas, while 100.0% lived in rural areas.

Racial composition as of the 2020 census
Race	Number	Percent
White	457	74.7%
Black or African American	71	11.6%
American Indian and Alaska Native	4	0.7%
Asian	6	1.0%
Native Hawaiian and Other Pacific Islander	0	0.0%
Some other race	38	6.2%
Two or more races	36	5.9%
Hispanic or Latino (of any race)	72	11.8%

=== 2000 census ===
As of the census of 2000, there were 515 people, 206 households, and 152 families residing in the city. The population density was 258.6 inhabitants per square mile (99.8/km^{2}). There were 222 housing units at an average density of 111.5 per square mile (43.1/km^{2}). The racial makeup of the city was 93.20% White, 6.02% African American, 0.19% Native American, 0.39% Asian, and 0.19% from two or more races. Hispanic or Latino of any race were 3.50% of the population.

There were 206 households, out of which 29.6% had children under the age of 18 living with them, 66.5% were married couples living together, 5.8% had a female householder with no husband present, and 26.2% were non-families. 21.4% of all households were made up of individuals, and 10.7% had someone living alone who was 65 years of age or older. The average household size was 2.50 and the average family size was 2.93.

In the city, the population was spread out, with 25.0% under the age of 18, 4.5% from 18 to 24, 30.5% from 25 to 44, 25.8% from 45 to 64, and 14.2% who were 65 years of age or older. The median age was 39 years. For every 100 females, there were 85.3 males. For every 100 females age 18 and over, there were 89.2 males.

The median income for a household in the city was $51,625, and the median income for a family was $58,929. Males had a median income of $38,438 versus $23,036 for females. The per capita income for the city was $20,594. About 4.6% of families and 8.5% of the population were below the poverty line, including 14.4% of those under age 18 and 8.3% of those age 65 or over.

== Education ==
In 1884 the City of Noonday had one District School; in 1894 there were two schools. Records show in 1903 there was one school with three teachers and 50 students and another with two teachers and 122 students. By 1969 the schools had been absorbed into the Bullard Independent School District. Currently, the City of Noonday is served by the Tyler Independent School District.

== Public Services ==
The Noonday Volunteer Fire Department provides fire protection to those who reside in the city limits, in addition to the outlying surrounding area. While a majority of the department is volunteers, a crew of paid firemen man the station during the week.

The Noonday City Marshal's Office provides law enforcement services in the city. The Smith County Sheriff's Office out of Tyler also serves the area.
