= Marshall Independent School District =

Texan school district

This article is part of the
Marshall series.

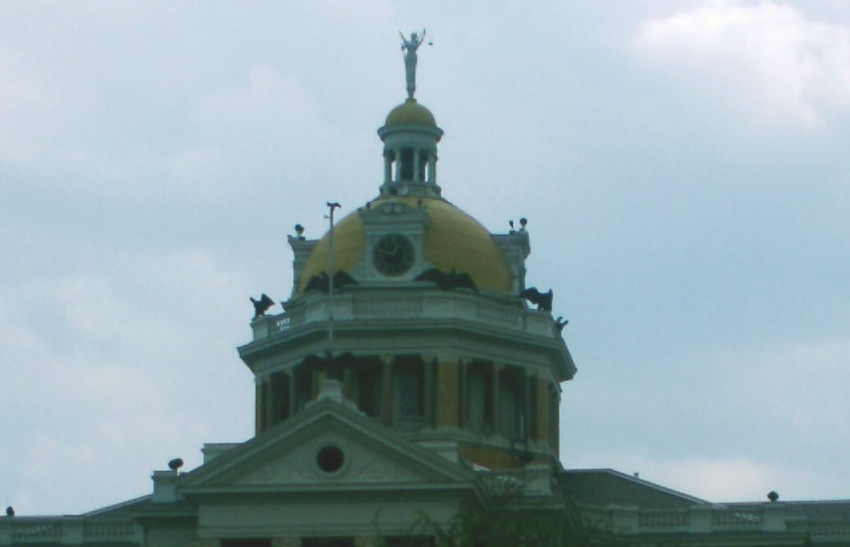

History
Media
People
Places
Marshall ISD
edit this box

Marshall Independent School District is a public 5A school district based in Marshall, Texas (USA) that serves nearly 6,000 students Pre-K through 12th Grade and 400 employees and staff.

In addition to Marshall, it also serves the surrounding communities of Nesbitt, Scottsville, and Woodlawn.

The school district was rated "academically acceptable" in the 2017 Texas Education Agency accountability rating.

== History ==
In 2021, Richele Langley became the superintendent.

== Schools ==
Secondary schools

- Marshall High School (Grades 9–12)
- Marshall Junior High School (Grades 6–8)

Elementary schools

- Price T. Young Elementary
- Sam Houston Elementary (STEM), opened in 2017
- David Crockett Elementary School
- William B. Travis Elementary

Pre K/Head Start

- Washington Early Childhood Center (Formerly Booker T. Washington Elementary)

=== Former campuses ===
- Sam Houston Elementary (opened 1905; closed 1981; burned 2010)
- Marshall Junior-Senior High (Former high school that was closed in 2017.)
- J.H. Moore Elementary (Closed in 2017 and is now The Bridge of Compassion Resale Shop.)
- Pemberton High School (Closed in 1988. Structure now part of Wiley College.)
- Dogan (Closed in 1981 and now abandoned.)
- Dunbar Elementary (demolished.)
- Robert E. Lee Elementary
- South Marshall Elementary (now used as Disciplinary Alternative Education Program And Little Mavs Daycare)
- Isaac Van Zandt (Closed in 1981. Structure now part of ETBU)
- Stephen F. Austin (Burned in 1969. Current site of Travis Elementary School.)
- West End City School (Closed and demolished sometime during the 20th century.. On the same plot as the former Junior High)
- Canaan Elementary School (A Rosenwald School that closed in 1963. Canaan Missionary Baptist Church is near the site.)
- George Washington Carver Elementary (closed 2017)
- Central High/Hillside School
- Texas Early College High School
