= Scottsville, Texas =

- City
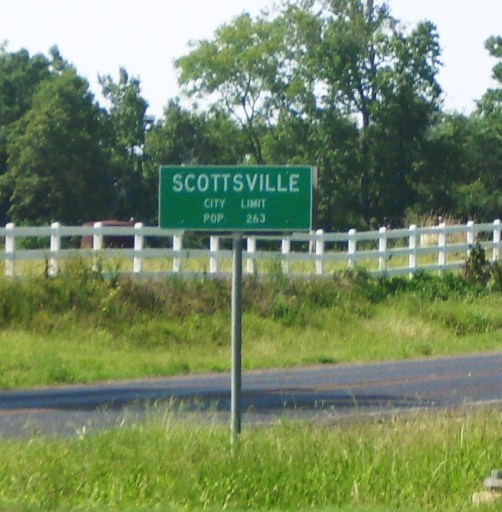
- City limit sign at the intersection of US 80 and FM 2199

- Location of Scottsville in Harrison County, Texas
- Coordinates: 32°31′50″N 94°14′45″W
- Country: United States
- State: Texas
- County: Harrison

Area
  - Total: 1.32 sq mi (3.41 km^{2})
  - Land: 1.32 sq mi (3.41 km^{2})
  - Water: 0 sq mi (0.00 km^{2})
- Elevation: 371 ft (113 m)

Population (2020)
  - Total: 334
  - Density: 254/sq mi (97.9/km^{2})
- Time zone: UTC-6 (Central (CST))
  - Summer (DST): UTC-5 (CDT)
- ZIP code: 75688
- Area codes: 903, 430
- FIPS code: 48-66332
- GNIS feature ID: 2411846

Scottsville is a city in Harrison County, Texas, United States. The population was 376 at the 2010 census, up from 263 at the 2000 census. Scottsville's population in 2020 decreased to 334.

== History ==
The area was initially settled by William Thomas Scott, his wife Mary Rose, and other members of their families in June 1840. He quickly acquired several large parcels of land, established five cotton plantations, including Scottsville Plantation, his residence, constructed by slaves. Scott's lavish plantation was said to be identical to Jefferson Davis' mansion in Mississippi, and he eventually became the largest slave owner in Harrison County.

On August 4, 1869, Scottsville was granted a post office. The community had an estimated population of 300 in 1929. In 1936, a historical marker was erected in Scottsville to commemorate both the founding of the community and the centennial of Texas Independence. During the Great Depression, the population fell to a low of 50, but had recovered to 260 by the 1950s. The number of inhabitants remained steady throughout the latter half of the twentieth century in contrast to Uncertain, Texas.

== Geography ==
Scottsville is located along Farm Roads 1998 and 2199, north of U.S. Highway 80 in east-central Harrison County. It is 8 miles (13 km) east of the center of Marshall, the county seat. US 80, which forms the southern border of Scottsville, leads west into Marshall and east 11 miles (18 km) to Waskom. Interstate 20 passes 3 miles (5 km) south of the center of Scottsville, with access from exit 624 (Farm to Market Road 2199).

According to the United States Census Bureau, Scottsville has a total area of 1.3 square miles (3.4 km^{2}), all land.

=== Climate ===
The climate in this area is characterized by hot, humid summers and generally mild to cool winters. According to the Köppen Climate Classification system, Scottsville has a humid subtropical climate, abbreviated "Cfa" on climate maps.

== Demographics ==
Historical population
Census	Pop.	Note	%±
1970	259		—
1980	245		−5.4%
1990	283		15.5%
2000	263		−7.1%
2010	376		43.0%
2020	334		−11.2%
U.S. Decennial Census

=== Racial and ethnic composition ===
Scottsville city, Texas – Racial and ethnic composition Note: the US Census treats Hispanic/Latino as an ethnic category. This table excludes Latinos from the racial categories and assigns them to a separate category. Hispanics/Latinos may be of any race.
Race / Ethnicity (NH = Non-Hispanic)	Pop 2000	Pop 2010	Pop 2020	% 2000	% 2010	% 2020
White alone (NH)	110	153	125	41.83%	40.69%	37.43%
Black or African American alone (NH)	144	174	136	54.75%	46.28%	40.72%
Native American or Alaska Native alone (NH)	0	5	0	0.00%	1.33%	0.00%
Asian alone (NH)	0	7	0	0.00%	1.86%	0.00%
Native Hawaiian or Pacific Islander alone (NH)	0	0	3	0.00%	0.00%	0.90%
Other race alone (NH)	0	0	0	0.00%	0.00%	0.00%
Mixed race or Multiracial (NH)	5	10	15	1.90%	2.66%	4.49%
Hispanic or Latino (any race)	4	27	55	1.52%	7.18%	16.47%
Total	263	376	334	100.00%	100.00%	100.00%

=== 2020 census ===
As of the 2020 census, Scottsville had a population of 334. The median age was 36.5 years. 27.5% of residents were under the age of 18 and 12.9% of residents were 65 years of age or older. For every 100 females there were 78.6 males, and for every 100 females age 18 and over there were 71.6 males age 18 and over.

0.0% of residents lived in urban areas, while 100.0% lived in rural areas.

There were 112 households in Scottsville, of which 41.1% had children under the age of 18 living in them. Of all households, 54.5% were married-couple households, 14.3% were households with a male householder and no spouse or partner present, and 29.5% were households with a female householder and no spouse or partner present. About 22.4% of all households were made up of individuals and 8.0% had someone living alone who was 65 years of age or older.

There were 134 housing units, of which 16.4% were vacant. The homeowner vacancy rate was 2.9% and the rental vacancy rate was 17.6%.

Racial composition as of the 2020 census
Race	Number	Percent
White	139	41.6%
Black or African American	138	41.3%
American Indian and Alaska Native	3	0.9%
Asian	0	0.0%
Native Hawaiian and Other Pacific Islander	4	1.2%
Some other race	26	7.8%
Two or more races	24	7.2%

=== 2010 census ===
In 2010 Scottsville had a population of 376. The racial composition of the population was 44.4% white, 46.3% black or African American, 1.3% Native American, 1.6% Vietnamese, 0.3% other Asian, 2.7% from some other race and 3.5% from two or more races. 7.2% of the population was Hispanic or Latino of any race.

=== 2000 census ===
According to the census of 2000, there were 263 people, 91 households, and 66 families residing in the city. The population density was 200.5 inhabitants per square mile (77.4/km^{2}). There were 99 housing units at an average density of 75.5 per square mile (29.2/km^{2}). The racial makeup of the city was 42.97% White, 54.75% African American, 0.38% from other races, and 1.90% from two or more races. Hispanic or Latino of any race were 1.52% of the population.

There were 91 households, out of which 41.8% had children under the age of 18 living with them, 45.1% were married couples living together, 24.2% had a female householder with no husband present, and 26.4% were non-families. 24.2% of all households were made up of individuals, and 13.2% had someone living alone who was 65 years of age or older. The average household size was 2.89 and the average family size was 3.39.

In the city, the population was spread out, with 33.5% under the age of 18, 6.1% from 18 to 24, 27.8% from 25 to 44, 22.4% from 45 to 64, and 10.3% who were 65 years of age or older. The median age was 33 years. For every 100 females, there were 77.7 males. For every 100 females age 18 and over, there were 65.1 males.

The median income for a household in the city was $31,000, and the median income for a family was $30,250. Males had a median income of $30,625 versus $18,750 for females. The per capita income for the city was $16,225. About 19.7% of families and 21.0% of the population were below the poverty line, including 32.7% of those under the age of eighteen and 7.7% of those 65 or over.

== Education ==
Public education in the city of Scottsville is provided by the Marshall Independent School District. The zoned elementary school is David Crockett Elementary School (grades K–5), and the secondary schools are Marshall Junior High School and Marshall High School. Previously students in grades 5-6 were zoned to Sam Houston Middle School.

Panola College is the assigned community college for the majority of Harrison County, Scottsville included, according to the Texas Education Code.
