= Waskom, Texas =

- City
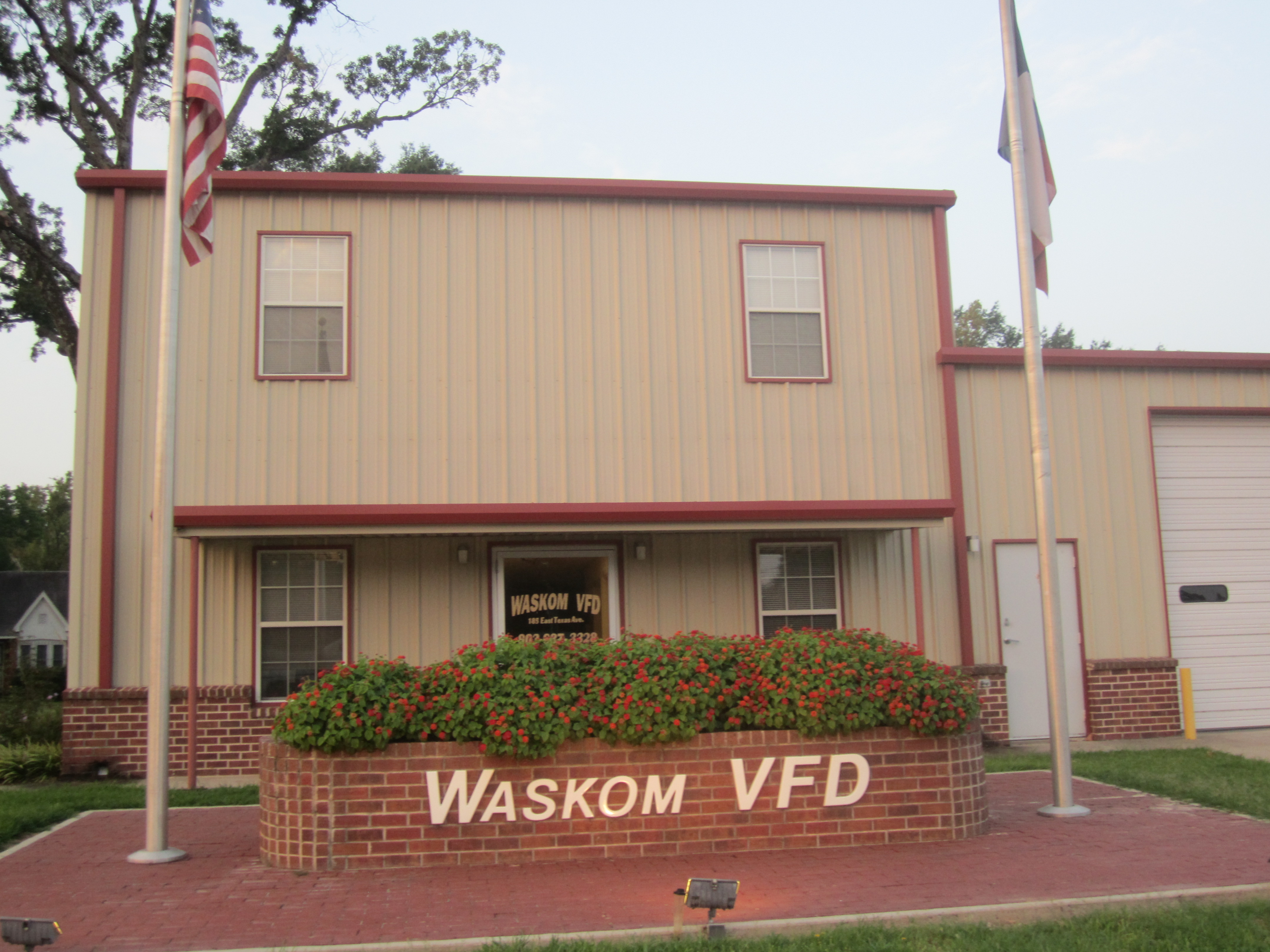
- Waskom Volunteer Fire Department
- Nickname: The Gateway to Texas
- Location within Harrison County

- Location within Texas Location within the United States Location within North America
- Coordinates: 32°28′36″N 94°03′52″W
- Country: United States
- State: Texas
- County: Harrison

Area
  - Total: 2.68 sq mi (6.94 km^{2})
  - Land: 2.68 sq mi (6.94 km^{2})
  - Water: 0 sq mi (0.00 km^{2})
- Elevation: 279 ft (85 m)

Population (2020)
  - Total: 1,910
  - Density: 713/sq mi (275/km^{2})
- Time zone: UTC-6 (Central (CST))
  - Summer (DST): UTC-5 (CDT)
- ZIP code: 75692
- Area codes: 430, 903
- FIPS code: 48-76636
- GNIS feature ID: 2412190
- Website: City of Waskom

Waskom is a city in the U.S. state of Texas with a 2020 census-tabulated population of 1,910, down from 2,160 residents in 2010. It is located in Harrison County and lies approximately 19 miles (31 km) east of the county seat, Marshall, on U.S. 80 and Interstate 20. Waskom forms part of Greater Marshall, which is also included in the Longview–Marshall combined statistical area in the Ark-La-Tex region. To the east are the cities of Greenwood and Shreveport, Louisiana.

== History ==
The city of Waskom was established in 1850 as Powell Town, presumably for Jonathan S. Powell, who owned a land grant in the area. It was founded as a midway point for an east-west (Dallas to Shreveport) cattle and cotton economic trail to the Red River in Louisiana.

From 1850 to 1872 it had a post office as Powellton. In 1872, it became a main railroad station between Dallas, Texarkana, and Shreveport. The city's named was changed to Waskom Station in 1872 and to Waskom in 1881 after J. M. Waskom, a director of the Southern Pacific Railroad.

In 2014 and 2015, Waskom High School won the 2 state title in football.

In June 2019, the city council voted to outlaw abortion in the city, declaring Waskom a "sanctuary city for the unborn" (the first such city to designate itself as such), as state governments elsewhere in the United States also were drafting abortion bans. There is currently no abortion clinic in the city. The Waskom ordinance has led other small cities in Texas (and, as of April 2021, in Nebraska) to vote in favor of becoming "sanctuary cities for the unborn." In May 2021, Lubbock became the largest Texas city to ban abortion following Waskom.

== Geography ==
Waskom is located in eastern Harrison County. The eastern border of the city is the Texas–Louisiana border. Interstate 20 provides access to the city from Exit 633 on the west side and Exit 635 to the south. Interstate 20 leads east 20 miles (32 km) to Shreveport and west 166 miles (267 km) to Dallas.

According to the United States Census Bureau, the city has a total area of 2.7 square miles (6.9 km^{2}), all land. The city drains to the north towards Paw Paw Bayou and to the south towards tributaries of Cross Bayou. Both bayous run east to Cross Lake, which flows out to the Red River in Shreveport.

== Demographics ==
Historical population
Census	Pop.	Note	%±
1940	564		—
1950	719		27.5%
1960	1,336		85.8%
1970	1,460		9.3%
1980	1,821		24.7%
1990	1,812		−0.5%
2000	2,068		14.1%
2010	2,160		4.4%
2020	1,910		−11.6%
U.S. Decennial Census

As of the 2020 United States census, there were 1,910 people, 589 households, and 436 families residing in the city.

In 2018 there was an estimated population of 1,887, a decrease of 273 inhabitants since the 2010 census. Per the American Community Survey's 2018 estimates, a total of 598 households and 468 families resided in Waskom. There were 833 housing units in 2018. At the census of 2010 and the American Community Survey's estimates, there were 2,160 people, 732 households, and 460 families residing in the city. The population density was 750.0 inhabitants per square mile (289.6/km^{2}) in 2000. There were 868 housing units in 2010.

In 2000, there were 790 households, out of which 34.7% had children under the age of 18 living with them, 51.9% were married couples living together, 15.9% had a female householder with no husband present, and 27.6% were non-families. 24.6% of all households were made up of individuals, and 10.0% had someone living alone who was 65 years of age or older. The average household size was 2.62 and the average family size was 3.10.

In the city, the population was spread out, with 28.6% under the age of 18, 8.9% from 18 to 24, 26.6% from 25 to 44, 23.7% from 45 to 64, and 12.0% who were 65 years of age or older. The median age was 35 years. For every 100 females, there were 99.0 males. For every 100 females age 18 and over, there were 93.4 males.

The median income for a household in the city was $29,737, and the median income for a family was $32,243. Males had a median income of $29,625 versus $18,859 for females. The per capita income for the city was $13,080. About 19.4% of families and 24.2% of the population were below the poverty line, including 35.5% of those under age 18 and 14.8% of those age 65 or over.

In 2018, 48.1% of households had children under the age of 18 living with them. The average household size was 3.16 and the average family size was 3.59. The median age of Waskom was 49.9. The median income was $29,844. In 2020 the average rent for a two-bedroom apartment was $799 according to Sperling's BestPlaces, making it relatively cheaper than neighboring Shreveport, Louisiana.

=== Race and ethnicity ===
Waskom racial composition as of 2020 (NH = Non-Hispanic) (Note: Note: the US Census treats Hispanic/Latino as an ethnic category. This table excludes Latinos from the racial categories and assigns them to a separate category. Hispanics/Latinos can be of any race.)
Race	Number	Percentage
White (NH)	1,089	57.02%
Black or African American (NH)	249	13.04%
Native American or Alaska Native (NH)	12	0.63%
Asian (NH)	6	0.31%
Some Other Race (NH)	2	0.1%
Mixed/Multi-Racial (NH)	85	4.45%
Hispanic or Latino	467	24.45%
Total	1,910	

At the 2020 census, its racial composition was 57.02% non-Hispanic white, 13.04% Black or African American, 0.63% Native American or Alaska Native, 0.31% Asian, 0.1% some other race, 4.45% multiracial, and 24.25% Hispanic or Latino of any race. The racial makeup in 2018 was 61.0% non-Hispanic white, 17.1% Black or African American, 0.7% Native American or Alaskan Native, and 2.2% from two or more races. Hispanics or Latinos of any race were 19.0% of the city's populace. The 2010 U.S. census determined Waskom's population was 69.77% White, 13.29% Black or African American, 0.93% Native American or Alaska Native, 2.22% two or more races, 13.56% some other race, 0.23% Asian, and 19.58% Hispanic or Latino of any race. In 2000, the racial makeup of the city was 75.05% White, 15.76% Black or African American, 0.63% Native American, 0.15% Asian, 7.16% from other races, and 1.26% from two or more races. Hispanic and Latin Americans of any race were 9.86% of the population.

=== Religion ===
Waskom and Harrison County are predominantly Christian areas, typical of the Bible Belt. The largest Christian tradition in the city of Waskom are the Baptists, followed by Methodists and Catholics. Of the Baptist population, the largest denomination is the Southern Baptist Convention. Predominantly African American-led Baptist churches are either independent Baptist, or part of the National Baptist Convention (USA or America). There is one United Methodist congregation in the city limits, and one Catholic church.

== Education ==
The city is served by the Waskom Independent School District.

== Media ==
Waskom is within the media market of the Shreveport-Bossier City metropolitan statistical area.

The city's newspaper market is primarily served by The Marshall News Messenger and The Waskom Post. The Shreveport Times, owned by USA Today, also has circulation within Waskom.

== Notable people ==
- Shelby Singleton, record producer
- Grady Gaines, blues saxophonist
- Junior Moore, baseball player
