= Harleton, Texas =

Unincorporated community in Texas, US

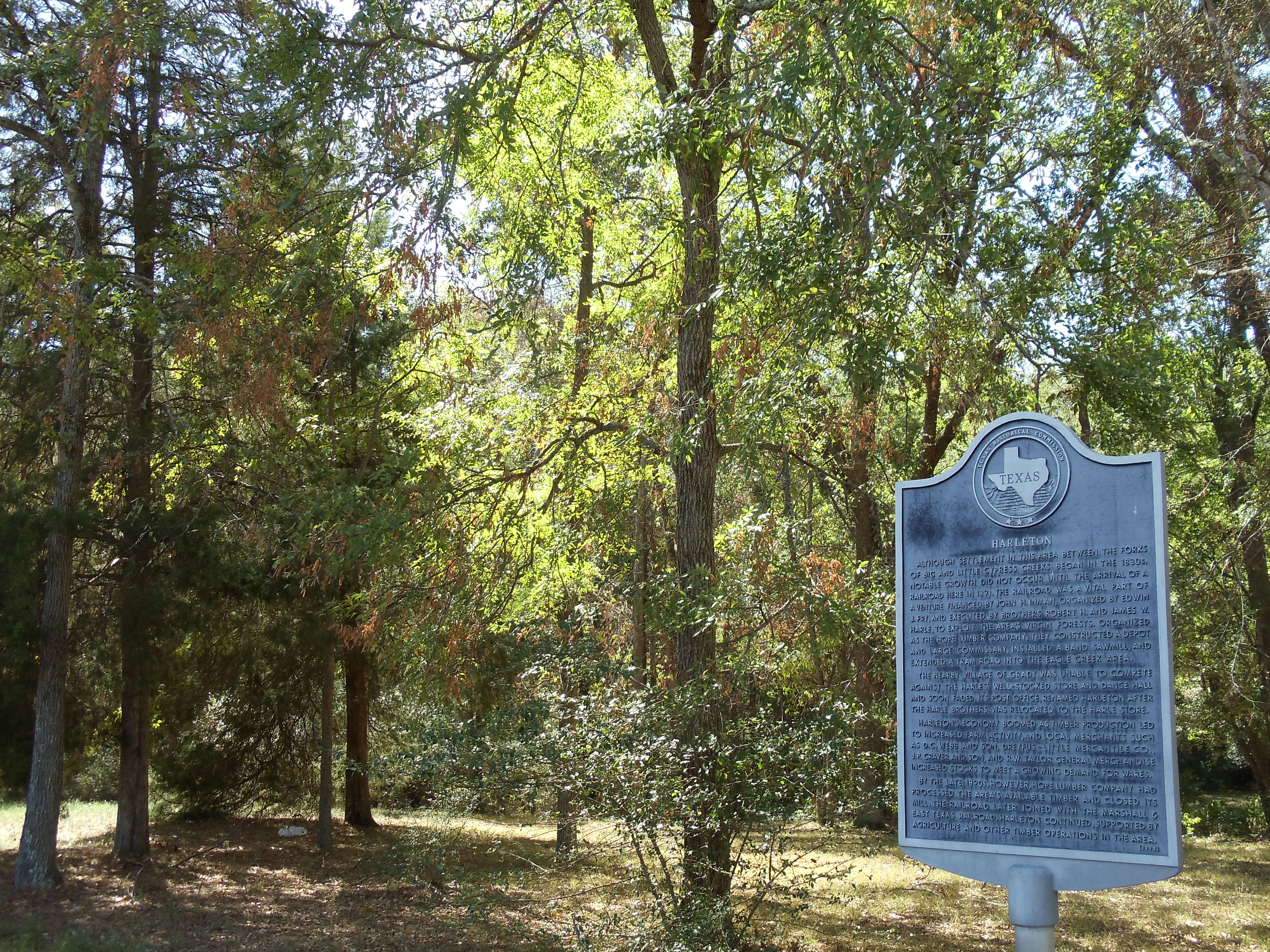

- Location within Texas Location within the United States
- Coordinates: 32°40′36″N 94°34′29″W
- Country: The United States of America
- State: Texas
- County: Harrison
- First Settled: ca. 1890
- Elevation: 318 ft (97 m)
- Time zone: UTC-6 (Central (CST))
  - Summer (DST): UTC-5 (CDT)
- ZIP code: 75651
- Area code: 903
- GNIS feature ID: 1337353

Harleton is an unincorporated community in Harrison County, Texas, United States. This is the county's only large settlement north of Little Cypress Creek, a tributary of the Big Cypress Bayou and the Red River of the South.

== Education ==
Harleton is served by the Harleton Independent School District.
