= Harrison County, Texas =

County in Texas, United States

- County
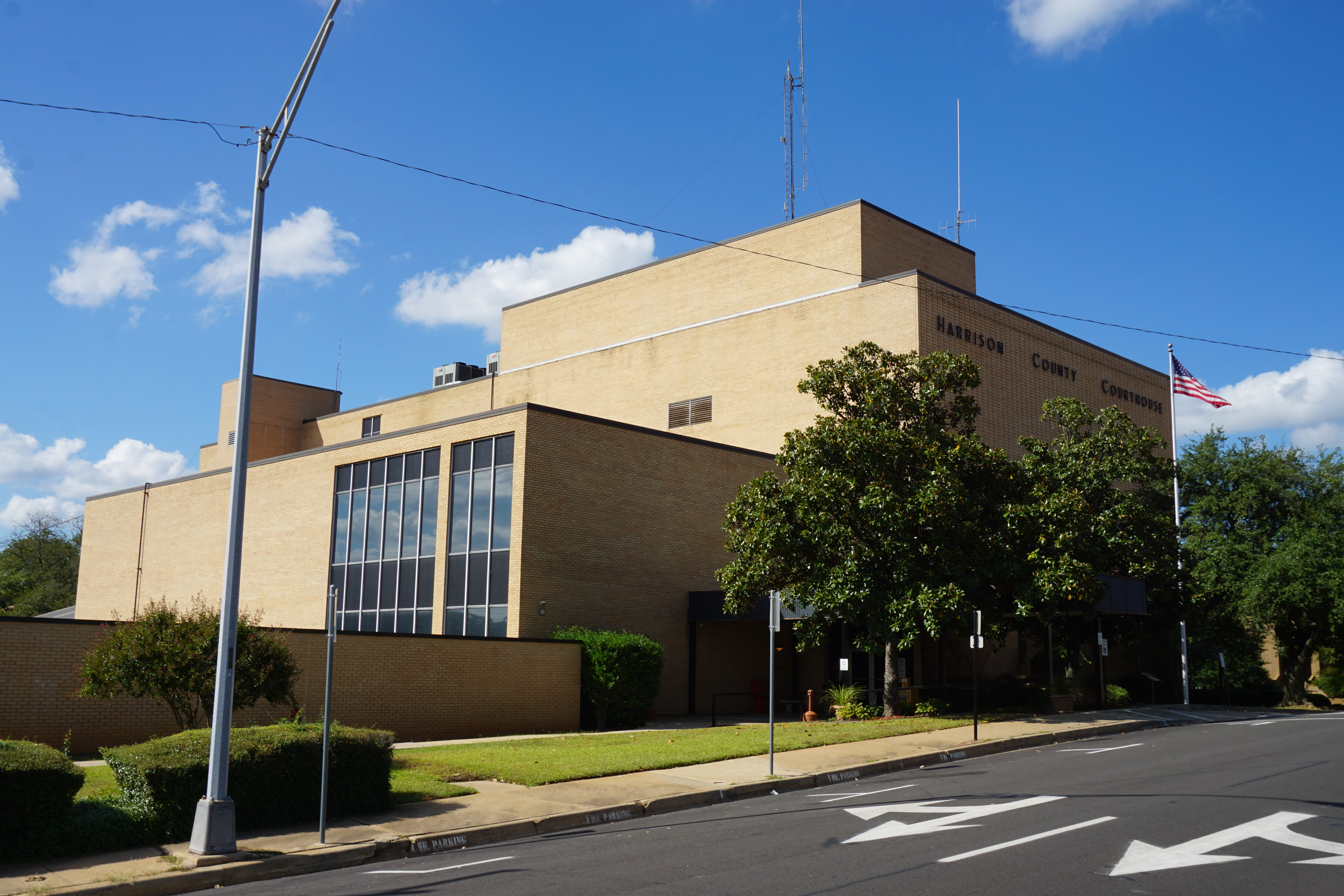
- Harrison County Courthouse in Marshall

- Location within the U.S. state of Texas
- Coordinates: 32°33′N 94°22′W
- Country: United States
- State: Texas
- Founded: 1842
- Named for: Jonas Harrison
- Seat: Marshall
- Largest city: Marshall

Area
  - Total: 916 sq mi (2,370 km^{2})
  - Land: 900 sq mi (2,300 km^{2})
  - Water: 16 sq mi (41 km^{2}) 1.7%

Population (2020)
  - Total: 68,839
  - Estimate (2025): 71,956 ▲
  - Density: 75/sq mi (29/km^{2})
- Time zone: UTC−6 (Central)
  - Summer (DST): UTC−5 (CDT)
- Congressional district: 1st
- Website: www.harrisoncountytexas.gov

Harrison County is a county on the eastern side of U.S. state of Texas bordering with the state of Louisiana. As of the 2020 United States census, its population was 68,839. The county seat is Marshall. The county was created in 1839 and organized in 1842. It is named for Jonas Harrison, a lawyer and Texas revolutionary.

Developed for cotton plantations by planters from the South, this county had the highest number of enslaved African Americans in Texas before the Civil War. They comprised 59% of the population. From 1870 to 1930, blacks made up 60% of the county's population. In the post-Reconstruction era, whites used lynchings to assert their dominance, in addition to the state's disenfranchisement of Blacks. From 1940 to 1970, in the second wave of the Great Migration, many blacks moved to the West Coast to escape Jim Crow and for work in the expanding defense industry. More whites have moved in since the late 20th century as the county's economy has developed beyond the rural, and now comprise the majority. Harrison County is included in the Longview metropolitan statistical area. It is located in the Ark-La-Tex region.

== History ==
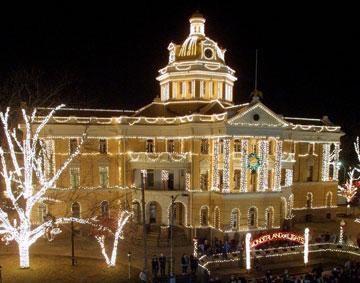
Old Harrison County Courthouse in Marshall lit at Christmas, 2005

=== Early history ===
Settlement by immigrants from the United States began during the 1830s in the territory of present-day Harrison County. In 1835, the Mexican authorities granted a dozen land grants to U.S. immigrants. After the Texas Revolution, the Congress of the Texas Republic established Harrison County in 1839, formed from Shelby County. Harrison County was named for Texas revolutionary Jonas Harrison. The county was organized in 1842. The county's area was reduced in 1846, as territory was taken to establish Panola and Upshur Counties. Marshall was founded in 1841 and was designated as the county seat in 1842.

The area was settled predominantly by planters from the Southern United States, who developed this area for cotton plantations and brought enslaved African Americans with them for labor, or purchased them at regional markets. The planters repeated much of their culture and society here. East Texas was the location of most of the cotton plantations in the state, and correspondingly, of most of the enslaved African Americans. Most of the 14 black-majority, plantation counties were located in East Texas. By 1850, landowners in Harrison County held more slaves than in any other county in Texas until the end of the Civil War. The census of 1860 counted 8,746 slaves in Harrison County, 59% of the county's total population. In 1861, the county's voters (who were exclusively white males and mostly upper class) overwhelmingly supported secession from the United States.

=== Reconstruction era to present ===
Following defeat at the end of the American Civil War, the county was part of an area occupied by Federal troops under Reconstruction. The white minority in the county bitterly resented federal authority and the constitutional amendment granting the franchise to freedmen. A majority in the county, the freedmen elected a biracial county government dominated by Republican Party officeholders. Republican dominance in local offices continued in the county until 1880, but the conservative whites of the Democratic Party regained control of the state government before the official end of Reconstruction. In 1880, the Citizen's Party of Harrison County, amid charges of fraud and coercion, gained control of elected positions in the county government after winning on a technicality, which involved hiding a key ballot box. They retained such control of the county into the 1950s, aided by the state's disenfranchisement of blacks at the turn of the century by a variety of laws, including those to permit white primaries. In addition, during the post-Reconstruction era, white terrorist violence was directed at blacks to assert white supremacy. According to records of the Equal Justice Initiative, Harrison County had the third-highest number of lynchings of any county in Texas from 1877 to 1950.

In the 1870s, the county's nonagricultural sector increased when the Texas and Pacific Railway located its headquarters and shops in Marshall. It stimulated other industries and manufacturing in the county and also aided the transportation to market of the important cotton crop. From 1880 to 1930, though, Harrison County remained primarily agricultural and rural. It had a 60% black majority through 1930. During this period, most of the African Americans worked in agriculture as tenant farmers and sharecroppers. Harrison County had a total of 14 lynchings. Most were committed in the early 20th century, particularly in the 1910s, when the county suffered economic hard times. Whites "did not lynch instead of ineffective courts, but instead demonstrated to the black majority that legal protection and rights were inaccessible to blacks". Blacks accused of violence against law enforcement or who were from outside the county were particularly at risk, but the terrorist lynchings put all blacks on notice that whites could take action against them essentially at will.

The Texas Legislature disenfranchised most blacks in 1901 by requiring poll taxes and authorizing white primaries (after various iterations, the latter were overturned by a U.S. Supreme Court decision in 1944). This disenfranchisement extended into the late 1960s, until after national civil-rights legislation was passed to enforce these citizens' constitutional civil rights.

In 1928, oil was discovered in the county. Its exploitation and processing made a significant contribution to the economy. The Great Depression of the 1930s hit the county hard, decimating the agricultural sector. Mobilization for World War II brought an end to the depression. As the defense industry built up in major cities and on the West Coast, from 1940 to 1970, more than 4.5 million blacks migrated from the South, particularly Texas, Louisiana, and Mississippi, for work and to escape continuing suppression under Jim Crow laws. They moved to the West Coast in the second wave of the Great Migration, attracted to new jobs in the expanding defense industry. The population of the county declined until 1980, when the trend reversed. White migration from other areas has resulted in a majority-white population. In the realignment of parties in the South since the late 20th century, white conservative voters in Texas have left the Democratic Party to become overwhelmingly affiliated with the Republican Party.

== Geography ==
According to the U.S. Census Bureau, the county has a total area of 916 square miles (2,370 km^{2}), of which 16 square miles (41 km^{2}) (1.7%) are covered by water. The northern and eastern parts of the county are drained to the Red River in Louisiana by Little Cypress Creek, Cypress Bayou, and Caddo Lake. The other third of the county is drained by the Sabine River, which forms a part of its southern boundary. These waterways were critical to early transportation in the county.

=== Adjacent counties ===
- Marion County (north)
- Caddo Parish, Louisiana (east)
- Panola County (south)
- Rusk County (southwest)
- Gregg County (west)
- Upshur County (northwest)

=== Major highways ===
- I-20
- Future I-369 / US 59
- US 80
- SH 43
- SH 49
  - Loop 49 – currently proposed
- SH 154
- Loop 281
- Loop 390
- Spur 156
- Spur 449

=== National protected area ===
- Caddo Lake National Wildlife Refuge

== Communities ==
=== Cities ===
- Hallsville
- Longview (mostly in Gregg County)
- Marshall (county seat and largest municipality)
- Scottsville
- Uncertain
- Waskom

=== Unincorporated communities ===
- Elysian Fields
- Gill
- Harleton
- Jonesville
- Karnack
- Latex
- Nesbitt
- Woodlawn

== Demographics ==
Historical population
Census	Pop.	Note	%±
1850	11,822		—
1860	15,001		26.9%
1870	13,241		−11.7%
1880	25,177		90.1%
1890	26,721		6.1%
1900	31,878		19.3%
1910	37,243		16.8%
1920	43,565		17.0%
1930	48,937		12.3%
1940	50,900		4.0%
1950	47,745		−6.2%
1960	45,594		−4.5%
1970	44,841		−1.7%
1980	52,265		16.6%
1990	57,483		10.0%
2000	62,110		8.0%
2010	65,631		5.7%
2020	68,839		4.9%
2025 (est.)	71,956	▲	4.5%
U.S. Decennial Census; 1850–2010 2010–2020

=== Racial and ethnic composition ===
Harrison County, Texas – Racial and ethnic composition Note: the US Census treats Hispanic/Latino as an ethnic category. This table excludes Latinos from the racial categories and assigns them to a separate category. Hispanics/Latinos may be of any race.
Race / Ethnicity (NH = Non-Hispanic)	Pop 1980	Pop 1990	Pop 2000	Pop 2010	Pop 2020	% 1980	% 1990	% 2000	% 2010	% 2020
White alone (NH)	34,992	39,907	43,044	42,654	42,039	66.95%	69.42%	69.30%	64.99%	61.07%
Black or African American alone (NH)	16,252	15,960	14,861	14,303	13,448	31.10%	27.76%	23.93%	21.79%	19.54%
Native American or Alaska Native alone (NH)	93	185	165	277	294	0.18%	0.32%	0.27%	0.42%	0.43%
Asian alone (NH)	64	135	186	331	483	0.12%	0.23%	0.30%	0.50%	0.70%
Native Hawaiian or Pacific Islander alone (NH)	x	x	21	26	28	x	x	0.03%	0.04%	0.04%
Other race alone (NH)	62	18	28	52	267	0.12%	0.03%	0.05%	0.08%	0.39%
Multiracial (NH)	x	x	489	734	2,441	x	x	0.79%	1.12%	3.55%
Hispanic or Latino (any race)	802	1,278	3,316	7,254	9,839	1.53%	2.22%	5.34%	11.05%	14.29%
Total	52,265	57,483	62,110	65,631	68,839	100.00%	100.00%	100.00%	100.00%	100.00%

=== 2020 census ===
As of the 2020 census, the county had a population of 68,839. The median age was 38.6 years; 24.7% of residents were under 18 and 17.1% were 65 or older. For every 100 females, there were 95.5 males, and for every 100 females 18 and over, there were 92.5 males age 18 and over.

The racial makeup of the county was 63.8% White, 19.7% Black or African American, 1.0% American Indian and Alaska Native, 0.7% Asian, 0.1% Native Hawaiian and Pacific Islander, 7.4% from some other race, and 7.3% from two or more races. Hispanics or Latinos of any race comprised 14.3% of the population.

About 45.1% of residents lived in urban areas, while 54.9% lived in rural areas.

Of the 25,648 households in the county, 33.7% had children under 18 living in them, 50.4% were married-couple households, 17.6% were households with a male householder and no spouse or partner present, and 26.8% were households with a female householder and no spouse or partner present. About 25.3% of all households were made up of individuals, and 11.6% had someone living alone who was 65or older.

The county had 29,223 housing units, of which 12.2% were vacant. Among occupied housing units, 72.6% were owner-occupied and 27.4% were renter-occupied. The homeowner vacancy rate was 1.7% and the rental vacancy rate was 9.7%.

=== 2010 census ===
The largest ancestry groups in Harrison County at the 2010 United States census were: English (41%), Black or African American (24%), Irish (8%), German (3%), Scotch-Irish (3%), Scottish (2%), Dutch (1%), Italian (1%), French or French Canadian (except Basque) (1%), Mexican (1%), and Polish (1%).

=== 2000 census ===
In 2000, the 2000 U.S. census reported 62,110 people, 23,087 households, and 16,945 families residing in the county. The population density was 69 people per square mile (27 people/km^{2}). The 26,271 housing units had an average density of 29 units per square mile (11/km^{2}).

At the 2000 census, the racial makeup of the county was 71.35% White, 24.03% Black or African American, 0.35% Native American, 0.31% Asian, 0.04% Pacific Islander, 2.86% from other races, and 1.06% from two or more races; 5.34% of the population were Hispanic or Latino of any race.

=== American Community Survey (2018) ===
At the 2018 American Community Survey, the median household income was $51,202, and 14.7% of the population was below the poverty line. The median gross rent in the county was $779 from 2014 to 2018, and the median house monthly owner costs without mortgage were $403. The median with a mortgage was $1,266.

== Education ==
The following school districts serve Harrison County:

- Elysian Fields ISD (partly in Panola County)
- Hallsville ISD
- Harleton ISD
- Karnack ISD
- Marshall ISD
- New Diana ISD (mostly in Upshur County)
- Ore City ISD (mostly in Upshur County, small portion in Marion County)
- Waskom ISD

Panola College is the assigned community college for the majority of Harrison County, according to the Texas Education Code. The portion in Hallsville ISD is instead zoned to Kilgore Junior College.

== Politics ==
Harrison County is located within District 7 of the Texas House of Representatives. Harrison County is located within District 1 of the Texas Senate.

United States presidential election results for Harrison County, Texas
Year	Republican		Democratic		Third party(ies)	
Year	No.	%	No.	%	No.	%
1912	140	9.70%	1,140	79.00%	163	11.30%
1916	172	10.64%	1,374	85.02%	70	4.33%
1920	377	11.85%	2,134	67.09%	670	21.06%
1924	463	14.19%	2,573	78.88%	226	6.93%
1928	1,776	46.69%	2,023	53.18%	5	0.13%
1932	528	11.47%	4,057	88.12%	19	0.41%
1936	302	8.14%	3,400	91.69%	6	0.16%
1940	681	13.11%	4,515	86.89%	0	0.00%
1944	619	12.36%	3,588	71.63%	802	16.01%
1948	946	16.93%	2,504	44.81%	2,138	38.26%
1952	4,708	51.01%	4,516	48.93%	5	0.05%
1956	5,048	64.76%	2,668	34.23%	79	1.01%
1960	4,613	46.39%	5,108	51.36%	224	2.25%
1964	5,568	46.67%	6,351	53.24%	11	0.09%
1968	3,668	26.29%	4,959	35.55%	5,324	38.16%
1972	9,600	68.28%	4,333	30.82%	127	0.90%
1976	7,787	49.79%	7,796	49.85%	56	0.36%
1980	9,328	53.32%	7,746	44.28%	419	2.40%
1984	12,618	61.52%	7,773	37.90%	118	0.58%
1988	11,957	56.18%	8,974	42.16%	354	1.66%
1992	8,733	38.50%	9,538	42.05%	4,412	19.45%
1996	9,835	45.42%	10,307	47.60%	1,513	6.99%
2000	13,834	60.23%	8,878	38.65%	258	1.12%
2004	16,473	62.82%	9,642	36.77%	108	0.41%
2008	17,103	65.38%	8,887	33.97%	168	0.64%
2012	17,512	66.92%	8,456	32.31%	202	0.77%
2016	18,749	70.62%	7,151	26.94%	648	2.44%
2020	21,466	72.23%	7,908	26.61%	343	1.15%
2024	22,658	74.92%	7,369	24.37%	216	0.71%

United States Senate election results for Harrison County, Texas1
Year	Republican		Democratic		Third party(ies)	
Year	No.	%	No.	%	No.	%
2024	22,137	73.60%	7,408	24.63%	534	1.78%

United States Senate election results for Harrison County, Texas2
Year	Republican		Democratic		Third party(ies)	
Year	No.	%	No.	%	No.	%
2020	21,231	72.25%	7,612	25.90%	542	1.84%

Texas Gubernatorial election results for Harrison County
Year	Republican		Democratic		Third party(ies)	
Year	No.	%	No.	%	No.	%
2022	16,472	77.13%	4,688	21.95%	196	0.92%

== See also ==
- List of museums in East Texas
- National Register of Historic Places listings in Harrison County, Texas
- Recorded Texas Historic Landmarks in Harrison County
